= 2017 FIBA 3x3 Europe Cup qualification =

Tournament information
- Dates: June 23–25
- Host(s): (Andorra) Escaldes-Engordany (France) Poitiers

The qualification of the 2017 FIBA 3x3 Europe Cup took place in June 2017. Twenty-four teams from 16 countries took part in these tournaments, with 12 teams of each gender qualifying for the final championship.

== Participating teams ==
=== Men ===
France Qualifier

- Slovakia
- Serbia
- Switzerland
- Turkey
- Hungary
- Denmark
- France
- Romania
- Croatia
- Netherlands
- Italy
- Belgium

Andorra Qualifier

- Slovenia
- Poland
- Russia
- Ukraine
- Andorra
- Germany
- Czech Republic
- Spain
- Georgia
- Latvia
- Israel
- Ireland

=== Women ===
France Qualifier

- Spain
- France
- Israel
- Ireland
- Russia
- Serbia
- Latvia
- Austria
- Poland
- Ukraine
- Czech Republic
- Belgium

Andorra Qualifier

- Hungary
- Italy
- Switzerland
- Germany
- Andorra
- Slovakia
- Romania
- Estonia
- Turkey

== Men's qualification ==
=== France Qualifier ===
==== Pool play ====
Pool A

Pos	Team	Pld	W	L	PF	PA	PD	PCT	Qualification	(Serbia)	(Turkey)	(Slovakia)
1	Serbia	2	2	0	40	22	+18	1.000	Advance to quarterfinals	—	21–9	19–13
2	Turkey	2	1	1	24	32	−8	.500	Advance to quarterfinals	—	—	15–11
3	Slovakia	2	0	2	24	34	−10	.000		—	—	—

Source: FIBA
Rules for classification: 1) Winning percentage; 2) Head-to-head; 3) Points scored.

Pool B

Pos	Team	Pld	W	L	PF	PA	PD	PCT	Qualification	(Netherlands)	(Hungary)	(Croatia)
1	Netherlands	2	1	1	35	35	0	.500	Advance to quarterfinals	—	18–16	17–19
2	Hungary	2	1	1	33	32	+1	.500	Advance to quarterfinals	—	—	17–14
3	Croatia	2	1	1	33	34	−1	.500		—	—	—

Source: FIBA
Rules for classification: 1) Winning percentage; 2) Head-to-head; 3) Points scored.

Pool C

Pos	Team	Pld	W	L	PF	PA	PD	PCT	Qualification	(Switzerland)	(Romania)	(Belgium)
1	Switzerland	2	2	0	38	23	+15	1.000	Advance to quarterfinals	—	16–14	22–9
2	Romania	2	1	1	27	28	−1	.500	Advance to quarterfinals	—	—	13–12
3	Belgium	2	0	2	21	35	−14	.000		—	—	—

Source: FIBA
Rules for classification: 1) Winning percentage; 2) Head-to-head; 3) Points scored.

Pool D

Pos	Team	Pld	W	L	PF	PA	PD	PCT	Qualification	(France)	(Italy)	(Denmark)
1	France (H)	2	2	0	43	23	+20	1.000	Advance to quarterfinals	—	22–13	21–10
2	Italy	2	1	1	30	30	0	.500	Advance to quarterfinals	—	—	13–12
3	Denmark	2	0	2	18	38	−20	.000		—	—	—

Source: FIBA
Rules for classification: 1) Winning percentage; 2) Head-to-head; 3) Points scored.
(H) Hosts

==== Knockout stage ====
Quarterfinals
25 Jun
Serbia	21
Italy	11
25 Jun
Switzerland	17
Hungary	21
25 Jun
Netherlands	21
Romania	20
25 Jun
France	21
Turkey	9

Semifinals
25 Jun
Serbia	21
Hungary	18
25 Jun
Netherlands	14
France	18

Final
25 Jun
Serbia	21
France	11

==== Final standings ====
Qualified for the 2017 FIBA 3x3 Europe Cup
Qualified to 2017 FIBA 3x3 Europe Cup as host

Pos	Team	Pld	W	L	PF
1	Serbia	5	5	0	104
2	France (H)	5	4	1	93
3	Hungary	4	2	2	72
4	Netherlands	4	2	2	70
5	Switzerland	4	3	1	76
6	Turkey	4	2	2	54
7	Romania	4	1	3	55
8	Italy	4	1	3	50
9	Croatia	2	1	1	33
10	Slovakia	2	0	2	24
11	Belgium	2	0	2	21
12	Denmark	2	0	2	18

=== Andorra Qualifier ===
==== Pool play ====
Pool A

Pos	Team	Pld	W	L	PF	PA	PD	PCT	Qualification	(Spain)	(Slovenia)	(Georgia (country))
1	Spain	2	2	0	37	21	+16	1.000	Advance to quarterfinals	—	16–13	21–8
2	Slovenia	2	1	1	34	30	+4	.500	Advance to quarterfinals	—	—	21–14
3	Georgia	2	0	2	22	42	−20	.000		—	—	—

Source: FIBA
Rules for classification: 1) Winning percentage; 2) Head-to-head; 3) Points scored.

Pool B

Pos	Team	Pld	W	L	PF	PA	PD	PCT	Qualification	(Latvia)	(Czech Republic)	(Poland)
1	Latvia	2	2	0	35	32	+3	1.000	Advance to quarterfinals	—	17–15	18–17
2	Czech Republic	2	1	1	35	32	+3	.500	Advance to quarterfinals	—	—	20–15
3	Poland	2	0	2	32	38	−6	.000		—	—	—

Source: FIBA
Rules for classification: 1) Winning percentage; 2) Head-to-head; 3) Points scored.

Pool C

Pos	Team	Pld	W	L	PF	PA	PD	PCT	Qualification	(Russia)	(Germany)	(Israel)
1	Russia	2	2	0	36	23	+13	1.000	Advance to quarterfinals	—	17–9	19–14
2	Germany	2	1	1	25	32	−7	.500	Advance to quarterfinals	—	—	16–15
3	Israel	2	0	2	29	35	−6	.000		—	—	—

Source: FIBA
Rules for classification: 1) Winning percentage; 2) Head-to-head; 3) Points scored.

Pool D

Pos	Team	Pld	W	L	PF	PA	PD	PCT	Qualification	(Ukraine)	(Andorra)	(Republic of Ireland)
1	Ukraine	2	2	0	42	21	+21	1.000	Advance to quarterfinals	—	21–14	21–7
2	Andorra (H)	2	1	1	35	41	−6	.500	Advance to quarterfinals	—	—	21–20
3	Ireland	2	0	2	27	42	−15	.000		—	—	—

Source: FIBA
Rules for classification: 1) Winning percentage; 2) Head-to-head; 3) Points scored.
(H) Hosts

==== Knockout stage ====
Quarterfinals
25 Jun
Spain	21
Andorra	9
25 Jun
Russia	20
Czech Republic	18
25 Jun
Latvia	21
Germany	13
25 Jun
Ukraine	19
Slovenia	14

Semifinals
25 Jun
Spain	20
Russia	22
25 Jun
Latvia	21
Ukraine	12

Final
25 Jun
Russia	14
Latvia	21

==== Final standings ====
Qualified for the 2017 FIBA 3x3 Europe Cup

Pos	Team	Pld	W	L	PF
1	Latvia	5	5	0	98
2	Russia	5	4	1	92
3	Spain	4	3	1	78
4	Ukraine	4	3	1	73
5	Czech Republic	4	2	2	75
6	Slovenia	4	2	2	66
7	Andorra (H)	4	1	3	55
8	Germany	4	1	3	54
9	Poland	2	0	2	32
10	Israel	2	0	2	29
11	Ireland	2	0	2	27
12	Georgia	2	0	2	22

== Women's qualification ==
=== Andorra Qualifier ===
==== Knockout stage ====
Quarterfinals
25 Jun
Hungary	19
Slovakia	14
25 Jun
Italy	20
Germany	4
25 Jun
Estonia	10
Romania	16
25 Jun
Switzerland	21
Turkey	10

Semifinals
25 Jun
Hungary	17
Italy	12
25 Jun
Romania	14
Switzerland	14

Final
25 Jun
Hungary	16
Switzerland	14

Classification 5-8
25 Jun
Slovakia	18
Germany	10
25 Jun
Estonia	19
Turkey	7

Classification 5-6
25 Jun
Slovakia	17
Estonia	13

==== Final standings ====
Qualified for the 2017 FIBA 3x3 Europe Cup

Pos	Team	Pld	W	L	PF
1	Hungary	7	7	0	123
2	Switzerland	6	5	1	103
3	Italy	5	3	2	78
4	Romania	5	2	3	64
5	Slovakia	6	2	4	70
6	Estonia	7	4	3	102
7	Germany	6	2	4	59
8	Turkey	6	1	5	57
9	Andorra (H)	4	0	4	30
