= 2017 FIBA 3x3 Europe Cup =

Tournament information
- Location: Museumplein, Amsterdam
- Dates: 7–9 July
- Host: Netherlands
- Teams: 24

The 2017 FIBA 3x3 Europe Cup was the third edition of the 3x3 Europe Championships, organized by FIBA Europe, and was held between 7 and 9 July 2017, at the Museumplein in Amsterdam, the Netherlands. This 3x3 basketball competition featured separate tournaments for men's and women's national teams.

Latvia won their first European championship title in the men's tournament, by beating Slovenia in the final. In the women's tournament, Russia won their second European championship title by beating Spain in the final.

== Qualification ==
The qualification events took place in June 2017. Twenty-four teams from 16 countries took part in these tournaments, with 12 teams of each gender qualifying for the final championship.

=== Men ===
Event	Date	Location	Berths	Qualified
Host nation	13 February	(Switzerland) Geneva	1	Netherlands
France Qualifier	23–24 June	(France) Poitiers	5	Serbia; France; Hungary; Switzerland; Turkey
Andorra Qualifier	24–25 June	(Andorra) Escaldes-Engordany	6	Latvia; Russia; Spain; Ukraine; Czech Republic; Slovenia
TOTAL			12	

=== Women ===
Event	Date	Location	Berths	Qualified
Host nation	13 February	(Switzerland) Geneva	1	Netherlands
France Qualifier	23–24 June	(France) Poitiers	6	Russia; Spain; Czech Republic; Ireland; France; Serbia
Andorra Qualifier	24–25 June	(Andorra) Escaldes-Engordany	5	Hungary; Switzerland; Italy; Romania; Slovakia
TOTAL			12	

== Participating teams ==
The FIBA 3x3 Federation Ranking was used as basis to determine the participating FIBA member associations. Pools were announced on 26 June 2017.

=== Men ===
Group A

- Serbia
- Hungary
- Spain

Group B

- Slovenia
- Latvia
- Czech Republic

Group C

- Russia
- France
- Switzerland

Group D

- Netherlands
- Ukraine
- Turkey

=== Women ===
Group A

- Hungary
- Switzerland
- Romania

Group B

- Russia
- Spain
- Slovakia

Group C

- Czech Republic
- Italy
- Serbia

Group D

- France
- Netherlands
- Ireland

== Medalists ==
Event	Gold	Silver	Bronze
Men's team Details	Latvia; Agnis Čavars; Edgars Krūmiņš; Kārlis Lasmanis; Nauris Miezis	Slovenia; Simon Finžgar; Adin Kavgić; Gašper Ovnik; Anže Srebovt	Ukraine; Sasha Kobets; Dmytro Lypovtsev; Stanislav Tymofeyenko; Maksym Zakurdaiev
Women's team Details	Russia; Anna Leshkovtseva; Anastasia Logunova; Tatiana Petrushina; Aleksandra Stolyar	Spain; Aitana Cuevas; Cristina Hurtado; Paula Palomares; Irene San Román	Netherlands; Sharon Beld; Loyce Bettonvil; Jacobine Klerx; Karin Kuijt

== See also ==
- 2017 FIBA 3x3 Under-18 Europe Cup
- 2017 FIBA 3x3 World Cup
