= Bulgaria men's national 3x3 team =

National 3x3 basketball team

Bulgaria
- Joined FIBA: 1935
- FIBA zone: FIBA Europe
- National federation: Bulgarian Basketball Federation

FIBA 3x3 World Championships
- Appearances: 1

FIBA Europe 3x3 Championships
- Appearances: 0

European Games
- Appearances: 0

The Bulgaria men's national 3x3 team is the 3x3 basketball team representing Bulgaria in international competitions, organized and run by the Bulgarian Basketball Federation.

== Senior Competitions ==
=== Performance at World Championships ===
Year	Pos	Pld	W	L
(Greece) 2012	16th	6	2	4
(Russia) 2014	Did not enter			
(China) 2016	Did not enter			
(France) 2017	Did not enter			
(Philippines) 2018	Did not enter			
(Netherlands) 2019	Did not enter			
(Belgium) 2022	Did not enter			
(Austria) 2023	Did not enter			
(Mongolia) 2025	Did not enter			

=== Performance at European Games ===
Year	Pos	Pld	W	L
(Azerbaijan) 2015	Did not qualify			
(Belarus) 2019	Did not qualify			
(Poland) 2023	Did not qualify			

=== Performance at Europe Championships ===
Year	Final tournament				Qualifier		
Year	Pos	Pld	W	L	Pld	W	L
(Romania) 2014	Did not enter				Did not enter		
(Romania) 2016	Did not enter				Did not enter		
(Netherlands) 2017	Did not enter				Did not enter		
(Romania) 2018	Did not enter				Did not enter		
(Hungary) 2019	Did not enter				Did not enter		
(France) 2021	Did not enter				Did not enter		
(Austria) 2022	Did not enter				Did not enter		
(Israel) 2023	Did not enter				Did not enter		
(Austria) 2024	Did not enter				4	2	2
(Denmark) 2025	Did not enter				Did not enter		

== Youth Competitions ==
=== Performance at Under-18 World Championships ===
Year	Pos	Pld	W	L
(Italy) 2011	2nd	?	?	?
(Spain) 2012	9th	?	?	?
(Indonesia) 2013	15th	?	?	?
(Hungary) 2015	Did not enter			
(Kazakhstan) 2016	Did not enter			
(China) 2017	Did not enter			
(Mongolia) 2019	Did not enter			
(Hungary) 2021	Did not enter			
(Hungary) 2022	Did not enter			
(Hungary) 2023	Did not enter			
(Hungary) 2024	Did not enter			

=== Performance at Under-18 European Championships ===
Year	Final tournament				Qualifier		
Year	Pos	Pld	W	L	Pld	W	L
(Belarus) 2015	Did not enter				Did not enter		
(Hungary) 2016	Did not enter				Did not enter		

== See also ==
- Bulgaria women's national 3x3 team
