= Basketball at the 2020 Summer Olympics – Women's 3x3 qualification =

In the 2020 Summer Olympics, eight teams qualified for the Olympic 3x3 women's basketball tournament. The 2020 Summer Olympics were postponed to 2021 due to the COVID-19 pandemic.

== Format ==
Four teams qualified based on the 1 November 2019 world ranking list. Japan, as the host nation, was guaranteed one quota spot between the men's and women's tournaments. If Japan would have not ranked within the top four NOCs in either men's or women's on the ranking list, Japan's higher-ranked team between the two genders (if evenly ranked, Japan's women's team) qualified and only the top three teams in the rankings for that gender qualified. No more than two NOCs from any given continent may qualify through the ranking list.

Three teams qualified through the 2020 FIBA Olympic Qualifying Tournament (OQT). This was a 20-team tournament. NOCs already qualified through the ranking list will not be eligible to play in the OQT. The 20 teams for the OQT consisted of the OQT hosts, the three highest-placed teams at the 2019 FIBA 3x3 World Cup, and 16 teams on the world ranking list (with Japan being guaranteed a spot if not already qualified for the Olympics). The first ten quota spots for the OQT are open to any team that has not qualified for the women's Olympic tournament, but the remaining ten spots are subject to two restrictions. First, an NOC that has a team qualified for the men's tournament was excluded from these restricted quota places. Second, no more than ten NOCs from any given continent may compete at the OQT.

The final quota place was determined through the 2020 FIBA Universality Olympic Qualifying Tournament (UOQT). This was a 6-team tournament. NOCs already qualified through the ranking list or the OQT were not eligible to play in the UOQT. Further, any NOC that has had a men's or women's team play in the basketball at the 2012 Summer Olympics or basketball at the 2016 Summer Olympics tournaments was ineligible for the UOQT. The six teams for the UOQT consisted of the UOQT hosts and five teams on the world ranking list (with Japan being guaranteed a spot if not already qualified for the Olympics; Japan was eligible for the UOQT despite having a women's team play basketball in the 2016 Summer Olympics).

== Table ==
Means of qualification	Date(s)	Location	Berth(s)	Qualifier(s)
Host nation	—	—	0	—
FIBA 3x3 World Ranking	1 November 2019	(Japan) Utsunomiya	4	ROC; China; Mongolia; Romania
2021 FIBA 3x3 Women's Olympic Qualifying Tournament	26–30 May 2021	(Austria) Graz	3	United States; France; Japan
2020 FIBA Universality Olympic Qualifying Tournament	4–6 June 2021	(Hungary) Debrecen	1	Italy
Total			8	

== World ranking ==
The top four teams (three if Japan uses the host quota place in the women's tournament) on the FIBA 3x3 women's basketball ranking list on 1 November 2019 qualified for the Olympics. These rankings were also used to determine entrants to both the OQT and UOQT.

== OQT ==
Teams already qualified for the Olympics are excluded. The hosts of the OQT, the top three teams from the World Cup, and 16 teams from the rankings (including Japan, if not already qualified) competed for three Olympic qualifying places. It was initially scheduled to be held from 18 to 22 March 2020. but was postponed due to the COVID-19 pandemic. The tournament was initially scheduled to be held in Bangalore, India but the tournament was moved to Graz, Austria and was held from 26 to 30 May 2021.

=== Qualified teams ===
Means of qualification	Date	Venue	Berth(s)	Qualifier(s)
OQT hosts	—	—	1	Austria
2019 FIBA 3x3 World Cup	23 June 2019	(Netherlands) Amsterdam	2	Hungary; France
FIBA 3x3 World Ranking	1 November 2019	(Japan) Utsunomiya	17	United States; Germany; Uruguay; Indonesia; Iran; Japan; Thailand; Australia; Netherlands; Estonia; Belarus; Sri Lanka; Italy; Chinese Taipei; Spain; Switzerland; Ukraine
Total			20	

=== Final standings ===
#	Team	Pld	W	L	PF	PA	PD
1st	United States	6	6	0	127	64	+63
2nd	France	6	5	1	109	79	+30
3rd	Japan	7	6	1	138	88	+40
4th	Spain	7	4	3	123	112	+11
Eliminated at the quarterfinals
5th	Hungary	5	4	1	98	61	+37
6th	Australia	5	3	2	86	54	+32
7th	Switzerland	5	3	2	84	70	+14
8th	Belarus	5	2	3	78	75	+3
Eliminated at the preliminary round
9th	Austria	4	3	1	69	66	+3
10th	Germany	4	2	2	67	63	+4
11th	Ukraine	4	2	2	67	49	+18
12th	Netherlands	4	2	2	65	54	+11
13th	Estonia	4	2	2	65	62	+3
14th	Italy	4	1	3	69	77	−8
15th	Indonesia	4	1	3	44	76	−32
16th	Thailand	4	1	3	39	84	−45
17th	Chinese Taipei	4	0	4	50	85	−35
18th	Uruguay	4	0	4	41	85	−44
19th	Iran	4	0	4	33	82	−49
20th	Sri Lanka	4	0	4	22	88	−66

Qualified for the 2020 Summer Olympics

== UOQT ==
Teams already qualified for the Olympics were excluded. NOCs which have had teams in either the men's or women's competitions at the 2012 or 2016 Olympics were also excluded, except for Japan. The hosts of the UOQT and five teams from the rankings (including Japan, if not already qualified) competed for one Olympic qualifying place.

=== Qualified teams ===
Means of qualification	Date	Venue	Berth(s)	Qualifier(s)
UOQT hosts	—	—	1	Hungary
FIBA 3x3 World Ranking	1 November 2019	—	5	Iran; Netherlands; Italy; Chinese Taipei; Estonia
Total			6	

=== Preliminary round ===
==== Pool A ====
Pos	Team	Pld	W	L	PF	PA	PD	Qualification	Italy	Chinese Taipei for Olympic games	Iran
1	Italy	2	2	0	42	16	+26	Semifinals		21–11	21–5
2	Chinese Taipei	2	1	1	27	31	−4	Quarterfinals			
3	Iran	2	0	2	15	37	−22	Quarterfinals		10–16	

Source: FIBA
Rules for classification: 1) Wins; 2) Head-to-head record; 3) Points scored; 4) Higher seed.

==== Pool B ====
Pos	Team	Pld	W	L	PF	PA	PD	Qualification	Hungary	Netherlands	Estonia
1	Hungary (H)	2	2	0	27	22	+5	Semifinals			13–10
2	Netherlands	2	1	1	23	24	−1	Quarterfinals	12–14		11–10
3	Estonia	2	0	2	20	24	−4	Quarterfinals			

Source: FIBA
Rules for classification: 1) Wins; 2) Head-to-head record; 3) Points scored; 4) Higher seed.
(H) Hosts

=== Knockout stage ===
Quarter-finals
6 June
Netherlands	20
Iran	10
6 June
Chinese Taipei	21
Estonia	17

Semi-finals
6 June
Italy	16
Netherlands	11
6 June
Hungary	21
Chinese Taipei	9

Final
6 June
Italy	13
Hungary	12

== See also ==
- Basketball at the 2020 Summer Olympics – Men's 3x3 qualification
