= 2016 FIBA Europe 3x3 Championships =

Tournament information
- Location: Bucharest
- Dates: 2–4 September 2016
- Host: Romania

The 2016 FIBA Europe 3x3 Championships was the second edition of the European 3x3 basketball event that featured separate competitions for men's and women's national teams. The tournament started on 25 June 2016 with the first of the three qualifying tournaments and its final tournament was played in the AFI Cotroceni shopping mall in Bucharest, Romania between 2 and 4 September 2016.

In the men's tournament, Slovenia won their first European championship title by beating Serbia in the final. Hungary also won their first European championship title in the women's tournament, by beating Romania in the final.

== Qualification ==
The qualification events took place in the Summer of 2016. A total of 26 teams took part in these tournaments, with 12 teams of each gender qualifying for the final championship.

=== Men ===
==== Qualifier 1 ====
The first qualifying tournament took place in Escaldes-Engordany, Andorra from 25 to 26 June 2016. The four best teams qualified for the European Championship.

Group A

Pos	Team	Pld	W	L	PF	PA	PD	PCT	Qualification	(Spain)	(Slovenia)	(Republic of Ireland)	(Latvia)	(Georgia (country))
1	Spain	4	4	0	82	40	+42	1.000	Qualification to quarterfinals	—	19–16		21–6	
2	Slovenia	4	3	1	79	59	+20	.750	Qualification to quarterfinals		—		21–8	21–19
3	Ireland	4	2	2	63	70	−7	.500	Qualification to quarterfinals	13–21	13–21	—		
4	Latvia	4	1	3	42	73	−31	.250	Qualification to quarterfinals			11–16	—	17–15
5	Georgia	4	0	4	56	80	−24	.000		5–21		17–21		—

Source: FIBA
Rules for classification: 1) Winning percentage; 2) Head-to-head; 3) Points scored.

Group B

Pos	Team	Pld	W	L	PF	PA	PD	PCT	Qualification	(Czech Republic)	(Ukraine)	(Andorra)	(Belarus)
1	Czech Republic	3	2	1	51	52	−1	.667	Qualification to quarterfinals	—	21–19		9–21
2	Ukraine	3	2	1	55	44	+11	.667	Qualification to quarterfinals		—		21–15
3	Andorra (H)	3	1	2	40	51	−11	.333	Qualification to quarterfinals	12–21	8–15	—	
4	Belarus	3	1	2	51	50	+1	.333	Qualification to quarterfinals			15–20	—

Source: FIBA
Rules for classification: 1) Winning percentage; 2) Head-to-head; 3) Points scored.
(H) Hosts

Bracket

Quarterfinals
Spain	19
Belarus	14
Ukraine	19
Ireland	10
Slovenia	19
Andorra	18
Czech Republic	21
Latvia	19

Semifinals
Spain	21
Ukraine	18
Slovenia	21
Czech Republic	17

Final
Spain	19
Slovenia	22

- The four quarterfinal winners (Czech Republic, Slovenia, Spain, and Ukraine) qualified for the European Championship.

==== Qualifier 2 ====
The second qualifying tournament took place in Amsterdam, Netherlands on 1 and 2 July 2016. The four best teams qualified for the European Championship.

Group A

Pos	Team	Pld	W	L	PF	PA	PD	PCT	Qualification	(Serbia)	(Azerbaijan)	(Turkey)	(Germany)
1	Serbia	3	3	0	63	32	+31	1.000	Qualification to quarterfinals	—	21–12	21–13	
2	Azerbaijan	3	2	1	54	47	+7	.667	Qualification to quarterfinals		—		21–10
3	Turkey	3	1	2	46	57	−11	.333	Qualification to quarterfinals		16–21	—	17–15
4	Germany	3	0	3	32	59	−27	.000	Qualification to quarterfinals	7–21			—

Source: FIBA
Rules for classification: 1) Winning percentage; 2) Head-to-head; 3) Points scored.

Group B

Pos	Team	Pld	W	L	PF	PA	PD	PCT	Qualification	(Netherlands)	(Russia)	(Slovakia)	(Switzerland)
1	Netherlands (H)	3	2	1	61	43	+18	.667	Qualification to quarterfinals	—	21–19	22–5	
2	Russia	3	2	1	56	51	+5	.667	Qualification to quarterfinals		—	18–14	19–16
3	Slovakia	3	1	2	34	52	−18	.333	Qualification to quarterfinals			—	15–12
4	Switzerland	3	1	2	47	52	−5	.333	Qualification to quarterfinals	19–18			—

Source: FIBA
Rules for classification: 1) Winning percentage; 2) Head-to-head; 3) Points scored.
(H) Hosts

Bracket

Quarterfinals
Serbia	17
Switzerland	13
Russia	21
Turkey	19
Azerbaijan	15
Slovakia	16
Netherlands	16
Germany	7

Semifinals
Serbia	20
Russia	11
Slovakia	16
Netherlands	17

Finals
Serbia	22
Netherlands	7

- The four quarterfinal winners (Netherlands, Russia, Serbia, and Slovakia) qualified for the European Championship.

==== Qualifier 3 ====
The third qualifying tournament took place in Poitiers, France on 1 and 2 July 2016. The three best teams, and hosts Romania, qualified for the European Championship.

Group A

Pos	Team	Pld	W	L	PF	PA	PD	PCT	Qualification	(France)	(Poland)	(Estonia)	(Israel)
1	France (H)	3	3	0	64	46	+18	1.000	Qualification to semifinals	—		22–18	21–9
2	Poland	3	2	1	56	50	+6	.667	Qualification to semifinals	19–21	—		21–15
3	Estonia	3	1	2	52	56	−4	.333			14–16	—	
4	Israel	3	0	3	42	62	−20	.000				18–20	—

Source: FIBA
Rules for classification: 1) Winning percentage; 2) Head-to-head; 3) Points scored.
(H) Hosts

Group B

Pos	Team	Pld	W	L	PF	PA	PD	PCT	Qualification	(Italy)	(Romania)	(Belgium)	(Hungary)
1	Italy	3	3	0	56	45	+11	1.000	Qualification to semifinals	—		18–16	16–14
2	Romania	3	2	1	55	47	+8	.667	Qualification to semifinals	15–22	—	19–16	
3	Belgium	3	1	2	50	54	−4	.333				—	18–17
4	Hungary	3	0	3	40	55	−15	.000			9–21		—

Source: FIBA
Rules for classification: 1) Winning percentage; 2) Head-to-head; 3) Points scored.

Bracket

Semifinals
France	21
Romania	10
Italy	18
Poland	15

Final
France	21
Italy	11
Third place
Romania	15
Poland	12

- Hosts Romania and the two semifinal winners (France and Italy), plus fourth-placed Poland, qualified for the European Championship.

=== Women ===
==== Qualifier 1 ====
The first qualifying tournament took place in Escaldes-Engordany, Andorra from 25 to 26 June 2016. The four best teams, and hosts Romania, qualified for the European Championship.

Group A

Pos	Team	Pld	W	L	PF	PA	PD	PCT	Qualification	(Hungary)	(Romania)	(Austria)	(Republic of Ireland)	(Poland)
1	Hungary	4	3	1	66	51	+15	.750	Qualification to quarterfinals	—	18–17		15–12	
2	Romania	4	3	1	64	47	+17	.750	Qualification to quarterfinals		—	15–11		15–6
3	Austria	4	3	1	55	50	+5	.750	Qualification to quarterfinals	14–12		—		13–11
4	Ireland	4	1	3	53	71	−18	.250	Qualification to quarterfinals		12–17	12–17	—	
5	Poland	4	0	4	37	66	−29	.000		8–21			12–17	—

Source: FIBA
Rules for classification: 1) Winning percentage; 2) Head-to-head; 3) Points scored.

Group B

Pos	Team	Pld	W	L	PF	PA	PD	PCT	Qualification	(Switzerland)	(Slovenia)	(Belarus)	(Andorra)
1	Switzerland	3	3	0	54	30	+24	1.000	Qualification to quarterfinals	—	16–12	21–10	
2	Slovenia	3	2	1	44	31	+13	.667	Qualification to quarterfinals		—	21–8	
3	Belarus	3	1	2	32	52	−20	.333	Qualification to quarterfinals			—	14–10
4	Andorra (H)	3	0	3	25	42	−17	.000	Qualification to quarterfinals	8–17	7–11		—

Source: FIBA
Rules for classification: 1) Winning percentage; 2) Head-to-head; 3) Points scored.
(H) Hosts

Bracket

Quarterfinals
Hungary	15
Andorra	6
Slovenia	12
Austria	10
Romania	21
Belarus	17
Switzerland	17
Ireland	13

Semifinals
Hungary	17
Slovenia	15
Romania	20
Switzerland	18

Final
Hungary	17
Romania	10

- Hosts Romania and the three other quarterfinal winners (Hungary, Slovenia, & Switzerland), as well as fifth-placed Austria, qualified for the European Championship.

==== Qualifier 2 ====
The second qualifying tournament took place in Amsterdam, Netherlands on 1 and 2 July 2016. The four best teams qualified for the European Championship.

Group A

Pos	Team	Pld	W	L	PF	PA	PD	PCT	Qualification	(Serbia)	(Belgium)	(Israel)	(Netherlands)
1	Serbia	3	3	0	60	26	+34	1.000	Qualification to quarterfinals	—		17–4	
2	Belgium	3	2	1	36	41	−5	.667	Qualification to quarterfinals	8–21	—	16–11	
3	Israel	3	1	2	26	43	−17	.333	Qualification to quarterfinals			—	11–10
4	Netherlands (H)	3	0	3	33	45	−12	.000	Qualification to quarterfinals	14–22	9–12		—

Source: FIBA
Rules for classification: 1) Winning percentage; 2) Head-to-head; 3) Points scored.
(H) Hosts

Group B

Pos	Team	Pld	W	L	PF	PA	PD	PCT	Qualification	(Czech Republic)	(Ukraine)	(Estonia)	(Germany)
1	Czech Republic	3	3	0	54	34	+20	1.000	Qualification to quarterfinals	—	16–14		20–9
2	Ukraine	3	2	1	54	35	+19	.667	Qualification to quarterfinals		—	21–8	
3	Estonia	3	1	2	30	47	−17	.333	Qualification to quarterfinals	11–18		—	
4	Germany	3	0	3	28	50	−22	.000	Qualification to quarterfinals		11–19	8–11	—

Source: FIBA
Rules for classification: 1) Winning percentage; 2) Head-to-head; 3) Points scored.

Bracket

Quarterfinals
Serbia	14
Germany	5
Ukraine	16
Israel	7
Belgium	10
Estonia	9
Czech Republic	17
Netherlands	10

Semifinals
Serbia	13
Ukraine	20
Belgium	12
Czech Republic	20

Finals
Ukraine	15
Czech Republic	17

- The four quarterfinal winners (Belgium, Czech Republic, Serbia, and Ukraine) qualified for the European Championship.

==== Qualifier 3 ====
The third qualifying tournament took place in Poitiers, France on 1 and 2 July 2016. The three best teams qualified for the European Championship.

Group A

Pos	Team	Pld	W	L	PF	PA	PD	PCT	Qualification	(Italy)	(Russia)	(Slovakia)	(Azerbaijan)
1	Italy	3	2	1	48	47	+1	.667	Qualification to semifinals	—	13–12		19–21
2	Russia	3	2	1	45	40	+5	.667	Qualification to semifinals		—	17–13	16–14
3	Slovakia	3	1	2	43	47	−4	.333		14–16		—	
4	Azerbaijan	3	1	2	49	51	−2	.333				14–16	—

Source: FIBA
Rules for classification: 1) Winning percentage; 2) Head-to-head; 3) Points scored.

Group B

Pos	Team	Pld	W	L	PF	PA	PD	PCT	Qualification	(France)	(Spain)	(Turkey)	(Latvia)
1	France (H)	2	2	0	27	19	+8	1.000	Qualification to semifinals	—	13–7		—
2	Spain	2	1	1	22	26	−4	.500	Qualification to semifinals		—	15–13	—
3	Turkey	2	0	2	25	29	−4	.000		12–14		—	
4	Latvia (X)	0	0	0	0	0	0	—				—	—

Source: FIBA
Rules for classification: 1) Winning percentage; 2) Head-to-head; 3) Points scored.
(H) Hosts; (X) Latvia were unable to attend and its games are not counted in the table

Bracket

Semifinals
Italy	13
Spain	12
France	14
Russia	16

Final
Italy	11
Russia	12
Third place
Spain	14
France	12

- The two semifinal winners (Italy and Russia), as well as third-placed Spain, qualified for the European Championship.

== Final tournament ==
The second edition of the FIBA 3x3 European Championships was held in Bucharest from 2-4 September 2016. A total of 12 teams of each gender qualified for the championship through one of three qualifying tournaments.

Pools were announced on 4 August 2016.

Slovenia in the men's tournament and Hungary in the women's tournament both won their first championship in this competition by beating Serbia and Romania in the final, respectively.

=== Qualified teams ===
Men's teams

- Romania (hosts)
- Czech Republic
- France
- Italy
- Netherlands
- Poland
- Russia
- Serbia
- Slovakia
- Slovenia
- Spain
- Ukraine

Women's teams

- Romania (hosts)
- Austria
- Belgium
- Czech Republic
- Hungary
- Italy
- Russia
- Serbia
- Slovenia
- Spain
- Switzerland
- Ukraine

=== Men's tournament ===
==== Pool play ====
Pool A

Pos	Team	Pld	W	L	PF	PA	PD	PCT	Qualification	(Serbia)	(Spain)	(France)
1	Serbia	2	2	0	39	28	+11	1.000	Advance to quarterfinals	—	21–15	18–13
2	Spain	2	1	1	28	32	−4	.500	Advance to quarterfinals	—	—	13–11
3	France	2	0	2	24	31	−7	.000		—	—	—

Source: FIBA
Rules for classification: 1) Winning percentage; 2) Head-to-head; 3) Points scored.

Pool B

Pos	Team	Pld	W	L	PF	PA	PD	PCT	Qualification	(Slovenia)	(Italy)	(Ukraine)
1	Slovenia	2	2	0	35	17	+18	1.000	Advance to quarterfinals	—	21–9	14–8
2	Italy	2	1	1	30	37	−7	.500	Advance to quarterfinals	—	—	21–16
3	Ukraine	2	0	2	24	35	−11	.000		—	—	—

Source: FIBA
Rules for classification: 1) Winning percentage; 2) Head-to-head; 3) Points scored.

Pool C

Pos	Team	Pld	W	L	PF	PA	PD	PCT	Qualification	(Netherlands)	(Poland)	(Czech Republic)
1	Netherlands	2	2	0	24	21	+3	1.000	Advance to quarterfinals	—	—	13–11
2	Poland	2	1	1	30	30	0	.500	Advance to quarterfinals	10–11	—	20–19
3	Czech Republic	2	0	2	30	33	−3	.000		—	—	—

Source: FIBA
Rules for classification: 1) Winning percentage; 2) Head-to-head; 3) Points scored.

Pool D

Pos	Team	Pld	W	L	PF	PA	PD	PCT	Qualification	(Russia)	(Romania)	(Slovakia)
1	Russia	2	2	0	41	29	+12	1.000	Advance to quarterfinals	—	20–19	21–10
2	Romania (H)	2	1	1	36	32	+4	.500	Advance to quarterfinals	—	—	17–12
3	Slovakia	2	0	2	22	38	−16	.000		—	—	—

Source: FIBA
Rules for classification: 1) Winning percentage; 2) Head-to-head; 3) Points scored.
(H) Hosts

==== Knockout stage ====
Quarterfinals
4 September
Serbia	22
Romania	11
4 September
Netherlands	20
Italy	18
4 September
Slovenia	21
Poland	14
4 September
Russia	21
Spain	20

Semifinals
4 September
Serbia	21
Netherlands	12
4 September
Slovenia	21
Russia	10

Final
4 September
Serbia	17
Slovenia	19
Third place
4 September
Netherlands	22
Russia	16

==== Final standings ====
Pos	Team	Pld	W	L	PF
1	Slovenia	5	5	0	96
2	Serbia	5	4	1	99
3	Netherlands	5	4	1	78
4	Russia	5	3	2	88
5	Italy	3	1	2	48
6	Spain	3	1	2	48
7	Romania	3	1	2	47
8	Poland	3	1	2	44
9	Czech Republic	2	0	2	30
10	France	2	0	2	24
11	Ukraine	2	0	2	24
12	Slovakia	2	0	2	22

=== Women's tournament ===
==== Pool play ====
Pool A

Pos	Team	Pld	W	L	PF	PA	PD	PCT	Qualification	(Hungary)	(Romania)	(Belgium)
1	Hungary	2	2	0	35	20	+15	1.000	Advance to quarterfinals	—	17–13	18–7
2	Romania (H)	2	1	1	31	33	−2	.500	Advance to quarterfinals	—	—	18–16
3	Belgium	2	0	2	23	36	−13	.000		—	—	—

Source: FIBA
Rules for classification: 1) Winning percentage; 2) Head-to-head; 3) Points scored.
(H) Hosts

Pool B

Pos	Team	Pld	W	L	PF	PA	PD	PCT	Qualification	(Ukraine)	(Serbia)	(Italy)
1	Ukraine	2	2	0	31	27	+4	1.000	Advance to quarterfinals	—	15–13	—
2	Serbia	2	1	1	31	31	0	.500	Advance to quarterfinals	—	—	—
3	Italy	2	0	2	30	34	−4	.000		14–16	16–18	—

Source: FIBA
Rules for classification: 1) Winning percentage; 2) Head-to-head; 3) Points scored.

Pool C

Pos	Team	Pld	W	L	PF	PA	PD	PCT	Qualification	(Russia)	(Switzerland)	(Slovenia)
1	Russia	2	2	0	24	19	+5	1.000	Advance to quarterfinals	—	—	14–11
2	Switzerland	2	1	1	22	23	−1	.500	Advance to quarterfinals	8–10	—	14–13
3	Slovenia	2	0	2	24	28	−4	.000		—	—	—

Source: FIBA
Rules for classification: 1) Winning percentage; 2) Head-to-head; 3) Points scored.

Pool D

Pos	Team	Pld	W	L	PF	PA	PD	PCT	Qualification	(Czech Republic)	(Spain)	(Austria)
1	Czech Republic	2	2	0	32	25	+7	1.000	Advance to quarterfinals	—	16–14	16–11
2	Spain	2	1	1	27	24	+3	.500	Advance to quarterfinals	—	—	13–8
3	Austria	2	0	2	19	29	−10	.000		—	—	—

Source: FIBA
Rules for classification: 1) Winning percentage; 2) Head-to-head; 3) Points scored.

==== Knockout stage ====
Quarterfinals
4 September
Hungary	19
Spain	16
4 September
Russia	19
Serbia	13
4 September
Ukraine	11
Switzerland	14
4 September
Czech Republic	16
Romania	18

Semifinals
4 September
Hungary	14
Russia	12
4 September
Switzerland	14
Romania	16

Final
4 September
Hungary	21
Romania	14
Third place
4 September
Russia	15
Switzerland	13

==== Final standings ====
Pos	Team	Pld	W	L	PF
1	Hungary	5	5	0	89
2	Romania	5	3	2	79
3	Russia	5	4	1	70
4	Switzerland	5	2	3	63
5	Czech Republic	3	2	1	48
6	Ukraine	3	2	1	42
7	Serbia	3	1	2	44
8	Spain	3	1	2	43
9	Italy	2	0	2	30
10	Slovenia	2	0	2	24
11	Belgium	2	0	2	23
12	Austria	2	0	2	19
