= 2017 FIBA 3x3 Europe Cup – Men's tournament =

2017 FIBA 3x3 Europe Cup Men's tournament
Tournament information
- Dates: July 7–9
- Host(s): (Netherlands) Amsterdam
- Venue(s): Museum Square
- Teams: 12

Final positions
- Champion: Latvia
- 1st runners-up: Slovenia
- 2nd runners-up: Ukraine

The Men's Tournament of the 2017 FIBA 3x3 Europe Cup took place at the Museumplein in Amsterdam, the Netherlands. Twelve teams participated in the men's tournament.

== Participating teams ==
Netherlands, as host country, and eleven more teams qualified to the final tournament through the two qualifiers played in Andorra and France.

Group A

- Serbia (1)
- Hungary (8)
- Spain (9)

Group B

- Slovenia (2)
- Latvia (7)
- Czech Republic (10)

Group C

- Russia (3)
- France (6)
- Switzerland (11)

Group D

- Netherlands (4)
- Ukraine (5)
- Turkey (12)

== Players ==
Team	Players (World Ranking as of July 7, 2017)	Ref.
Czech Republic	Ondřej Dygrýn (119), Jan Kratochvíl (189), Roman Zachrla (352), Filip Zbránek (420)	
France	Charles Bronchard (44), Dominique Gentil (59), Angelo Tsagarakis (81), Charly Pontens (225)	
Hungary	Tamás Ivosev (62), Nebojsa Dukic (361), Gábor Beák (379), Àkos Horvàth (567)	
Latvia	Edgars Krūmiņš (164), Kārlis Lasmanis (169), Nauris Miezis (185), Agnis Čavars (188)	
Netherlands	Jesper Jobse (29), Joey Schelvis (33), Sjoerd Van Vilsteren (38), Bas Rozendaal (51)	
Russia	Leo Lagutin (29), Ilya Alexandrov (67), Alexander Zakharov (212), Anton Indrikov (246)	
Serbia	Dušan Domović Bulut (1), Marko Savić (2), Dejan Majstorović (5), Danilo Mijatović (–)	
Slovenia	Anže Srebovt (11), Gašper Ovnik (12), Simon Finžgar (13), Adin Kavgić (14)	
Spain	José Rojas (43), Sergio de la Fuente (802), Christian Díaz (3846), Nacho Martín (–)	
Switzerland	Marco Lehmann (120), Westher Molteni (285), Gilles Martin (346), Natan Jurkovitz (2555)	
Turkey	Tanalp Şengün (499), Recai Öztürk (655), Mert Başdan (940), Türkay Barutçuoğlu (1100)	
Ukraine	Sasha Kobets (241), Maksym Zakurdaiev (265), Dmytro Lypovtsev (317), Stanislav Tymofeyenko (333)	

== Pool play ==
=== Pool A ===
Pos	Team	Pld	W	L	PF	PA	PD	PCT	Qualification	(Serbia)	(Spain)	(Hungary)
1	Serbia	2	2	0	42	22	+20	1.000	Advance to quarterfinals	—	21–9	21–13
2	Spain	2	1	1	27	36	−9	.500	Advance to quarterfinals	—	—	18–15
3	Hungary	2	0	2	28	39	−11	.000		—	—	—

Source: FIBA
Rules for classification: 1) Winning percentage; 2) Head-to-head; 3) Points scored.

=== Pool B ===
Pos	Team	Pld	W	L	PF	PA	PD	PCT	Qualification	(Slovenia)	(Latvia)	(Czech Republic)
1	Slovenia	2	2	0	34	24	+10	1.000	Advance to quarterfinals	—	13–11	21–13
2	Latvia	2	1	1	31	28	+3	.500	Advance to quarterfinals	—	—	20–15
3	Czech Republic	2	0	2	28	41	−13	.000		—	—	—

Source: FIBA
Rules for classification: 1) Winning percentage; 2) Head-to-head; 3) Points scored.

=== Pool C ===
Pos	Team	Pld	W	L	PF	PA	PD	PCT	Qualification	(France)	(Russia)	(Switzerland)
1	France	2	2	0	42	38	+4	1.000	Advance to quarterfinals	—	21–19	21–19
2	Russia	2	1	1	39	38	+1	.500	Advance to quarterfinals	—	—	20–17
3	Switzerland	2	0	2	36	41	−5	.000		—	—	—

Source: FIBA
Rules for classification: 1) Winning percentage; 2) Head-to-head; 3) Points scored.

=== Pool D ===
Pos	Team	Pld	W	L	PF	PA	PD	PCT	Qualification	(Ukraine)	(Netherlands)	(Turkey)
1	Ukraine	2	2	0	43	26	+17	1.000	Advance to quarterfinals	—	21–12	22–14
2	Netherlands (H)	2	1	1	33	38	−5	.500	Advance to quarterfinals	—	—	21–17
3	Turkey	2	0	2	31	43	−12	.000		—	—	—

Source: FIBA
Rules for classification: 1) Winning percentage; 2) Head-to-head; 3) Points scored.
(H) Hosts

== Knockout stage ==
Quarterfinals
9 July
Serbia	22
Netherlands	13
9 July
France	12
Latvia	17
9 July
Slovenia	17
Russia	13
9 July
Ukraine	19
Spain	17

Semifinals
9 July
Serbia	17
Latvia	19
9 July
Slovenia	22
Ukraine	8

Final
9 July
Latvia	16
Slovenia	13
Third place
9 July
Serbia	18
Ukraine	20

Source: FIBA

== Final standings ==
Pos	Team	Pld	W	L	PF
1	Latvia	5	4	1	67
2	Slovenia	5	4	1	73
3	Ukraine	5	4	1	90
4	Serbia	5	3	2	99
5	France	3	2	1	54
6	Russia	3	1	2	52
7	Netherlands	3	1	2	46
8	Spain	3	1	2	44
9	Switzerland	2	0	2	36
10	Turkey	2	0	2	31
11	Hungary	2	0	2	28
12	Czech Republic	2	0	2	28
