= 2017 FIBA 3x3 U18 World Cup – Men's tournament =

Basketball tournament in Chengdu, China

2017 FIBA 3x3 U18 World Cup Men's tournament
Tournament information
- Location: Chengdu, China
- Date: July 2–8
- Host: China
- Venue: New Century Global Center
- Teams: 20

Final positions
- Champion: Belgium
- 1st runners-up: Netherlands
- 2nd runners-up: Slovenia

The men's tournament of the 2017 FIBA 3x3 Under-18 World Cup was hosted in Chengdu, China, in front of the New Century Global Center. It was contested by 20 teams.

== Participating teams ==
The FIBA Zone of the Americas was not represented by at least one country in the continent. The top 20 teams, including the hosts, based on the FIBA National Federation ranking qualified for the tournament as of January 3, 2017.

FIBA Asia (8)

- Philippines (7)
- Bahrain (9)
- China (10)
- Indonesia (11)
- Qatar (14)
- Turkmenistan (15)
- Jordan (18)
- South Korea (19)

FIBA Africa (1)

- Uganda (20)

FIBA Oceania (1)

- New Zealand (6)

FIBA Europe (10)

- Netherlands (1)
- Ukraine (2)
- Hungary (3)
- Romania (4)
- Slovenia (5)
- Poland (8)
- Belgium (12)
- Turkey (13)
- Israel (16)
- Georgia (17)

== Main tournament ==
=== Preliminary round ===
==== Group A ====
Pos	Team	Pld	W	L	PF	PA	PD	Qualification	(Netherlands)	(Philippines)	(Israel)	(Poland)	(Turkmenistan)
1	Netherlands	4	4	0	73	49	+24	Qualification to knockout stage	—	13–10	21–16	21–11	18–12
2	Philippines	4	3	1	70	58	+12	Qualification to knockout stage	10–13	—	19–17	20–14	21–14
3	Israel	4	2	2	67	58	+9		16–21	17–19	—	17–11	17–7
4	Poland	4	1	3	57	74	−17		11–21	14–20	11–17	—	21–16
5	Turkmenistan	4	0	4	49	77	−28		12–18	14–21	7–17	16–21	—

Source: FIBA
Rules for classification: 1) Wins; 2) Head-to-Head record; 3) Points scored; 4) Higher seed.

==== Group B ====
Pos	Team	Pld	W	L	PF	PA	PD	Qualification	(Ukraine)	(New Zealand)	(Qatar)	(Georgia (country))	(Bahrain)
1	Ukraine	4	4	0	72	33	+39	Qualification to knockout stage	—	16–9	18–13	21–6	17–5
2	New Zealand	4	3	1	66	59	+7	Qualification to knockout stage	9–16	—	14–13	22–20	21–10
3	Qatar	4	1	3	60	63	−3		13–18	13–14	—	17–19	17–12
4	Georgia	4	1	3	58	77	−19		6–21	20–22	19–17	—	13–17
5	Bahrain	4	1	3	44	68	−24		5–17	10–21	12–17	17–13	—

Source: FIBA
Rules for classification: 1) Wins; 2) Head-to-Head record; 3) Points scored; 4) Higher seed.

==== Group C ====
Pos	Team	Pld	W	L	PF	PA	PD	Qualification	(Hungary)	(Slovenia)	(China)	(Turkey)	(South Korea)
1	Hungary	4	4	0	74	57	+17	Qualification to knockout stage	—	15–12	17–14	20–18	22–13
2	Slovenia	4	3	1	73	50	+23	Qualification to knockout stage	12–15	—	18–15	21–14	22–6
3	China	4	2	2	67	51	+16		14–17	15–18	—	21–6	17–10
4	Turkey	4	1	3	57	75	−18		18–20	14–21	6–21	—	19–13
5	South Korea	4	0	4	42	80	−38		13–22	6–22	10–17	13–19	—

Source: FIBA
Rules for classification: 1) Wins; 2) Head-to-Head record; 3) Points scored; 4) Higher seed.

==== Group D ====
Pos	Team	Pld	W	L	PF	PA	PD	Qualification	(Belgium)	(Romania)	(Uganda)	(Indonesia)	(Jordan)
1	Belgium	4	4	0	77	39	+38	Qualification to knockout stage	—	18–11	20–14	18–11	22–3
2	Romania	4	3	1	68	42	+26	Qualification to knockout stage	11–18	—	18–8	21–7	18–9
3	Uganda	4	2	2	57	63	−6		14–20	8–18	—	20–18	15–7
4	Indonesia	4	1	3	57	68	−11		11–18	7–21	18–20	—	21–9
5	Jordan	4	0	4	28	75	−47		3–21	9–18	7–15	9–21	—

Source: FIBA
Rules for classification: 1) Wins; 2) Head-to-Head record; 3) Points scored; 4) Higher seed.

=== Knockout stage ===
Quarter-finals
Netherlands	17
Romania	13
Hungary	15
New Zealand	16
Ukraine	18
Slovenia	20
Belgium	18
Philippines	14

Semi-finals
Netherlands	18
New Zealand	10
Slovenia	11
Belgium	13

Final
Netherlands	12
Belgium	17
Bronze Final
New Zealand	17
Slovenia	21

=== Final standings ===
Pos	Team	Pld	W	L	PF
1	Belgium	7	7	0	125
2	Netherlands	7	6	1	120
3	Slovenia	7	5	2	125
4	New Zealand	7	4	3	109
5	Ukraine	5	4	1	90
6	Hungary	5	4	1	89
7	Philippines	5	3	2	84
8	Romania	5	3	2	81
9	China	4	2	2	67
10	Israel	4	2	2	67
11	Uganda	4	2	2	57
12	Qatar	4	1	3	60
13	Georgia	4	1	3	58
14	Indonesia	4	1	3	57
15	Poland	4	1	3	57
16	Turkey	4	1	3	57
17	Bahrain	4	1	3	44
18	Turkmenistan	4	0	4	49
19	South Korea	4	0	4	42
20	Jordan	4	0	4	28

== Individual contests ==
=== Dunk contest ===
Overall format

Each player will be allowed 75 seconds and 3 attempts per round to complete a dunk with the first successful dunk being considered as the valid one. Dunks are graded 0 or 5 to 10 by each member of a jury composing of five people.

==== Qualification ====
Format

The qualification round took place on June 30 at 17:25h (GMT+8). Each player competed in two rounds and four players with the highest score advances to the knockout stage. In a case of a tie, the tied players would have to perform again and in case they were still tied, the jury would have to decide the player who will advance through a majority decision.

Country	Dunker	1st round	2nd round	Total
Belgium	Vincent Peeters	27	27	54
Philippines	Florencio Serrano	25	23	48
China	Haonan Li	24	24	48
Slovenia	Matej Susec	22	23	45
Turkey	Mert Halavurte	19	25	44
New Zealand	Isaia Jones	18	24	42
Hungary	Krisztian Hargitai	23	0	23
Ukraine	Ivan Myskovets	0	0	0

==== Knockout stage ====
The knockout stage consisting of a semi-final and final phase took place on July 2.

Semi-final

The top two players advances to the final round.

Country	Dunker	1st round	2nd round	Total
Belgium	Vincent Peeters	27	25	52
Philippines	Florencio Serrano	24	24	48
Slovenia	Matej Susec	23	25	48

Final

The time limit was eliminated for the final and the two players competed for three rounds instead of two.

Country	Dunker	1st round	2nd round	3rd round	Total
Belgium	Vincent Peeters	27	29	30	86
Philippines	Florencio Serrano	23	0	15	38

Results

	Team	Player
1st place, gold medalist(s)	Belgium	Vincent Peeters
2nd place, silver medalist(s)	Philippines	Florencio Serrano
3rd place, bronze medalist(s)	Slovenia	Matej Susec

== Awards ==
Team of the Tournament

- (Belgium) Ayoub Nouhi
- (Belgium) Vincent Peeters
- (Slovenia) Samo Gabersek

MVP

- (Belgium) Ayoub Nouhi

2017 FIBA 3x3 U18 World Champions – Men's

Belgium
1st title
