= 2018 FIBA 3x3 World Cup – Individual contests =

As part of the 2018 FIBA 3x3 World Cup held from June 8 to 12, 2018, three tournaments in addition to the main 3x3 men's and women's tournaments were contested. The Dunk-out contest was for men, the Skills contest for women, and the Shoot-out contest for both men and women.

== Dunk contest ==
=== Qualification phase ===
Format

Each player competed in two rounds and four players with the highest score advances to the knockout stage. In a case of a tie, the tied players would have to perform again and in case they were still tied, the jury would have to decide the player who will advance through a majority decision.

Country	Dunker	1st round	2nd round	Total
France	Guy Dupuy	26	27	53
Ukraine	Vadym Poddubchenko	24	24	48
Philippines	David Carlos	21	26	47
Ukraine	Dmytro Krivenko	23	24	47
Lithuania	Gediminas Zitlinskas	23	0	23
Philippines	Rey Guevarra	19	0	19
Poland	Piotr Renkiel	16	0	16

=== Knockout stage ===
==== Semi-final ====
The top two players advances to the final round.

Country	Dunker	1st round	2nd round	Total
France	Guy Dupuy	24	27	51
Ukraine	Dmytro Krivenko	27	24	51
Philippines	David Carlos	21	25	46
Ukraine	Vadym Poddubchenko	24	0	24

==== Final ====
Two players will compete for three rounds instead of two.

Country	Dunker	1st round	2nd round	3rd round	Total
Ukraine	Dmytro Krivenko	23	30	26	79
France	Guy Dupuy	0	30	30	60

=== Results ===
	Team	Player
1st place, gold medalist(s)	Ukraine	Dmytro Krivenko
2nd place, silver medalist(s)	France	Guy Dupuy
3rd place, bronze medalist(s)	Philippines	David Carlos

== Skills contest ==
The skills contest was contested by women players from the qualified 3x3 national teams of the main tournament. Each team can enter at most a single player for the competition. The contest which had a time limit of 45 seconds involves a qualification phase and a knockout round. The players begins on the starting line on the side of their choice. Upon a signal, the player must execute the following in order:

- A corner shot
- Pass a slalom through 4 cones while dribbling
- A straight pass into a targe
- Pass another slalom with 2 balls forward and then backwards
- Another straight pass
- Dribble through a slalom and score the basket

The four women with the best time record qualify for the knock-out round

=== Qualification phase ===
Day 1
Country	Player	Time
France	Marie-Eve Paget	20"41
Switzerland	Nancy Fora	25"86
Hungary	Alexandra Theodorean	26"05
Kazakhstan	Zalina Kurazova	26"20
Philippines	Afril Bernardino	29"15
China	Li Yingyun	—
Germany	Luana Rodefled	—

Day 2
Country	Player	Time
United States	Sabrina Ionescu	27"3
Turkmenistan	Nigyar Nagiyeva	27"35
Italy	Rae Lin D'Alie	30
Malaysia	Wei Yin Saw	30
Russia	Anna Leshkovtseva	30
Andorra	Claudia Brunet	—
Indonesia	Fanny Kalumata	—
Iran	Mozhgan Khodadadi	—
Uganda	Gloria Lamunu	—

=== Knockout round ===
==== Semifinal ====
Head to head
2	Alexandra Theodorean (Hungary)	W–L	3	(Switzerland) Nancy Fora
1	Marie-Ève Paget (France)	W–L	4	(Kazakhstan) Zalina Kurazova

==== Finals ====
Bronze medal match

Head to head
3	Zalina Kurazova (Kazakhstan)	W–L	4	(Switzerland) Nancy Fora

Gold medal match

Head to head
2	Alexandra Theodorean (Hungary)	W–L	1	(France) Marie-Ève Paget

=== Result ===
	Team	Player
1st place, gold medalist(s)	Hungary	Alexandra Theodorean
2nd place, silver medalist(s)	France	Marie-Eve Panget
3rd place, bronze medalist(s)	Kazakhstan	Zalina Kurazova

== Shoot-out contest ==
The shoot-out contest is a mixed-gender competition with at most one male and one female player from 3x3 national teams participating in the main tournaments.

=== Qualification phase ===
Format

Each player were to attempt 10 shots with every successful shot worth one point

- Five from the right wing
- Five from the left wing (45º angle from the baseline) and with a 30" shot clock.

Two male and two female players with the most points in the shortest amount of time advance to the final. In case of a tie or players scoring the same points within the same amount of time, the tied players were tasked to shoot again. The round concluded on June 11, 2018.

Men

Day 1
Country	Player	Score	Time
Croatia	Marin Hrvoje	7	23"
Japan	Tatsuhito Noro	5	26"
Latvia	Edgars Krumins	5	27"
Nigeria	David Godwin	5	29"
Poland	Michael Hicks	4	27"
Slovenia	Adin Kavgic	4	28"
Ukraine	Maksym Zakurdaiev	4	28"
Jordan	Ali El-Zubi	3	30"

Day 2
Country	Player	Score	Time
Russia	Maksim Dybovskii	6	24"
Serbia	Dejan Majstorovic	6	24"
Indonesia	Eric Gosal	6	25"
Canada	Steve Sir	6	26"
Kyrgyzstan	Shkirzhan Kuranbaev	5	29"
Philippines	Troy Rosario	2	25"
Mongolia	Tsenguunbayar Gotov	1	28"
Brazil	Luiz Felipe Soriani	1	30"
Romania	Vlad Dumitrescu	0	29"

Women

Day 3
Country	Player	Score	Time
Philippines	Janine Pontejos	6	22"
China	Jiaying Jiang	6	30"
Spain	Paula Palomares	5	24"
Kazakhstan	Tamara Yagodkina	5	26"
Switzerland	Evita Herminjard	5	27"
France	Johanna Tayeau	3	26"
Netherlands	Karin Kuijt	3	27"
Germany	Lara Muller	3	29"
Hungary	Nora Rukaj	2	27"
Argentina	Victoria Llorente	1	30"

Day 4
Country	Player	Score	Time
Russia	Alexandra Stolyar	7	30"
Turkmenistan	Leyla Malilova	5	27"
Andorra	Eva Villarrublia	5	28"
Indonesia	Jovita Elizhabet Simon	5	28"
Iran	Elli Saeedeh	3	25"
Czech Republic	Andrea Ovsikova	3	26"
Uganda	Jamila Nansikombi	3	30"
United States	Erin Boley	2	28"
Malaysia	Fook Yee Yap	1	29"
Italy	Marcella Filippi	1	30"

=== Final ===
Format

Players were to attempt 18 shots from four different locations:

- Five from the right wing (45° angle from the baseline)
- Five from the top of the arc
- Five from the left wing (45° from the baseline)
- Three from the 3x3 logo.

Shots made from the 3x3 are worth 2 points while the rest of the shots of are worth 1 point. The tiebreaker which was used in the qualification phase is used again for the final.

Final was held on June 12, 2018 was won by Janine Pontejos of the Philippines' women's team. She won over Alexandra Stolyar of Russia's women's team due to a better time record despite both players having tied scores.

Country	Player	Gender	Score	Time
Philippines	Janine Pontejos	W	14	41"86
Russia	Alexandra Stolyar	W	14	49"9
Croatia	Marin Hrvoje	M	11	
Russia	Maksim Dybovskii	M	7	

=== Results ===
	Team	Player
1st place, gold medalist(s)	Philippines (W)	Janine Pontejos
2nd place, silver medalist(s)	Russia (W)	Alexandra Stolyar
3rd place, bronze medalist(s)	Croatia (M)	Marin Hrvoje
