= 2017 FIBA 3x3 Europe Cup – Women's tournament =

2017 FIBA 3x3 Europe Cup Men's tournament
Tournament information
- Dates: July 7–9
- Host: (Netherlands) Amsterdam
- Venue: Museum Square
- Teams: 12

The Women's Tournament of the 2017 FIBA 3x3 Europe Cup took place at the Museumplein in Amsterdam, the Netherlands. Twelve teams participated in the women's tournament.

== Participating teams ==
Netherlands, as host country, and eleven more teams qualified to the final tournament through the two qualifiers played in Andorra and France.

Group A

- Hungary (1)
- Switzerland (8)
- Romania (9)

Group B

- Russia (2)
- Spain (7)
- Slovakia (10)

Group C

- Czech Republic (3)
- Italy (6)
- Serbia (11)

Group D

- France (4)
- Netherlands (5)
- Ireland (12)

== Players ==
Team	Players (World Ranking as of July 7, 2017)	Ref.
Czech Republic	Sára Krumpholcová (176), Kristýna Minarovičová (413), Tereza Vorlová (425), Kateřina Novotná (605)	
France	Alice Nayo (590), Perrine Le Leuch (592), Caroline Hériaud (729), Ana Maria Filip (2487)	
Hungary	Alexandra Theodorean (199), Krisztina Süle (410), Bettina Bozóki (553), Dóra Medgyessy (600)	
Ireland	Claire Rockall (4604), Niamh Dwyer (7568), Grainne Dwyer (7725), Fiona O'Dwyer (7749)	
Italy	Marcella Filippi (519), Federica Tognalini (903), Alice Richter (1361), Rae Lin D'alie (1852)	
Netherlands	Karin Kuijt (1558), Jacobine Klerx (3935), Loyce Bettonvil (4233), Sharon Beld (–)	
Romania	Andra Haas (532), Sonia Ursu (606), Anca Sipos (649), Gabriela Marginean (1961)	
Russia	Anna Leshkovtseva (525), Aleksandra Stolyar (581), Anastasia Logunova (906), Tatiana Petrushina (1002)	
Serbia	Biljana Pešović (14238), Jelena Maksimović (1115), Ana Radović (4212), Maja Škorić (18575)	
Slovakia	Alexandra Riecka (1175), Mária Felixová (1186), Pavla Bertovič (1191), Alexandra Pribulová (1630)	
Spain	Aitana Cuevas (693), Paula Palomares (702), Cristina Hurtado (887), Irene San Román (3623)	
Switzerland	Sarah Kershaw (622), Marielle Giroud (659), Alexia Rol (667), Caroline Turin (1757)	

== Pool play ==
=== Pool A ===
Pos	Team	Pld	W	L	PF	PA	PD	PCT	Qualification	(Switzerland)	(Hungary)	(Romania)
1	Switzerland	2	2	0	33	25	+8	1.000	Advance to quarterfinals	—	19–15	14–10
2	Hungary	2	1	1	28	20	+8	.500	Advance to quarterfinals	—	—	18–6
3	Romania	2	0	2	21	37	−16	.000		—	—	—

Source: FIBA
Rules for classification: 1) Winning percentage; 2) Head-to-head; 3) Points scored.

=== Pool B ===
Pos	Team	Pld	W	L	PF	PA	PD	PCT	Qualification	(Russia)	(Spain)	(Slovakia)
1	Russia	2	2	0	36	24	+12	1.000	Advance to quarterfinals	—	14–13	22–11
2	Spain	2	1	1	34	18	+16	.500	Advance to quarterfinals	—	—	21–4
3	Slovakia	2	0	2	15	43	−28	.000		—	—	—

Source: FIBA
Rules for classification: 1) Winning percentage; 2) Head-to-head; 3) Points scored.

=== Pool C ===
Pos	Team	Pld	W	L	PF	PA	PD	PCT	Qualification	(Italy)	(Serbia)	(Czech Republic)
1	Italy	2	2	0	35	21	+14	1.000	Advance to quarterfinals	—	21–11	14–10
2	Serbia	2	1	1	28	30	−2	.500	Advance to quarterfinals	—	—	18–16
3	Czech Republic	2	0	2	27	39	−12	.000		—	—	—

Source: FIBA
Rules for classification: 1) Winning percentage; 2) Head-to-head; 3) Points scored.

=== Pool D ===
Pos	Team	Pld	W	L	PF	PA	PD	PCT	Qualification	(France)	(Netherlands)	(Republic of Ireland)
1	France	2	2	0	32	24	+8	1.000	Advance to quarterfinals	—	13–11	19–13
2	Netherlands (H)	2	1	1	28	20	+8	.500	Advance to quarterfinals	—	—	17–7
3	Ireland	2	0	2	20	36	−16	.000		—	—	—

Source: FIBA
Rules for classification: 1) Winning percentage; 2) Head-to-head; 3) Points scored.
(H) Hosts

== Knockout stage ==
Quarterfinals
9 July
Switzerland	10
Netherlands	20
9 July
Italy	11
Spain	15
9 July
Russia	18
Serbia	9
9 July
France	17
Hungary	11

Semifinals
9 July
Netherlands	9
Spain	11
9 July
Russia	16
France	12

Final
9 July
Spain	14
Russia	22
Third place
9 July
Netherlands	19
France	15

Source: FIBA

== Final standings ==
Pos	Team	Pld	W	L	PF
1	Russia	5	5	0	92
2	Spain	5	3	2	74
3	Netherlands	5	3	2	76
4	France	5	3	2	76
5	Italy	3	2	1	46
6	Switzerland	3	2	1	43
7	Hungary	3	1	2	39
8	Serbia	3	1	2	37
9	Czech Republic	2	0	2	27
10	Romania	2	0	2	21
11	Ireland	2	0	2	20
12	Slovakia	2	0	2	15
