= 2014 FIBA 3x3 World Championships =

Чемпионат мира 2014 ФИБА 3x3

Tournament details
- Host country: Russia
- City: Moscow
- Dates: 5–8 June 2014
- Teams: 48
- Venue: 1 (in 1 host city)

The 2014 FIBA 3x3 World Championships, hosted by Russia, was an international 3x3 basketball event that feature separate competitions for men's and women's national teams. The tournament was run from 5 June to 8 June 2014 in Moscow. It is co-organized by the FIBA.

Qatar won their first title after defeating Serbia 18–13 in the men's final. In the women's it was the defending champions USA that defeated Russia 15-8.

== Medalists ==
Event	Gold	Silver	Bronze
Men's	Qatar	Serbia	Russia
Women's	United States	Russia	Belgium

== Participating teams ==
=== Men ===
Group A

- Poland
- Germany
- United States
- Netherlands
- Czech Republic
- Tunisia

Group B

- Romania
- Lithuania
- Russia
- Venezuela
- Argentina
- Qatar

Group C

- Brazil
- Turkey
- Estonia
- Uruguay
- New Zealand
- Puerto Rico

Group D

- Slovenia
- Serbia
- Japan
- Croatia
- Indonesia
- China

=== Women ===
Group A

- Romania
- Switzerland
- Uruguay
- Belgium
- Italy
- Syria

Group B

- Andorra
- France
- China
- Uganda
- Indonesia
- Russia

Group C

- Czech Republic
- Germany
- Netherlands
- Estonia
- Thailand
- Tunisia

Group D

- Spain
- Brazil
- United States
- Hungary
- Ukraine
- Argentina
