= FIBA 3x3 World Cup =

International 3x3 basketball tournament

- Sport: 3x3 basketball
- Founded: 2012
- No. of teams: 24
- Country: FIBA members
- Continent: FIBA (International)
- Most recent champions: Latvia (men); United States (women)
- Most titles: Serbia (men; 6 titles); United States (women; 4 titles)

The FIBA 3x3 World Cup is a 3x3 basketball tournament for national teams organized by the International Basketball Federation (FIBA). The debut of the tournament originally named as the FIBA 3x3 World Championship was held in August 2012 in Athens, Greece. The current champions are Latvia in the men's division and United States in the women's division.

There are two events in the tournament: one for men and another for women. In the first edition, there was a mixed event where each team was composed of 2 men and 2 women.

== Men ==
=== Summary ===
Year	Hosts	Final			Third place match		
Year	Hosts	Champions	Score	Runners-up	Third place	Score	Fourth place
2012; Details	(Greece); Athens	Serbia	16–13	France	Ukraine	19–18	Israel
2014; Details	(Russia); Moscow	Qatar	18–13	Serbia	Russia	19–18	Lithuania
2016; Details	(China); Guangzhou	Serbia	21–16	United States	Slovenia	17–16	Spain
2017; Details	(France); Nantes	Serbia	21–18	Netherlands	France	18–17	Slovenia
2018; Details	(Philippines); Bocaue	Serbia	16–13	Netherlands	Slovenia	21–16	Poland
2019; Details	(Netherlands); Amsterdam	United States	18–14	Latvia	Poland	18–15	Serbia
2022; Details	(Belgium); Antwerp	Serbia	21–16	Lithuania	France	18–17	Belgium
2023; Details	(Austria); Vienna	Serbia	21–19	United States	Latvia	22–12	Brazil
2025; Details	(Mongolia); Ulaanbaatar	Spain	21–17	Switzerland	Serbia	21–16	Germany
2026; Details	(Poland); Warsaw	Latvia	20–15	Germany	Serbia	20–19	France
2027; Details	Singapore						

=== Medal table ===
Rank	Nation	Gold	Silver	Bronze	Total
1	Serbia	6	1	2	9
2	United States	1	2	0	3
3	Latvia	1	1	1	3
4	Qatar	1	0	0	1
4	Spain	1	0	0	1
6	Netherlands	0	2	0	2
7	France	0	1	2	3
8	Germany	0	1	0	1
8	Lithuania	0	1	0	1
8	Switzerland	0	1	0	1
11	Slovenia	0	0	2	2
12	Poland	0	0	1	1
12	Russia	0	0	1	1
12	Ukraine	0	0	1	1
Totals (14 entries)		10	10	10	30

=== Participating teams ===
Nation	(Greece) 2012	(Russia) 2014	(China) 2016	(France) 2017	(Philippines) 2018	(Netherlands) 2019	(Belgium) 2022	(Austria) 2023	(Mongolia) 2025	(Poland) 2026	(Singapore) 2027	Total
Andorra	–	–	13th	13th	–	–	–	–	–	–		2
Argentina	12th	18th	–	–	–	–	–	–	–	–		2
Australia	–	–	–	–	–	10th	–	15th	10th	19th		4
Austria	–	–	–	–	–	–	12th	6th	11th	7th		4
Belgium	–	–	–	–	–	–	4th	11th	15th	12th		4
Brazil	22nd	19th	–	–	18th	18th	16th	4th	–	13th		7
Bulgaria	16th	–	–	–	–	–	–	–	–	–		1
Canada	–	–	–	–	6th	–	–	–	13th	–		2
Chile	–	–	–	–	–	–	15th	–	–	–		1
China	–	15th	18th	–	–	19th	17th	–	8th	17th		6
Chinese Taipei	–	–	–	–	–	–	20th	–	–	–		1
Croatia	–	5th	–	–	10th	–	–	–	–	–		2
Czech Republic	15th	6th	–	–	–	–	–	–	–	9th		3
Egypt	14th	–	16th	18th	–	–	18th	–	–	–		4
El Salvador	–	–	–	19th	–	–	–	–	–	–		1
England	11th	–	–	–	–	–	–	–	–	–		1
Estonia	17th	10th	–	14th	9th	15th	–	–	–	–		5
France	2nd	–	–	3rd	–	6th	3rd	8th	17th	4th		7
Germany	–	23rd	–	–	–	–	11th	17th	4th	2nd		5
Great Britain	–	–	–	–	–	–	–	–	14th	–		1
Greece	6th	–	–	–	–	–	–	–	–	–		1
Guam	23rd	–	–	–	–	–	–	–	–	–		1
Hungary	–	–	7th	–	–	–	–	19th	–	–		2
Indonesia	–	24th	12th	16th	20th	–	–	–	–	–		4
Israel	4th	–	–	–	–	–	–	14th	–	–		2
Italy	–	–	15th	–	–	–	–	–	–	–		1
Japan	–	20th	11th	–	14th	14th	19th	12th	12th	20th		8
Jordan	–	–	–	–	19th	–	–	–	–	–		1
Kyrgyzstan	–	–	–	–	16th	–	–	–	–	–		1
Latvia	18th	–	–	–	5th	2nd	6th	3rd	7th	1st	Q	8
Lebanon	21st	–	–	–	–	–	–	–		–		1
Lithuania	–	4th	–	–	–	9th	2nd	10th	16th	5th		6
Madagascar	–	–	–	–	–	–	–	16th	20th	11th		3
Mexico	20th	–	–	–	–	–	–	–	–	–		1
Mongolia	–	–	–	–	8th	13th	9th	18th	19th	15th		6
Montenegro	–	–	–	–	–	–	–	–	18th	–		1
Nepal	24th	–	–	–	–	–	–	–	–	–		1
Netherlands	–	21st	6th	2nd	2nd	11th	5th	5th	9th	6th		9
New Zealand	–	12th	19th	15th	13th	–	10th	–	–	10th		6
Nigeria	–	–	–	–	17th	–	–	–	–	–		1
Philippines	–	–	9th	11th	11th	–	–	–	–	–		3
Poland	–	7th	20th	10th	4th	3rd	8th	7th	–	18th		8
Puerto Rico	–	16th	–	9th	–	5th	13th	13th	6th	16th		7
Qatar	–	1st	5th	6th	–	12th	–	–	–	–		4
Romania	10th	8th	14th	12th	15th	–	–	–	–	–		5
Russia	5th	3rd	10th	8th	12th	16th	DQ	–	–	–		6
Serbia	1st	2nd	1st	1st	1st	4th	1st	1st	3rd	3rd		10
Singapore	–	–	–	–	–	–	–	–	–	–	Q	1
Slovenia	9th	9th	3rd	4th	3rd	7th	14th	20th	–	–		8
South Korea	–	–	–	17th	–	17th	–	–	–	–		2
Spain	13th	–	4th	–	–	–	–	–	1st	14th		4
Sri Lanka	–	–	–	20th	–	–	–	–	–	–		1
Switzerland	–	–	–	–	–	–	–	9th	2nd	–		2
Tunisia	–	11th	–	–	–	–	–	–	–	–		1
Turkey	19th	17th	17th	–	–	20th	–	–	–	–		4
Ukraine	3rd	–	–	5th	7th	8th	–	–	–	–		4
United States	7th	14th	2nd	7th	–	1st	7th	2nd	5th	8th		9
Uruguay	–	13th	8th	–	–	–	–	–	–	–		2
Venezuela	8th	22nd	–	–	–	–	–	–	–	–		2
Total	24	24	20	20	20	20	20	20	20	20	20	

== Women ==
=== Summary ===
Year	Hosts	Final			Third place match		
Year	Hosts	Champions	Score	Runners-up	Third place	Score	Fourth place
2012; Details	(Greece); Athens	United States	17–16	France	Australia	18–17	Ukraine
2014; Details	(Russia); Moscow	United States	15–8	Russia	Belgium	14–12	Czech Republic
2016; Details	(China); Guangzhou	Czech Republic	21–11	Ukraine	United States	20–14	Spain
2017; Details	(France); Nantes	Russia	19–12	Hungary	Ukraine	15–13	Netherlands
2018; Details	(Philippines); Bocaue	Italy	16–12	Russia	France	21–14	China
2019; Details	(Netherlands); Amsterdam	China	19–13	Hungary	France	21–9	Australia
2022; Details	(Belgium); Antwerp	France	16–13	Canada	China	21–11	Lithuania
2023; Details	(Austria); Vienna	United States	16–12	France	Australia	21–20	China
2025; Details	(Mongolia); Ulaanbaatar	Netherlands	15–9	Mongolia	Canada	21–9	Poland
2026; Details	(Poland); Warsaw	United States	21–20	Australia	Netherlands	21–14	Azerbaijan
2027; Details	Singapore						

=== Medal table ===
Rank	Nation	Gold	Silver	Bronze	Total
1	United States	4	0	1	5
2	France	1	2	2	5
3	Russia	1	2	0	3
4	China	1	0	1	2
4	Netherlands	1	0	1	2
6	Czech Republic	1	0	0	1
6	Italy	1	0	0	1
8	Hungary	0	2	0	2
9	Australia	0	1	2	3
10	Canada	0	1	1	2
10	Ukraine	0	1	1	2
12	Mongolia	0	1	0	1
13	Belgium	0	0	1	1
Totals (13 entries)		10	10	10	30

=== Participating teams ===
Nation	(Greece) 2012	(Russia) 2014	(China) 2016	(France) 2017	(Philippines) 2018	(Netherlands) 2019	(Belgium) 2022	(Austria) 2023	(Mongolia) 2025	(Poland) 2026	(Singapore) 2027	Total
Andorra	–	24th	16th	14th	20th	18th	–	–	–	–		5
Angola	20th	–	–	–	–	–	–	–	–	–		1
Argentina	11th	10th	8th	11th	16th	–	–	–	–	–		5
Australia	3rd	–	11th	9th	–	4th	–	3rd	5th	2nd		7
Austria	–	–	–	–	–	–	18th	7th	16th	–		3
Azerbaijan	–	–	–	–	–	–	–	–	–	4th		1
Bahrain	–	–	–	19th	–	–	–	–	–	–		1
Belgium	–	3rd	–	–	–	–	8th	–	–	–		2
Brazil	18th	15th	–	–	–	–	11th	14th	14th	–		5
Bulgaria	12th	–	–	–	–	–	–	–	–	–		1
Canada	–	–	–	–	–	–	2nd	6th	3rd	14th		4
Chile	–	–	–	–	–	–	14th	–	19th	–		2
China	–	11th	10th	17th	4th	1st	3rd	4th	10th	10th		9
Chinese Taipei	7th	–	15th	–	–	–	–	–	–	–		2
Cook Islands	–	–	20th	–	–	–	–	–	–	–		1
Czech Republic	6th	4th	1st	7th	6th	9th	–	10th	13th	12th		9
Egypt	–	–	–	–	–	–	16th	13th	–	–		2
England	14th	–	–	–	–	–	–	–	–	–		1
Estonia	16th	13th	–	–	–	–	–	–	–	–		2
France	2nd	5th	5th	10th	3rd	3rd	1st	2nd	8th	8th		10
Germany	13th	8th	–	12th	15th	–	9th	5th	11th	5th		8
Greece	8th	–	–	–	–	–	–	–	–	–		1
Hungary	5th	22nd	6th	2nd	8th	2nd	–	17th	12th	7th		9
Indonesia	–	17th	17th	–	19th	20th	–	–	–	–		4
Iran	–	–	–	–	14th	16th	–	–	–	–		2
Israel	–	–	–	–	–	–	19th	11th	–	–		2
Italy	–	20th	9th	5th	1st	8th	–	12th	15th	19th		8
Japan	–	–	19th	13th	–	13th	13th	9th	9th	15th		7
Jordan	22nd	–	–	–	–	–	–	–	–	–		1
Kazakhstan	–	–	–	15th	18th	–	–	–	–	–		2
Kyrgyzstan	–	–	–	20th	–	–	–	–	–	–		1
Latvia	–	–	–	–	–	15th	–	–	17th	9tzh		3
Lithuania	–	–	–	–	–	–	4th	15th	–	11th		3
Macau	–	–	18th	–	–	–	–	–	–	–		1
Madagascar	–	–	–	–	–	–	–	–	20th	20th		2
Malaysia	–	–	–	–	10th	–	–	–	–	–		1
Mexico	23rd	–	–	–	–	–	–	–	–	–		1
Mongolia	–	–	–	–	–	17th	12th	18th	2nd	18th		5
Nepal	24th	–	–	–	–	–	–	–	–	–		1
Netherlands	21st	12th	7th	4th	9th	12th	10th	16th	1st	3rd	Q	11
New Zealand	–	–	12th	–	–	10th	15th	–	–	–		3
Philippines	–	–	–	–	17th	–	–	–	–	17th		2
Poland	–	–	13th	–	–	–	6th	19th	4th	16th		5
Romania	17th	7th	14th	–	–	7th	17th	20th	–	–		6
Russia	9th	2nd	–	1st	2nd	6th	DQ	–	–	–		5
Singapore	–	–	–	–	–	–	–	–	–	–	Q	1
Slovakia	19th	–	–	–	–	–	–	–	–	–		1
Spain	10th	9th	4th	8th	7th	5th	5th	8th	7th	13th		10
Switzerland	–	6th	–	6th	11th	11th	–	–	–	–		4
Syria	–	21st	–	–	–	–	–	–	–	–		1
Thailand	–	23rd	–	–	–	–	–	–	–	–		1
Tunisia	–	18th	–	–	–	–	–	–	–	–		1
Turkey	15th	–	–	–	–	–	–	–	–	–		1
Turkmenistan	–	–	–	16th	12th	19th	–	–	–	–		3
Uganda	–	14th	–	–	13th	–	–	–	–	–		2
Ukraine	4th	19th	2nd	3rd	–	14th	–	–	18th	6th		7
United States	1st	1st	3rd	–	5th	–	7th	1st	6th	1st		8
Uruguay	–	16th	–	–	–	–	–	–	–	–		1
Venezuela	–	–	–	18th	–	–	–	–	–	–		1
Total	24	24	20	20	20	20	19	20	20	20	20	

== Mixed ==
=== Summary ===
Year	Hosts	Final			Third place match		
Year	Hosts	Champions	Score	Runners-up	Third place	Score	Fourth place
2012; Details	(Greece); Athens	France	14–8	Argentina	Ukraine	15–8	Czech Republic

=== Medal table ===
Rank	Nation	Gold	Silver	Bronze	Total
1	France	1	0	0	1
2	Argentina	0	1	0	1
3	Ukraine	0	0	1	1
Totals (3 entries)		1	1	1	3

=== Participating teams ===
Nation	(Greece) 2012
Argentina	2nd
Brazil	10th
Bulgaria	5th
Czech Republic	4th
England	7th
Estonia	8th
France	1st
Greece	11th
Jordan	15th
Mexico	6th
Nepal	16th
Romania	12th
Russia	9th
Spain	14th
Turkey	13th
Ukraine	3rd

== Overall medal table ==
Rank	Nation	Gold	Silver	Bronze	Total
1	Serbia	6	1	2	9
2	United States	5	2	1	8
3	France	2	3	4	9
4	Netherlands	1	2	1	4
4	Russia	1	2	1	4
6	Latvia	1	1	1	3
7	China	1	0	1	2
8	Czech Republic	1	0	0	1
8	Italy	1	0	0	1
8	Qatar	1	0	0	1
8	Spain	1	0	0	1
12	Hungary	0	2	0	2
13	Ukraine	0	1	3	4
14	Australia	0	1	2	3
15	Canada	0	1	1	2
16	Argentina	0	1	0	1
16	Germany	0	1	0	1
16	Lithuania	0	1	0	1
16	Mongolia	0	1	0	1
16	Switzerland	0	1	0	1
21	Slovenia	0	0	2	2
22	Belgium	0	0	1	1
22	Poland	0	0	1	1
Totals (23 entries)		21	21	21	63

== Individual contests ==
=== Dunk contest ===
Year	Host	Final		Semifinalists	
Year	Host	(gold) Gold	(silver) Silver	(bronze) Bronze	
2012; Details	(Greece); Athens	(Venezuela) Deivi Añanguren Madriz	(United States) Adesanya Adetayo	(Bulgaria) Georgi Bojanov (England) Ometayo Ogedengbe	
2014; Details	(Russia); Moscow	(Tunisia) Firas Lahyani	(China) Yan Pengfei	(United States) Demetrius Miller (Croatia) Toni Vitali	
Year	Host	(gold) Gold	(silver) Silver	(bronze) Bronze	Fourth place
2016; Details	(China); Guangzhou	(Ukraine) Dmytro Krivenko	(United States) Alfonzo McKinnie	(Italy) Marco Favretto	(Netherlands) Sjoerd Van Vilsteren
2017; Details	(France); Nantes	(Poland) Rafal Lipinski	(United States) Chris Staples	(Ukraine) Vadym Poddubchenko	(United States) Jordan Southerland
2018; Details	(Philippines); Bocaue	(Ukraine) Dmytro Krivenko	(France) Guy Dupuy	(Philippines) David Carlos	(Ukraine) Vadym Poddubchenko
2019; Details	(Netherlands) Amsterdam	(Ukraine) Vadym Piddubchenko	(Poland) Piotr Grabowski	(Latvia) Kristaps Dargais	

=== Skills contest ===
Year	Host	Finals			
Year	Host	(gold) Gold	(silver) Silver	(bronze) Bronze	
2012; Details	(Greece); Athens	(Estonia) Pirgit Puu	(United States) Skylar Diggins	(Turkey) Burcu Cigil (France) Sylvie Gruszczynski	
2014; Details	(Russia); Moscow	(Italy) Valentina Baldelli	(Belgium) Hind Abdelkader	(United States) Jewell Loyd (France) Fleur Devillers	
Year	Host	(gold) Gold	(silver) Silver	(bronze) Bronze	Fourth place
2016; Details	(China); Guangzhou	(Hungary) Alexandra Theodorean	(Andorra) Marta Fodor	(New Zealand) Georgia Agnew	(Chinese Taipei) Liu Hsi-Yeh
2017; Details	(France); Nantes	(Andorra) Claudia Brunet	(Netherlands) Karin Kuijt	(Japan) Yuri Hanada	(China) Yusen Liu
2018; Details	(Philippines); Bocaue	(Hungary) Alexandra Theodorean	(France) Marie-Ève Paget	(Kazakhstan) Zalina Kurazova	(Switzerland) Nancy Fora
2019; Details	(Netherlands); Amsterdam	(France) Marie-Ève Paget	(Italy) Rae Lin D'Alie	(Iran) Shadi Abdolvand	

=== Shoot-out contest ===
Year	Host	Finals			
Year	Host	(gold) Gold	(silver) Silver	(bronze) Bronze	
2012; Details	(Greece); Athens	(Czech Republic) Stanislav Votroubek	(Bulgaria) Radoslava Bachvarova	(Germany) Charlotte Hoere (Russia) Mikhail Gyunter	
2014; Details	(Russia); Moscow	(Argentina) Daniel Hure	(Switzerland) Sarah Kershaw	(Indonesia) Christian Gunawan (Spain) Yurena Diaz	
Year	Host	(gold) Gold	(silver) Silver	(bronze) Bronze	Fourth place
2016; Details	(China); Guangzhou	(Romania) Angel Santana	(Spain) Paula Palomares	(United States) Natalie Romeo	(Turkey) Tanalp Sengun
2017; Details	(France); Nantes	(France) Angelo Tsagarakis	(Netherlands) Joey Schelvis	(Czech Republic) Mihaela Uhrova	(Russia) Tatiana Petrushina
2018; Details	(Philippines); Bocaue	(Philippines) Janine Pontejos	(Russia) Alexandra Stolyar	(Croatia) Marin Hrvoje	(Russia) Maksim Dybovskii

=== Free-throw pursuit ===
Year	Host	Finals		
Year	Host	(gold) Gold	(silver) Silver	(bronze) Bronze
2014; Details	(Russia); Moscow	(Romania) Angel Santana	(Belgium) Ann Wauters	(Spain) Amaya Gastaminza (Brazil) Douglas Motta

== See also ==
- FIBA 3x3 U23 World Cup
- FIBA 3x3 U18 World Cup
- World Street 3s
