= FIBA 3x3 Europe Cup =

Basketball event

- Sport: 3x3 basketball
- Founded: 2014
- No. of teams: 12
- Country: FIBA Europe members
- Continent: Europe
- Most recent champions: M: Latvia (2nd title); W: Netherlands (3rd title)
- Most titles: M: Serbia (5 titles); W: France (3 titles)

The FIBA 3x3 Europe Cup had its inaugural tournament in 2014 in Bucharest, Romania. There are two events in the championship, one men's event and one women's event. Each team has four players (three on court and one on the bench). The match is played on a half court and every rule applies as well as a 12-second shot clock and clearance needed on a new possession.

== Men's tournament ==
=== Summary ===
#	Year	Host	Final			Third place match		
#	Year	Host	Champion	Score	Second place	Third place	Score	Fourth place
1	2014; Details	(Romania); Bucharest	Romania	19–16	Slovenia	Lithuania	21–18	Greece
2	2016; Details	(Romania); Bucharest	Slovenia	19–17	Serbia	Netherlands	22–16	Russia
3	2017; Details	(Netherlands); Amsterdam	Latvia	16–13	Slovenia	Ukraine	20–18	Serbia
4	2018; Details	(Romania); Bucharest	Serbia	19–18	Latvia	Slovenia	21–15	Russia
5	2019; Details	(Hungary); Debrecen	Serbia	21–18	France	Lithuania	21–18	Spain
6	2021; Details	(France); Paris	Serbia	20–14	Lithuania	Poland	19–18	Russia
7	2022; Details	(Austria); Graz	Serbia	21–14	Latvia	Netherlands	21–10	Lithuania
8	2023; Details	(Israel); Jerusalem	Serbia	22–20	Lithuania	Latvia	22–19	France
9	2024; Details	(Austria); Vienna	Austria	18–17	Serbia	Lithuania	21–18	Switzerland
10	2025; Details	(Denmark); Copenhagen	Lithuania	21–17	Latvia	Italy	22–15	Germany
11	2026; Details	(Belgium); Antwerp	Latvia	19–10	Netherlands	France	21–14	Serbia
12	2027; Details	(Greece); Athens						

=== Medal table ===
Rank	Nation	Gold	Silver	Bronze	Total
1	Serbia	5	2	0	7
2	Latvia	2	3	1	6
3	Lithuania	1	2	3	6
4	Slovenia	1	2	1	4
5	Austria	1	0	0	1
5	Romania	1	0	0	1
7	Netherlands	0	1	2	3
8	France	0	1	1	2
9	Italy	0	0	1	1
9	Poland	0	0	1	1
9	Ukraine	0	0	1	1
Totals (11 entries)		11	11	11	33

=== Participating teams ===
Nation	(Romania) 2014	(Romania) 2016	(Netherlands) 2017	(Romania) 2018	(Hungary) 2019	(France) 2021	(Austria) 2022	(Israel) 2023	(Austria) 2024	(Denmark) 2025	(Belgium) 2026	(Greece) 2027	Total
Andorra	16th												1
Austria					6th	12th	6th	5th	1st	8th			5
Azerbaijan	11th						12th		12th				3
Belgium	6th			9th		9th	7th	7th			8th		6
Bosnia and Herzegovina				12th									1
Croatia								11th	11th				2
Cyprus								12th					1
Czech Republic	13th	9th	12th					8th					4
Denmark										10th			1
Estonia	8th					7th					11th		3
France		10th	5th	7th	2nd	5th		4th	6th	5th	3rd		9
Germany					11th			9th	10th	4th	5th		5
Great Britain									8th				1
Greece	4th											Q	2
Hungary			11th	8th	7th		9th			11th			5
Ireland										12th	12th		2
Israel	9th					11th	8th	10th					4
Italy	15th	5th								3rd	10th		4
Latvia			1st	2nd	10th		2nd	3rd	9th	2nd	1st	Q	9
Lithuania	3rd				3rd	2nd	4th	2nd	3rd	1st	7th		8
Montenegro							10th						1
Netherlands		3rd	7th		12th	6th	3rd	6th	5th	6th	2nd		9
Poland		8th		5th	5th	3rd	5th						5
Romania	1st	7th		11th									3
Russia	10th	4th	6th	4th	9th	4th							6
Serbia	5th	2nd	4th	1st	1st	1st	1st	1st	2nd	7th	4th		11
Slovakia		12th											1
Slovenia	2nd	1st	2nd	3rd		10th	11th						6
Spain	7th	6th	8th	6th	4th				7th		6th		7
Switzerland	14th		9th	10th					4th	9th	9th		6
Turkey	12th		10th										2
Ukraine		11th	3rd		8th	8th							4
Total	16	12	12	12	12	12	12	12	12	12	12	12	

== Women's tournament ==
=== Summary ===
#	Year	Host	Final			Third place match		
#	Year	Host	Champion	Score	Second place	Third place	Score	Fourth place
1	2014; Details	(Romania); Bucharest	Russia	16–13	Slovenia	Belgium	16–10	Netherlands
2	2016; Details	(Romania); Bucharest	Hungary	21–14	Romania	Russia	15–13	Switzerland
3	2017; Details	(Netherlands); Amsterdam	Russia	22–14	Spain	Netherlands	19–15	France
4	2018; Details	(Romania); Bucharest	France	21–5	Netherlands	Ukraine	17–16	Italy
5	2019; Details	(Hungary); Debrecen	France	14–12	Spain	Latvia	17–13	Netherlands
6	2021; Details	(France); Paris	Spain	16–12	Germany	France	19–13	Russia
7	2022; Details	(Austria); Graz	France	21–14	Netherlands	Poland	16-13	Spain
8	2023; Details	(Israel); Jerusalem	Netherlands	21–18	Spain	Lithuania	22–14	Portugal
9	2024; Details	(Austria); Vienna	Spain	19–11	France	Netherlands	21–14	Poland
10	2025; Details	(Denmark); Copenhagen	Netherlands	21–16	Azerbaijan	Spain	21–15	France
11	2026; Details	(Belgium); Antwerp	Netherlands	16–13	Spain	Azerbaijan	21–18	Slovenia
12	2027; Details	(Greece); Athens						

=== Medal table ===
Rank	Nation	Gold	Silver	Bronze	Total
1	Netherlands	3	2	2	7
2	France	3	1	1	5
3	Spain	2	4	1	7
4	Russia	2	0	1	3
5	Hungary	1	0	0	1
6	Azerbaijan	0	1	1	2
7	Germany	0	1	0	1
7	Romania	0	1	0	1
7	Slovenia	0	1	0	1
10	Belgium	0	0	1	1
10	Latvia	0	0	1	1
10	Lithuania	0	0	1	1
10	Poland	0	0	1	1
10	Ukraine	0	0	1	1
Totals (14 entries)		11	11	11	33

=== Participating teams ===
Nation	(Romania) 2014	(Romania) 2016	(Netherlands) 2017	(Romania) 2018	(Hungary) 2019	(France) 2021	(Austria) 2022	(Israel) 2023	(Austria) 2024	(Denmark) 2025	(Belgium) 2026	(Greece) 2027	Total
Austria		12th					11th		6th	12th			4
Azerbaijan									11th	2nd	3rd		3
Belarus				11th	6th								2
Belgium	3rd	11th		7th		11th					7th		5
Cyprus							10th						1
Czech Republic	12th	5th	9th	8th				7th			8th		6
Denmark					9th					10th			2
Estonia							8th						1
France			4th	1st	1st	3rd	1st	6th	2nd	4th	6th		9
Germany						2nd	5th	8th	5th	5th	5th		6
Great Britain						10th				11th			2
Greece	14th											Q	2
Hungary		1st	7th	9th	5th	5th		11th	9th	8th	11th		9
Ireland	11th		11th										2
Israel	13th					12th		9th					3
Italy		9th	5th	4th	11th			5th	10th				6
Latvia	16th				3rd				7th				3
Lithuania	5th					6th	6th	3rd		7th			5
Luxembourg								12th					1
Netherlands	4th		3rd	2nd	4th	9th	2nd	1st	3rd	1st	1st	Q	11
Poland					12th		3rd		4th	6th	10th		5
Portugal							9th	4th					2
Romania	6th	2nd	10th	5th	10th	8th	12th		12th				8
Russia	1st	3rd	1st		7th	4th							5
Serbia		7th	8th	12th									3
Slovakia	15th		12th										2
Slovenia	2nd	10th									4th		3
Spain	10th	8th	2nd	6th	2nd	1st	4th	2nd	1st	3rd	2nd		11
Sweden											9th		1
Switzerland	8th	4th	6th	10th			7th						5
Turkey	7th												1
Ukraine	9th	6th		3rd	8th	7th		10th	8th	9th	12th		9
Total	16	12	12	12	12	12	12	12	12	12	12	12	

== Overall medal table ==
Rank	Nation	Gold	Silver	Bronze	Total
1	Serbia	5	2	0	7
2	Netherlands	3	3	4	10
3	France	3	2	2	7
4	Spain	2	4	1	7
5	Latvia	2	3	2	7
6	Russia	2	0	1	3
7	Slovenia	1	3	1	5
8	Lithuania	1	2	4	7
9	Romania	1	1	0	2
10	Austria	1	0	0	1
10	Hungary	1	0	0	1
12	Azerbaijan	0	1	1	2
13	Germany	0	1	0	1
14	Poland	0	0	2	2
14	Ukraine	0	0	2	2
16	Belgium	0	0	1	1
16	Italy	0	0	1	1
Totals (17 entries)		22	22	22	66

== See also ==
- FIBA 3x3 U17 Europe Cup
- EuroBasket
- EuroBasket Women
