= Ireland men's national 3x3 team =

National 3x3 basketball team

Ireland
- FIBA zone: FIBA Europe
- National federation: Basketball Ireland
- Coach: Darren McGovern

FIBA 3x3 Europe Cup
- Appearances: 2

The Ireland men's national 3x3 team is a national basketball team of Ireland, administered by Basketball Ireland. It represents the country in international 3x3 basketball competitions.

== Europe Cup record ==
Year	Position	Pld	W	L
(Romania) 2014 Bucharest	Did not qualify			
(Romania) 2016 Bucharest	Did not qualify			
(Netherlands) 2017 Amsterdam	Did not qualify			
(Romania) 2018 Bucharest	Did not qualify			
(Hungary) 2019 Debrecen	Did not qualify			
(France) 2021 Paris	Did not qualify			
(Austria) 2022 Graz	Did not qualify			
(Israel) 2023 Jerusalem	Did not qualify			
(Austria) 2024 Vienna	Did not qualify			
(Denmark) 2025 Copenhagen	12th	2	0	2
(Belgium) 2026 Antwerp	12th	2	0	2
Total	2/11	4	0	4

== Current roster ==
Squad for FIBA 3x3 Europe Cup Qualifiers in Pristina.

Name	Club
Ryan Leonard	(Republic of Ireland) Limerick Sport Eagles
Lucien Christofis	(Iceland) Körfuknattleiksfélag ÍA
Jordan Blount	(Republic of Ireland) Killorgan CYMS
Matt Treacy	(Iceland) Skallagrímur

== Results ==
=== 2026 FIBA 3x3 Europe Cup Qualifiers ===
13 June 2026
15:15

Boxscore

Ireland	19–21	Cyprus
Pts: Treacy 10		Pts: Tretiakov 9

Pristina
Referees: Pedro Maia, Ognjen Vidaković

13 June 2026
19:10

Boxscore

Ireland	19–16	Kosovo
Pts: Treacy 10		Pts: Ukaj 7

Pristina
Referees: Michail Vanglovskij, Pedro Maia

14 June 2026
17:25

Boxscore

Albania	15–21	Ireland
Pts: three players 4		Pts: Treacy 12

Pristina
Referees: Michail Vanglovskij, Lavinia Gheorghe

14 June 2026
18:30

Boxscore

Cyprus	13–21	Ireland
Pts: Markou, Maragkos 4		Pts: Leonard 7

Pristina
Referees: Pedro Maia, Lavinia Gheorghe
