= France mixed national 3x3 team =

National 3x3 basketball team

France
- FIBA zone: FIBA Europe

FIBA 3x3 World Championships
- Appearances: 1
- Medals: Gold: (2012)

The France mixed national 3x3 team is a national basketball team of France, administered by the Fédération Française de Basketball.

It represents the country in international 3x3 (3 against 3) mixed basketball competitions. (a "mixed" team consists of 2 men and 2 women)

== See also ==
- France men's national 3x3 team
- France women's national 3x3 team
