= Argentina mixed national 3x3 team =

National 3x3 basketball team

Argentina
- FIBA zone: FIBA Americas

FIBA 3x3 World Championships
- Appearances: 1
- Medals: Silver: 2012

Copa America
- Appearances: ?

The Argentina mixed national 3x3 team is a national basketball team of Argentina, governed by the Confederación Argentina de Basquetbol. It represents the country in international 3x3 (3 against 3) mixed men's and women's basketball competitions.

== See also ==
- Argentina men's national 3x3 team
- Argentina women's national 3x3 team
