= Jan Driessen =

Dutch basketball player (born 1996)

Personal information
- Born: 4 December 1996 (age 29)
- Listed height: 2.01 m (6 ft 7 in)

Career information
- Playing career: 2014–2017

Career history
- 2014–2017: ZZ Leiden
Medals
Men's 3x3 basketball
Representing the Netherlands
Olympic Games
Gold medal – first place	2024 Paris	Team
Europe Cup
Silver medal – second place	2026 Antwerp	Team
Bronze medal – third place	2018 Bucharest
Bronze medal – third place	2022 Graz

Jan Driessen (born 4 December 1996) is a Dutch basketball player. He represented the Netherlands at the 2024 Summer Olympics in 3x3 event and won the gold medal with the Dutch national 3x3 team.

== 5x5 basketball career ==
After playing for their under-20 team, Driessen made his professional debut for ZZ Leiden in the Dutch Basketball League (DBL) in the 2014–15 season, under coach Eddy Casteels. He was named to the DBL All-Rookie Team, and signed a two-year contract in July 2015. On 17 December 2016, he scored a career-high 14 points against Apollo Amsterdam.

In June 2017, Driessen decided to return to amateur-level play with Lokomotief, in order to focus on his academic career. He played 80 games for Leiden, scoring 158 points in 822 minutes.

== Personal life ==
Driessen is the older brother of Noortje Driessen who also plays basketball.
