= Dmytro Lypovtsev =

Ukrainian basketball player (born 1986)

No. 13 – BC Zaporizhya
- Position: Forward
- League: USL

Personal information
- Born: 10 October 1986 (age 40)
- Listed height: 6 ft 8 in (2.03 m)

Career information
- Playing career: 2004–present

Career history
- 2004–2005: Spartak
- 2010–2011: Aviastr
- 2011–2013: Musony
- 2013–2015: Hoverla
- 2015–2017: Kryvbas
- 2017–2019: Cherkaski Mavpy
- 2019–present: Zaporizhya
Medals
Men's 3x3 basketball
Representing Ukraine
World Championships
Bronze medal – third place	2012 Athens	Team
Bronze medal – third place	2012 Athens	Mixed team
European Championships
Bronze medal – third place	2017 Amsterdam	Team

Dmytro Lypovtsev (Ukrainian: Дмитро Липовцев; born 10 October 1986) is a Ukrainian basketball player for BC Zaporizhya and the Ukrainian national 3x3 team. With national team, he won two bronze medals at the 2012 FIBA 3x3 World Championships in Athens, Greece, and bronze at the 2017 FIBA 3x3 Europe Cup in Amsterdam, Netherlands.
