= 2027 FIBA 3x3 Europe Cup – Men's tournament =

Tournament details
- Host country: Greece
- City: Athens
- Dates: 16–19 September
- Teams: 12

The 2027 FIBA 3x3 Europe Cup will be the 12th edition of this continental championship. The event will be held in Athens, Greece from 16 to 19 September 2027.

== Venue ==
The venue will be at the Syntagma Square.

2027 FIBA 3x3 Europe Cup – Men's tournament is located in Greece	Athens
2027 FIBA 3x3 Europe Cup – Men's tournament is located in Greece	Syntagma Square

== Qualification ==
12 teams will participate.

	Vacancies	Qualified
Host nation	1	Greece
Defending champions	1	Latvia
3x3 World Rankings	5	
Qualifier	2	
Qualifier	2	
Qualifier	1	
Total	12	
