= Austria women's national 3x3 team =

National 3x3 basketball team

Austria
- FIBA ranking: 15
- FIBA zone: FIBA Europe
- National federation: ÖBV

World Cup
- Appearances: 3

Europe Cup
- Appearances: 4

The Austria women's national 3x3 team is a national basketball team of Austria, administered by the Basketball Austria. It represents the country in international 3x3 (3 against 3) women's basketball competitions.

== Competitions ==
=== Summer Olympics ===
Year	Position	Pld	W	L
(Japan) 2020 Tokyo	Did not qualify			
(France) 2024 Paris	Did not qualify			
Total	0/2	0	0	0

=== World Cup ===
Year	Position	Pld	W	L
(Greece) 2012 Athens	Did not qualify			
(Russia) 2014 Moscow	Did not qualify			
(China) 2016 Guangzhou	Did not qualify			
(France) 2017 Nantes	Did not qualify			
(Philippines) 2018 Bocaue	Did not qualify			
(Netherlands) 2019 Amsterdam	Did not qualify			
(Belgium) 2022 Antwerp	18th	4	0	4
(Austria) 2023 Vienna	7th	5	3	2
(Mongolia) 2025 Ulaanbaatar	16th	4	1	3
(Poland) 2026 Warsaw	To be determined			
2027 Singapore	To be determined			
Total	3/9	13	4	9

=== European Championships ===
Year	Position	Pld	W	L
(Romania) 2014 Bucharest	Did not qualify			
(Romania) 2016 Bucharest	12th	2	0	2
(Netherlands) 2017 Amsterdam	Did not qualify			
(Romania) 2018 Bucharest	Did not qualify			
(Hungary) 2019 Debrecen	Did not qualify			
(France) 2021 Paris	Did not qualify			
(Austria) 2022 Graz	11th	2	0	2
(Israel) 2023 Jerusalem	Did not qualify			
(Austria) 2024 Vienna	6th	3	1	2
(Denmark) 2025 Copenhagen	12th	2	0	2
Total	4/9	9	1	8

== See also ==
- Austria women's national basketball team
