= Ukraine men's national 3x3 team =

National 3x3 basketball team

Ukraine
- Joined FIBA: 1992
- FIBA zone: FIBA Europe
- National federation: Ukrainian Basketball Federation

World Championships
- Appearances: 4
- Medals: Bronze (1): 2012
Home	Away
Medal record
Representing Ukraine
World Championships
Bronze medal – third place	2012 Greece
EuropeanChampionships
Bronze medal – third place	2017 Netherlands
World Mixed Championships
Bronze medal – third place	2012 Greece

The Ukrainian men's national 3x3 team represents Ukraine in international 3x3 basketball matches and is controlled by the Ukrainian Basketball Federation.

== Senior Competitions ==
=== World Championships ===
Year	Position	Pld	W	L
2012 Greece	3rd	9	7	2
2014 Russia	Did not compete			
2016 China	Did not compete			
2017 France	5th	5	4	1
2018 Philippines	7th	5	3	2
2019 Netherlands	8th	5	3	2
2022 Belgium	Did not compete			
2023 Austria	Did not compete			
2025 Mongolia	Did not compete			
2026 Poland	Did not compete			
Total	4/10	24	17	7

Mixed Team

Year	Position	Pld	W	L
2012 Greece	3rd	4	3	1
Total	1/1	4	3	1

=== European Championships ===
Year	Position	Pld	W	L
2014 Romania	Did not compete			
2016 Romania	11th	2	0	2
2017 Netherlands	3rd	5	4	1
2018 Romania	Did not compete			
2019 Hungary	8th	3	1	2
2021 France	7th	3	1	2
2022 Austria	Did not compete			
2023 Israel	Did not compete			
2024 Austria	Did not compete			
2025 Denmark	Did not compete			
2026 Belgium	Did not compete			
Total	4/11	13	6	7

== See also ==
- 3x3 basketball
