= José Rojas (basketball) =

Mexican basketball player (1923–1991)

Personal information
- Full name: José Rojas Herrera
- Born: 9 November 1923 Orizaba, Mexico
- Died: 23 June 1991 (aged 67) Guadalajara, Mexico

Sport
- Sport: Basketball

José Rojas Herrera (9 November 1923 – 23 June 1991) was a Mexican basketball player. He competed in the men's tournament at the 1948 Summer Olympics and the 1952 Summer Olympics. Rojas died in Guadalajara on 23 June 1991, at the age of 67.
