= Switzerland men's national 3x3 team =

Basketball team

Switzerland
- FIBA zone: FIBA Europe

World Cup
- Appearances: 2
- Medals: Silver: 2025

Europe Cup
- Appearances: 6

The Switzerland men's national 3x3 team is a national basketball team of Switzerland, governed by the Fédération Suisse de Basketball. It represents the country in international 3x3 (3 against 3) basketball competitions. They have won no medals.

== Tournament record ==
=== World Cup ===
Year	Position	Pld	W	L
(Greece) 2012 Athens	did not qualify			
(Russia) 2014 Moscow	did not qualify			
(China) 2016 Guangzhou	did not qualify			
(France) 2017 Nantes	did not qualify			
(Philippines) 2018 Bocaue	did not qualify			
(Netherlands) 2019 Amsterdam	did not qualify			
(Belgium) 2022 Antwerp	did not qualify			
(Austria) 2023 Vienna	9th	5	3	2
(Mongolia) 2025 Ulaanbaatar	2nd	7	5	2
(Poland) 2026 Warsaw	did not qualify			
2027 Singapore	to be determined			
Total	2/11	12	8	4

=== Europe Cup ===
Year	Position	Pld	W	L
(Romania) 2014 Bucharest	14th	3	0	3
(Romania) 2016 Bucharest	Did not qualify			
(Netherlands) 2017 Amsterdam	9th	2	0	2
(Romania) 2018 Bucharest	10th	2	0	2
(Hungary) 2019 Debrecen	Did not qualify			
(France) 2021 Paris	Did not qualify			
(Austria) 2022 Graz	Did not qualify			
(Israel) 2023 Jerusalem	Did not qualify			
(Austria) 2024 Vienna	4th	5	3	2
(Denmark) 2025 Copenhagen	9th	2	0	2
(Belgium) 2026 Antwerp	9th	2	0	2
Total	6/11	16	3	13

== See also ==
- Switzerland men's national basketball team
- Switzerland women's national 3x3 team
