= Czech Republic men's national 3x3 team =

National 3x3 basketball team

Czech Republic
- FIBA ranking: 13
- FIBA zone: FIBA Europe
- National federation: ČBF

World Cup
- Appearances: 3

Europe Cup
- Appearances: 4

The Czech Republic men's national 3x3 team is the 3x3 basketball team representing Czech Republic in international men's competitions.

== Competitions ==
=== World Cup ===
Year	Position	Pld	W	L
(Greece) 2012 Athens	15th	6	2	4
(Russia) 2014 Moscow	6th	7	5	2
(China) 2016 Guangzhou	Did not qualify			
(France) 2017 Nantes	Did not qualify			
(Philippines) 2018 Bocaue	Did not qualify			
(Netherlands) 2019 Amsterdam	Did not qualify			
(Belgium) 2022 Antwerp	Did not qualify			
(Austria) 2023 Vienna	Did not qualify			
(Mongolia) 2025 Ulaanbaatar	Did not qualify			
(Poland) 2026 Warsaw	9th	5	3	2
2027 Singapore	To be determined			
Total	3/11	18	10	8

=== European Championships ===
Year	Position	Pld	W	L
(Romania) 2014 Bucharest	13th	3	0	3
(Romania) 2016 Bucharest	9th	2	0	2
(Netherlands) 2017 Amsterdam	12th	2	0	2
(Romania) 2018 Bucharest	Did not qualify			
(Hungary) 2019 Debrecen	Did not qualify			
(France) 2021 Paris	Did not qualify			
(Austria) 2022 Graz	Did not qualify			
(Israel) 2023 Jerusalem	8th	3	1	2
(Austria) 2024 Vienna	Did not qualify			
(Denmark) 2025 Copenhagen	Did not qualify			
(Belgium) 2026 Antwerp	Did not qualify			
Total	4/12	10	1	9
