= 2026 FIBA 3x3 Europe Cup – Men's tournament =

Tournament details
- Host country: Belgium
- City: Antwerp
- Dates: 11–13 September
- Teams: 12

Final positions
- Champions: Latvia (2nd title)
- Runners-up: Netherlands
- Third place: France
- Fourth place: Serbia

Tournament statistics
- MVP: (Latvia) Kristaps Gludītis

The 2026 FIBA 3x3 Europe Cup was the 11th edition of this continental championship. The event was held in Antwerp, Belgium from 11 to 13 September 2026.

Latvia won their second title with a win over the Netherlands.

== Qualification ==
12 teams participated.

	Vacancies	Qualified
Host nation	1	Belgium
Defending champions	1	Lithuania
3x3 World Rankings	5	France; Germany; Netherlands; Serbia; Latvia
Slovakia Qualifier	2	Italy; Switzerland
Romania Qualifier	2	Estonia; Spain
Kosovo Qualifier	1	Ireland
Total	12	

== Preliminary round ==
The pools were announced on 7 July 2026.

=== Pool A ===
Pos	Team	Pld	W	L	PF	PA	PR	Qualification	SRB	BEL	SUI
1	Serbia	2	2	0	43	29	1.483	Quarterfinals		21–16	22–13
2	Belgium (H)	2	1	1	35	37	0.946	Quarterfinals			19–16
3	Switzerland	2	0	2	29	41	0.707				

Source: FIBA
Legend: Blue = home team win; Yellow = draw; Red = away team win.
Rules for classification: 1) Wins; 2) Head-to-head record; 3) Points scored.
(H) Hosts

=== Pool B ===
Pos	Team	Pld	W	L	PF	PA	PR	Qualification	ESP	NED	ITA
1	Spain	2	2	0	35	24	1.458	Quarterfinals			21–11
2	Netherlands	2	1	1	32	31	1.032	Quarterfinals	13–14		19–17
3	Italy	2	0	2	28	40	0.700				

Source: FIBA
Legend: Blue = home team win; Yellow = draw; Red = away team win.
Rules for classification: 1) Wins; 2) Head-to-head record; 3) Points scored.

=== Pool C ===
Pos	Team	Pld	W	L	PF	PA	PR	Qualification	LAT	LTU	IRL
1	Latvia	2	2	0	43	32	1.344	Quarterfinals			21–16
2	Lithuania	2	1	1	37	31	1.194	Quarterfinals	16–22		21–9
3	Ireland	2	0	2	25	42	0.595				

Source: FIBA
Legend: Blue = home team win; Yellow = draw; Red = away team win.
Rules for classification: 1) Wins; 2) Head-to-head record; 3) Points scored.

=== Pool D ===
Pos	Team	Pld	W	L	PF	PA	PR	Qualification	GER	FRA	EST
1	Germany	2	2	0	42	29	1.448	Quarterfinals			21–14
2	France	2	1	1	33	35	0.943	Quarterfinals	15–21		18–14
3	Estonia	2	0	2	28	39	0.718				

Source: FIBA
Legend: Blue = home team win; Yellow = draw; Red = away team win.
Rules for classification: 1) Wins; 2) Head-to-head record; 3) Points scored.

== Knockout stage ==
Quarter-finals
13 September
Serbia (OT)	21
Lithuania	19
13 September
Germany	14
Netherlands	16
13 September
Spain	14
France	21
13 September
Latvia	21
Belgium	18

Semi-finals
13 September
Serbia	14
Netherlands	20
13 September
France	15
Latvia	17

Final
13 September
Netherlands	10
Latvia	19
Third place
13 September
Serbia	14
France	21

== Final ranking ==
Rank	Team	Record
1st place, gold medalist(s)	Latvia	5–0
2nd place, silver medalist(s)	Netherlands	3–2
3rd place, bronze medalist(s)	France	3–2
4	Serbia	3–2
5	Germany	2–1
6	Spain	2–1
7	Lithuania	1–2
8	Belgium	1–2
9	Switzerland	0–2
10	Estonia	0–2
11	Italy	0–2
12	Ireland	0–2
