= France men's national 3x3 team =

3x3 basketball team representing France

France
- FIBA ranking: 11
- Joined FIBA: 1933
- FIBA zone: FIBA Europe
- National federation: FFBB

Olympic Games
- Appearances: 1
- Medals: Silver: (2024)

World Cup
- Appearances: 7
- Medals: Silver: (2012); Bronze: (2017, 2022)

Europe Cup
- Appearances: 9
- Medals: Silver: 2019
Home	Away
Medal record
Men's 3x3 basketball
Representing France
Olympic Games
Silver medal – second place	2024 Paris
World Cup
Silver medal – second place	2012 Athens
Bronze medal – third place	2017 Nantes	Team
Bronze medal – third place	2022 Antwerp	Team
Europe Cup
Silver medal – second place	2019 Debrecen
Mediterranean Games
Gold medal – first place	2018 Tarragona	Team
Gold medal – first place	2022 Oran	Team

The France men's national 3x3 team is the 3x3 basketball team representing France in international men's competitions, organized and run by the Fédération Française de Basket-Ball.

== Senior competitions ==
=== Summer Olympics ===
Year	Position	Pld	W	L	Players
(Japan) 2020 Tokyo	did not qualify				
(France) 2024 Paris	2nd	10	5	5	Dussoulier, Vergiat, Rambaut, Seguela
Total	1/2	10	5	5	

=== FIBA 3x3 World Cup ===
Year	Pos	Pld	W	L
(Russia) 2012 Athens	Runner-up	9	7	2
(Greece) 2014 Moscow	did not qualify			
(China) 2016 France	did not qualify			
(France) 2017 Nantes	3rd	7	5	2
(Philippines) 2018 Bocaue	did not qualify			
(Netherlands) 2019 Amsterdam	6th	5	3	2
(Belgium) 2022 Antwerp	3rd	8	5	3
(Austria) 2023 Vienna	8th	6	2	4
(Mongolia) 2025 Ulaanbaatar	17th	4	1	3
(Poland) 2026 Warsaw	4th	8	5	3
2027 Singapore	to be determined			
Total	7/11	47	28	19

=== FIBA 3x3 Europe Cup ===
Year	Final tournament				Qualifier		
Year	Pos	Pld	W	L	Pld	W	L
(Romania) 2014	did not participate				did not enter		
(Romania) 2016	10th	2	0	2	5	5	0
(Netherlands) 2017	5th	3	2	1	5	4	1
(Romania) 2018	7th	3	1	2	qualified		
(Hungary) 2019	2nd	5	3	2	qualified		
(France) 2021	5th	3	1	2	qualified		
(Austria) 2022	did not participate				did not enter		
(Israel) 2023	4th	5	3	2	qualified		
(Austria) 2025	6th	3	2	1	qualified		
(Denmark) 2025	5th	3	2	1	qualified		
(Belgium) 2026	Qualified				qualified		
Total	9/11	27	14	13	10	9	1

=== Mediterranean Games ===
Year	Pos	Pld	W	L
(Spain) 2018	Champions	6	6	0
(Algeria) 2022	Champions	5	4	1
Total	2/2	11	10	1

=== Champions Cup ===
Year	Position	Pld	W	L
(Thailand) 2025 Bangkok	5th	3	2	1
(Thailand) 2026 Bangkok	did not qualify			
Total	1/2	3	2	1

== See also ==
- Fédération Française de Basket-Ball
- France national basketball team
- France women's national 3x3 team
- France mixed national 3x3 team
