= Netherlands men's national 3x3 team =

National 3x3 basketball team

Netherlands
- FIBA ranking: 5
- Joined FIBA: 1946
- FIBA zone: FIBA Europe
- National federation: NBB

Olympic Games
- Appearances: 2
- Medals: Gold : (2024)

World Cup
- Appearances: 9
- Medals: Silver: (2017, 2018)

Europe Cup
- Appearances: 9
- Medals: Bronze : (2016, 2022, 2026)
Home	Away
Medal record
Representing Netherlands
Men's 3x3 basketball
Olympic Games
Gold medal – first place	2024 Paris	Team
World Cup
Silver medal – second place	2017 Nantes	Team
Silver medal – second place	2018 Bocaue	Team
Champions Cup
Silver medal – second place	2025 Bangkok	Team
Europe Cup
Silver medal – second place	2026 Antwerp	Team
Bronze medal – third place	2016 Bucharest
Bronze medal – third place	2022 Graz

The Netherlands men's national 3x3 team is the 3x3 basketball team representing the Netherlands in international men's competitions, organized and run by the Nederlandse Basketball Bond. In 2024, the team won the gold medal at the Paris 2024 Olympic Games.

With the 5x5 national team qualifying just once for the FIBA World Cup back in 1986, the Netherlands shifted the focus onto 3x3 basketball instead and managed to qualify for the first two ever Olympic competitions. The team finished 5th in 2020 and became Olympic champion in 2024, defeating host country France in the final with a Worthy de Jong two-point buzzer-beater in overtime.

The men's team is also a two time world silver medallist at the FIBA 3x3 World Cup (2017, 2018) and a two times European bronze medallist at the FIBA 3x3 Europe Cup (2016, 2022). The most successful Dutch player is Dimeo van der Horst who won three medals (Olympic gold, world silver and European bronze) with the squad.

== Competitions ==
=== Summer Olympics ===
Year	Position	Pld	W	L	Players
(Japan) 2020 Tokyo	5th	8	4	4	Bekkering, Van der Horst, Slagter, Voorn
(France) 2024 Paris	1st	9	7	2	Driessen, Van der Horst, Slagter, De Jong
(United States) 2028 Los Angeles	future event				
Total	2/2	17	11	6	

=== World Cup ===
Year	Position	Pld	W	L	Players
(Greece) 2012 Athens	did not qualify				
(Russia) 2014 Moscow	21st	5	1	4	
2016 China	6th	5	3	2	
(France) 2017 Nantes	2nd	7	6	1	Jobse, Schelvis, Van Vilsteren, Rozendaal
(Philippines) 2018 Bocaue	2nd	7	5	2	Jobse, Roijé, Van Vilsteren, Van der Horst
(Netherlands) 2019 Amsterdam	11th	4	2	2	Roijé, Van der Horst, Jobse, Van Vilsteren
(Belgium) 2022 Antwerp	5th	5	4	1	Jaring, Slagter, Van der Horst, Voorn
(Austria) 2023 Vienna	5th	5	4	1	Driessen, Slagter, Worthy De Jong, Van der Horst
(Mongolia) 2025 Ulaanbaatar	9th	5	3	2	Alberts, Driessen, De Jong, Van der Horst
(Poland) 2026 Warsaw	6th	6	4	2	Alberts, Driessen, De Jong, Van Tilborg
2027 Singapore	To be determined				
Total	9/11	49	32	17	

=== European Championships ===
Year	Position	Pld	W	L	Players
(Romania) 2014 Bucharest	did not qualify				
(Romania) 2016 Bucharest	3rd	5	4	1	
(Netherlands) 2017 Amsterdam	7th	3	1	2	Jobse, Schelvis, Van Vilsteren, Rozendaal
(Romania) 2018 Bucharest	did not qualify				
(Hungary) 2019 Debrecen	12th	2	0	2	Jobse, Roijé, Van Vilsteren, Van der Horst
(France) 2021 Paris	6th	3	1	2	Driessen, Jaring, Slagter, Van der Horst
(Austria) 2022 Graz	3rd	5	4	1	Driessen, Jaring, Slagter, Van der Horst
(Israel) 2023 Jerusalem	6th	3	1	2	Jaring, Slagter, Van der Horst, De Jong
(Austria) 2024 Vienna	5th	3	2	1	Driessen, Jaring, Slagter, De Jong
(Denmark) 2025 Copenhagen	6th	3	2	1	Agasi, Alberts, Driessen, Van der Horst
(Belgium) 2026 Antwerp	2nd	5	3	2	Agasi, Driessen, Van Tilborg, De Jong
Total	9/11	32	18	14	

=== Champions Cup ===
Year	Position	Pld	W	L
(Thailand) 2025 Bangkok	2nd	5	3	2
(Thailand) 2026 Bangkok	3rd	5	4	1
Total	2/2	10	7	3

== Team ==
=== Current roster ===
Netherlands men's national 3x3 team roster
Players
Coaches

Pos.	No.	Name	Age – Date of birth	Height	Club	Ctr.
F	2	Julian Jaring (C)	31 – 18 October 1990	1.96 m (6 ft 5 in)
G	8	Bryan Alberts	30 – 29 December 1994	1.96 m (6 ft 5 in)
G	13	Dimeo van der Horst	30 – 23 June 1991	1.97 m (6 ft 6 in)
G	54	Worthy de Jong	34 – 14 March 1988	1.93 m (6 ft 4 in)
F	4	Jan Driessen	25 – 4 December 1996	2.01 m (6 ft 7 in)

Head coach

Assistant coach

Legend

- (C) Team captain
- Age – describes age
  on 22 June 2022

=== List of players ===
This list contains all players who played for the Netherlands 3x3 team:

Player	Position	Tenure
Aron Royé	G	
Jesper Jobse	G	
Bas Rozendaal	C	
Joey Schelvis	G	
Sjoerd van Vilsteren	G	
Matthew van Tongeren	F	
Dimeo van der Horst	G	2018–present
Julian Jaring	F	
Arvin Slagter	G	2020–present
Jessey Voorn	G	2020–present
Ross Bekkering	C	2021–present
Jason Dourisseau	F	2021

=== World rankings ===
World Rank	NED Rank	Player	Games	Ranking Points
34 ▼	1	Jesper Jobse	230	513,800
40 ▲	2	Sjoerd van Vilsteren	189	491,200
41 ▲	3	Joey Schelvis	201	489,400
52 ▲	4 ▲	Matthew van Tongeren	159	425,700

Updated as of 13 May 2017

== See also ==
- Netherlands men's national basketball team
