= Hungary men's national 3x3 team =

National 3x3 basketball team

Hungary
- FIBA zone: FIBA Europe

World Cup
- Appearances: 2

Europe Cup
- Appearances: 5

The Hungary men's national 3x3 team is a national basketball team of Hungary, administered by the Hungarian Basketball Federation. It represents the country in international 3x3 (3 against 3) basketball competitions.

== Competitions ==
=== World Cup ===
Year	Position	Pld	W	L
(Greece) 2012	Did not qualify			
(Russia) 2014	Did not qualify			
(China) 2016	7th	5	3	2
(France) 2017	Did not qualify			
(Philippines) 2018	Did not qualify			
(Netherlands) 2019	Did not qualify			
(Belgium) 2022	Did not qualify			
(Austria) 2023	19th	4	0	4
(Mongolia) 2025	Did not qualify			
(Poland) 2026	Did not qualify			
(Singapore) 2027	To be determined			
Total	2/11	9	3	5

=== Europe Cup ===
Year	Position	Pld	W	L
(Romania) 2014	Did not qualify			
(Romania) 2016	Did not qualify			
(Netherlands) 2017	Group Stage	2	0	2
(Romania) 2018	QF	3	1	2
(Hungary) 2019	7th	3	1	2
(France) 2021	Did not qualify			
(Austria) 2022	9th	2	0	2
(Israel) 2023	Did not qualify			
(Austria) 2024	Did not qualify			
(Denmark) 2025	11th	2	0	2
(Belgium) 2026	Did not qualify			
Total	5/10	12	2	10

== Squad ==
Name	Pos	Age	High	Club
Máté Mohácsi	G	28	1.94 m	(Hungary) Budapest
Àkos Horvàth	G	37	1.94 m	(Hungary) Budapest
Attila Demeter	G/F	21	1.99 m	(Hungary) Budapest
Tamás Ivosev	C	28	2.01 m	(Serbia) (United Arab Emirates) Novi Sad Al-Wahda

== See also ==
- Hungary men's national basketball team
- Hungary women's national 3x3 team
