= Russia men's national 3x3 team =

National 3x3 basketball team

Russia
- Joined FIBA: 1992
- FIBA zone: FIBA Europe
- National federation: RBF

Olympic Games
- Appearances: 1
- Medals: Silver: 2020

FIBA 3x3 World Championships
- Appearances: 6
- Medals: Bronze: 2014

FIBA Europe 3x3 Championships
- Appearances: 4
Home	Away
Medal record
Representing (Russia) ROC
Olympic Games
Silver medal – second place	2020 Tokyo	Men's team
Representing Russia
World Cup
Bronze medal – third place	2014 Moscow	Men's team
European Games
Gold medal – first place	2015 Baku	Men's team
Gold medal – first place	2019 Minsk	Men's team

The Russia men's national 3x3 team is the 3x3 basketball team representing Russia in international men's competitions, organized and run by the Russian Basketball Federation. After the 2022 Russian invasion of Ukraine, FIBA banned Russian teams and officials from participating in FIBA 3x3 Basketball competitions.

== Senior Competitions ==
=== Summer Olympics ===
Year	Position	Pld	W	L
(Japan) 2020 Tokyo	2nd	10	5	5
Total	1/1	10	5	5

=== Performance at World Championships ===
Year	Pos	Pld	W	L
(Greece) 2012	Quarter Finals	7	6	1
(Russia) 2014	3rd	9	6	3
(China) 2016	10th	4	2	2
(France) 2017	8th	5	3	2
(Philippines) 2018	13th	4	1	3
(Netherlands) 2019	16th	4	1	3

=== Performance at Europe Championships ===
Year	Final tournament				Qualifier		
Year	Pos	Pld	W	L	Pld	W	L
(Romania) 2014	10th	3	1	2	6	4	2
(Netherlands) 2017	6th	3	1	2	—		
(Romania) 2018	4th	5	2	3	3	3	0
(Hungary) 2019	9th	2	1	1	—		
(France) 2021	4th	5	3	2	—		

=== Performance at European Games ===
Year	Pos	Pld	W	L
(Azerbaijan) 2015	1st	7	7	0
(Belarus) 2019	1st	6	5	1

== See also ==
- Russian Basketball Federation
- Russia national basketball team
- Russia women's national 3x3 team
