= 2025 FIBA 3x3 Europe Cup – Men's tournament =

Tournament details
- Host country: Denmark
- City: Copenhagen
- Dates: 5–7 September
- Teams: 12

Final positions
- Champions: Lithuania (1st title)
- Runners-up: Latvia
- Third place: Italy
- Fourth place: Germany

The 2025 FIBA 3x3 Europe Cup was the tenth edition of this continental championship. The event was held in Copenhagen, Denmark from 5 to 7 September 2025.

Lithuania won their first title with a win over Latvia.

== Qualification ==
12 teams participated.

	Date	Vacancies	Qualified
Host nation		1	Denmark
Defending champions	22–25 August 2024	1	Austria
3x3 World Rankings	1 January 2025	3	Netherlands; France; Serbia
Slovakia Qualifier	7–8 June 2025	3	Germany; Lithuania; Italy
Romania Qualifier	7–8 June 2025	3	Switzerland; Latvia; Hungary
Kosovo Qualifier	7–8 June 2025	1	Ireland
Total		12	

== Preliminary round ==
The pools were announced on 17 July 2025.

All times are local (UTC+2).

=== Pool A ===
Pos	Team	Pld	W	L	PF	PA	PR	Qualification	SRB	ITA	SUI
1	Serbia	2	2	0	42	32	1.313	Quarterfinals		21–15	21–17
2	Italy	2	1	1	38	41	0.927	Quarterfinals			
3	Switzerland	2	0	2	37	44	0.841			20–23	

Source: FIBA
Rules for classification: 1) Wins; 2) Head-to-head record; 3) Points scored.

5 September 2025
16:00

Boxscore

Switzerland	20–23	Italy
Pts: Lehmann 8		Pts: Gaspardo 10

Ofelia Plads, Copenhagen
Referees: Alex Talisainen, Brigitta Csabai-Kaskötő

5 September 2025
17:50

Boxscore

Serbia	21–15	Italy
Pts: Stojačić 7		Pts: Della Valle 6

Ofelia Plads, Copenhagen
Referees: Brigitta Csabai-Kaskötő, Vlad Ghizdareanu

5 September 2025
19:40

Boxscore

Serbia	21–17	Switzerland
Pts: Branković 11		Pts: Martin 9

Ofelia Plads, Copenhagen
Referees: Najib Chajiddine, Brigitta Csabai-Kaskötő

=== Pool B ===
Pos	Team	Pld	W	L	PF	PA	PR	Qualification	FRA	GER	HUN
1	France	2	2	0	43	32	1.344	Quarterfinals		21–20	22–12
2	Germany	2	1	1	41	34	1.206	Quarterfinals			21–13
3	Hungary	2	0	2	25	43	0.581				

Source: FIBA
Rules for classification: 1) Wins; 2) Head-to-head record; 3) Points scored.

6 September 2025
12:25

Boxscore

France	22–12	Hungary
Pts: Rambaut 8		Pts: Rosic 6

Ofelia Plads, Copenhagen
Referees: Alex Talisainen, Vlad Ghizdareanu

6 September 2025
15:25

Boxscore

Germany	21–13	Hungary
Pts: Agyeman 8		Pts: Molnár 5

Ofelia Plads, Copenhagen
Referees: Vlad Ghizdareanu, Alex Talisainen

6 September 2025
18:25

Boxscore

France	21–20	Germany
Pts: Suhard 8		Pts: Agyeman 8

Ofelia Plads, Copenhagen
Referees: Alex Talisainen, Vlad Ghizdareanu

=== Pool C ===
Pos	Team	Pld	W	L	PF	PA	PR	Qualification	NED	LAT	IRL
1	Netherlands	2	2	0	41	27	1.519	Quarterfinals		20–14	21–13
2	Latvia	2	1	1	35	27	1.296	Quarterfinals			21–7
3	Ireland	2	0	2	20	42	0.476				

Source: FIBA
Rules for classification: 1) Wins; 2) Head-to-head record; 3) Points scored.

5 September 2025
16:50

Boxscore

Latvia	21–7	Ireland
Pts: Kuksiks 11		Pts: Blount 3

Ofelia Plads, Copenhagen
Referees: Vlad Ghizdareanu, Najib Chajiddine

5 September 2025
19:05

Boxscore

Netherlands	21–13	Ireland
Pts: van der Horst 12		Pts: Carroll 4

Ofelia Plads, Copenhagen
Referees: Najib Chajiddine, Alex Talisainen

5 September 2025
20:30

Boxscore

Netherlands	20–14	Latvia
Pts: Alberts 10		Pts: three players 4

Ofelia Plads, Copenhagen
Referees: Alex Talisainen, Vlad Ghizdareanu

=== Pool D ===
Pos	Team	Pld	W	L	PF	PA	PR	Qualification	AUT	LTU	DEN
1	Austria	2	2	0	39	31	1.258	Quarterfinals			18–15
2	Lithuania	2	1	1	37	32	1.156	Quarterfinals	16–21		21–11
3	Denmark (H)	2	0	2	26	39	0.667				

Source: FIBA
Rules for classification: 1) Wins; 2) Head-to-head record; 3) Points scored.
(H) Hosts

6 September 2025
13:25

Boxscore

Lithuania	16–21	Austria
Pts: four players 4		Pts: Kaltenbrunner 8

Ofelia Plads, Copenhagen
Referees: Najib Chajiddine, Brigitta Csabai-Kaskötő

6 September 2025
16:25

Boxscore

Lithuania	21–11	Denmark
Pts: Džiaugys 7		Pts: Christoffersen 4

Ofelia Plads, Copenhagen
Referees: Brigitta Csabai-Kaskötő, Najib Chajiddine

6 September 2025
19:25

Boxscore

Austria	18–15	Denmark
Pts: Murati 8		Pts: Salomon 6

Ofelia Plads, Copenhagen
Referees: Brigitta Csabai-Kaskötő, Najib Chajiddine

== Knockout stage ==
All times are local (UTC+2)

Quarter-finals
7 September – 10:50
Serbia	14
Latvia	20
7 September – 11:15
Austria	13
Germany	21
7 September – 13:25
France	17
Lithuania	21
7 September – 13:50
Netherlands	18
Italy	21

Semi-finals
7 September – 16:00
Latvia	21
Germany	19
7 September – 16:25
Lithuania	21
Italy	15

Final
7 September – 19:25
Latvia	17
Lithuania	21
Third place
7 September – 18:25
Germany	15
Italy	22

=== Quarterfinals ===
7 September 2025
10:50

Boxscore

Serbia	14–20	Latvia
Pts: Barać, Branković 4		Pts: Kuksiks, Miezis 7

Ofelia Plads, Copenhagen
Referees: Alex Talisainen, Najib Chajiddine

7 September 2025
11:15

Boxscore

Austria	13–21	Germany
Pts: Diggs, Murati 5		Pts: Fertig, Giessmann 7

Ofelia Plads, Copenhagen
Referees: Vlad Ghizdareanu, Brigitta Csabai-Kaskötő

7 September 2025
13:25

Boxscore

France	17–21	Lithuania
Pts: Rambaut, Suhard 5		Pts: Džiaugys 9

Ofelia Plads, Copenhagen
Referees: Brigitta Csabai-Kaskötő, Alex Talisainen

7 September 2025
13:50

Boxscore

Netherlands	18–21	Italy
Pts: Alberts 7		Pts: Gaspardo 11

Ofelia Plads, Copenhagen
Referees: Najib Chajiddine, Vlad Ghizdareanu

=== Semifinals ===
7 September 2025
16:00

Boxscore

Latvia	21–19	Germany
Pts: Miezis 9		Pts: Fertig 9

Ofelia Plads, Copenhagen
Referees: Najib Chajiddine, Brigitta Csabai-Kaskötő

7 September 2025
16:25

Boxscore

Lithuania	21–15	Italy
Pts: Pukelis 8		Pts: Della Valle, Gaspardo 5

Ofelia Plads, Copenhagen
Referees: Alex Talisainen, Vlad Ghizdareanu

=== Bronze medal game ===
7 September 2025
18:25

Boxscore

Germany	15–22	Italy
Pts: three players 5		Pts: Gaspardo 13

Ofelia Plads, Copenhagen
Referees: Brigitta Csabai-Kaskötő, Vlad Ghizdareanu

=== Final ===
7 September 2025
19:25

Boxscore

Latvia	17–21	Lithuania
Pts: Miezis 9		Pts: Vaitkus 8

Ofelia Plads, Copenhagen
Referees: Najib Chajiddine, Alex Talisainen

== Final ranking ==
Rank	Team	Record
1st place, gold medalist(s)	Lithuania	4–1
2nd place, silver medalist(s)	Latvia	3–2
3rd place, bronze medalist(s)	Italy	3–2
4	Germany	2–3
5	France	2–1
6	Netherlands	2–1
7	Serbia	2–1
8	Austria	2–1
9	Switzerland	0–2
10	Denmark	0–2
11	Hungary	0–2
12	Ireland	0–2
