= Ireland women's national 3x3 team =

Basketball team in Ireland

Ireland
- FIBA ranking: 34th
- FIBA zone: FIBA Europe
- National federation: Basketball Ireland
- Coach: Niamh Dwyer

FIBA 3x3 World Championships
- Appearances: None

FIBA Europe 3x3 Championships
- Appearances: 2 (2014, 2016)
- Medals: None

The Ireland women's national 3x3 team is a national basketball team of Ireland, administered by Basketball Ireland. It represents the country in international women's 3x3 basketball competitions.

== Squad ==
Squad for FIBA 3x3 Europe Cup Qualifiers in June 2026 in Kosovo

- Claire Melia – (Spain) BAXI Ferrol
- Hazel Finn – (Republic of Ireland) Trinity Meteors
- Maura Fitzpatrick – (Scotland) Caledonia Gladiators
- Abigail Rafferty – (Portugal) GDESSA/Barreiro
