= Estonia women's national 3x3 team =

Estonia women's national 3x3 basketball team

Estonia
- Joined FIBA: 1934; 1991
- FIBA zone: FIBA Europe
- National federation: Estonian Basketball Association

FIBA 3x3 World Cup
- Appearances: 2
- Medals: 0

FIBA 3x3 Europe Cup
- Appearances: ?
- Medals: 0

The Estonia women's national 3x3 team is the 3x3 basketball team representing Estonia in international women's competitions, organized and run by the Estonian Basketball Association.

== Competitive record ==
=== European Games ===
European Games					Qualification		
Year	Position	Pld	W	L	Pld	W	L
(Azerbaijan) 2015	Did not compete						
(Belarus) 2019	2nd place, silver medalist(s)	6	4	2	via FIBA ranking		
Total	1/2	6	4	2			
