= 2018 FIBA 3x3 Europe Cup – Men's tournament =

2018 FIBA 3x3 Europe Cup
Tournament details
- Host country: Romania
- City: Bucharest
- Dates: September 14–16
- Teams: 12
- Venue(s): 1 (in 1 host city)

Final positions
- Champions: Serbia (1st title)
- Runners-up: Latvia
- Third place: Slovenia
- Fourth place: Russia

Tournament statistics
- MVP: (Serbia) Dusan Bulut
- Top scorer: (Latvia) Kārlis Lasmanis (40 points)

The men's tournament of the 2018 FIBA 3x3 Europe Cup hosted in Bucharest, Romania, was contested by 12 teams.
Four-time 3x3 World Champions Serbia won its first ever European 3x3 championship after dethroning defending European 3x3 Champions, Latvia, 19–18 in the final.

== Participating teams ==
The hosts, Romania, qualified for the tournament automatically. The eleven other teams went in their respective qualifiers. FIBA announced the composition of the pools last 16 August 2018.

== Main tournament ==
=== Preliminary round ===
==== Group A ====
| Pos | Team | Pld | W | L | PF | PA | PD | Pts | Qualification | (Serbia) | (Spain) | (Bosnia and Herzegovina) |
|---|---|---|---|---|---|---|---|---|---|---|---|---|
| 1 | Serbia | 2 | 2 | 0 | 40 | 25 | +15 | 4 | Advanced to Knockout stage | — | 20–15 | 20–10 |
| 2 | Spain | 2 | 1 | 1 | 36 | 30 | +6 | 3 | Advanced to Knockout stage | 15–20 | — | 21–10 |
| 3 | Bosnia and Herzegovina | 2 | 0 | 2 | 20 | 41 | −21 | 2 | | 10–20 | 10–21 | — |

Source: FIBA
Rules for classification: 1) Wins; 2) Head-to-head record; 3) Points scored; 4) Higher seed.

==== Group B ====
| Pos | Team | Pld | W | L | PF | PA | PD | Pts | Qualification | (Slovenia) | (France) | (Switzerland) |
|---|---|---|---|---|---|---|---|---|---|---|---|---|
| 1 | Slovenia | 2 | 2 | 0 | 43 | 28 | +15 | 4 | Advanced to Knockout stage | — | 22–12 | 21–16 |
| 2 | France | 2 | 1 | 1 | 33 | 36 | −3 | 3 | Advanced to Knockout stage | 12–22 | — | 21–14 |
| 3 | Switzerland | 2 | 0 | 2 | 30 | 42 | −12 | 2 | | 16–21 | 14–21 | — |

Source: FIBA
Rules for classification: 1) Wins; 2) Head-to-head record; 3) Points scored; 4) Higher seed.

==== Group C ====
| Pos | Team | Pld | W | L | PF | PA | PD | Pts | Qualification | (Latvia) | (Hungary) | (Romania) |
|---|---|---|---|---|---|---|---|---|---|---|---|---|
| 1 | Latvia | 2 | 2 | 0 | 43 | 21 | +22 | 4 | Advanced to Knockout stage | — | 22–11 | 21–10 |
| 2 | Hungary | 2 | 1 | 1 | 30 | 36 | −6 | 3 | Advanced to Knockout stage | 11–22 | — | 19–14 |
| 3 | Romania | 2 | 0 | 2 | 24 | 40 | −16 | 2 | | 10–21 | 14–19 | — |

Source: FIBA
Rules for classification: 1) Wins; 2) Head-to-head record; 3) Points scored; 4) Higher seed.

==== Group D ====
| Pos | Team | Pld | W | L | PF | PA | PD | Pts | Qualification | (Russia) | (Poland) | (Belgium) |
|---|---|---|---|---|---|---|---|---|---|---|---|---|
| 1 | Russia | 2 | 1 | 1 | 36 | 31 | +5 | 3 (Note: Russia wins tiebreaker via point differential.) | Advanced to Knockout stage | — | 21–15 | 15–16 |
| 2 | Poland | 2 | 1 | 1 | 36 | 36 | 0 | 3 | Advanced to Knockout stage | 15–21 | — | 21–15 |
| 3 | Belgium | 2 | 1 | 1 | 31 | 36 | −5 | 3 | | 16–15 | 15–21 | — |

Source: FIBA
Rules for classification: 1) Wins; 2) Head-to-head record; 3) Points scored; 4) Higher seed.

== Knockout stage ==
All times are local.

Quarter-finals
16 Sep 2018 – 13:40
1 Serbia | 19
11 Hungary | 10
16 Sep 2018 – 14:05
4 Russia | 18
7 France | 16
16 Sep 2018 – 15:40
2 Slovenia | 21
5 Poland | 18
16 Sep 2018 – 16:05
3 Latvia | 21
8 Spain | 18

Semi-finals
16 Sep 2018 – 17:40
1 Serbia | 21
4 Russia | 13
16 Sep 2018 – 18:05
2 Slovenia | 20
3 Latvia | 21

Final
16 Sep 2018 – 20:05
1 Serbia | 19
3 Latvia | 18
Bronze medal match
16 Sep 2018 – 19:05
4 Russia | 15
2 Slovenia | 21

== Awards ==
2018 FIBA 3x3 Europe Cup Men's champions

Serbia
1st title

Tournament MVP
(Serbia) Dusan Bulut

Team of the Tournament

- Dusan Bulut ( (Serbia) SRB)
- Kārlis Lasmanis ( (Latvia) LAT)
- Simon Finzgar ( (Slovenia) SLO)

== Final standings ==
| Pos | Team | Pld | W | L | PF |
|---|---|---|---|---|---|
| 1 | Serbia | 5 | 5 | 0 | 99 |
| 2 | Latvia | 5 | 4 | 1 | 103 |
Bronze medal match participants
| 3 | Slovenia | 5 | 4 | 1 | 105 |
| 4 | Russia | 5 | 2 | 3 | 82 |
Eliminated at the quarterfinals
| 5 | Poland | 3 | 1 | 2 | 54 |
| 6 | Spain | 3 | 1 | 2 | 54 |
| 7 | France | 3 | 1 | 2 | 49 |
| 8 | Hungary | 3 | 1 | 2 | 40 |
3rd place in preliminary stage pools
| 9 | Belgium | 2 | 0 | 2 | 31 |
| 10 | Switzerland | 2 | 0 | 2 | 30 |
| 11 | Romania | 2 | 0 | 2 | 24 |
| 12 | Bosnia and Herzegovina | 2 | 0 | 2 | 20 |
