= Hungary women's national 3x3 team =

National 3x3 basketball team

Hungary
- FIBA zone: FIBA Europe

World Cup
- Appearances: 9
- Medals: Silver: (2017, 2019)

Europe Cup
- Appearances: 9
- Medals: Gold: (2016)

The Hungary women's national 3x3 team is a national basketball team of Hungary, administered by the Hungarian Basketball Federation.

It represents the country in international 3x3 (3 against 3) women's basketball competitions.

Cyesha Goree was the second leading scorer at the 2019 World Cup and led her country to the silver medal.

== Competitions ==
=== Summer Olympics ===
Year	Position	Pld	W	L	Players
(Japan) 2020 Tokyo	Did not qualify				
(France) 2024 Paris	Did not qualify				
Total	0/2				

=== World Cup ===
Year	Position	Pld	W	L
(Greece) 2012 Athens	5th	7	5	2
(Russia) 2014 Moscow	22nd	5	0	5
(China) 2016 Guangzhou	6th	5	3	2
(France) 2017 Nantes	2nd	7	5	2
(Philippines) 2018 Bocaue	8th	5	3	2
(Netherlands) 2019 Amsterdam	2nd	7	5	2
(Belgium) 2022 Antwerp	Did not qualify			
(Austria) 2023 Vienna	17th	4	1	3
(Mongolia) 2025 Ulaanbaatar	12th	5	2	3
(Poland) 2026 Warsaw	7th	6	3	3
2027 Singapore	To be determined			
Total	9/11	51	27	24

=== Europe Cup ===
Year	Position	Pld	W	L
(Romania) 2014 Bucharest	Did not qualify			
(Romania) 2016 Bucharest	1st	5	5	0
(Netherlands) 2017 Amsterdam	7th	3	1	2
(Romania) 2018 Bucharest	9th	2	1	1
(Hungary) 2019 Debrecen	5th	3	2	1
(France) 2021 Paris	5th	3	2	1
(Austria) 2022 Graz	Did not qualify			
(Israel) 2023 Jerusalem	11th	2	0	2
(Austria) 2024 Vienna	9th	2	0	2
(Denmark) 2025 Copenhagen	8th	3	1	2
(Belgium) 2026 Antwerp	11th	2	0	2
Total	9/11	25	12	13

== See also ==
- Hungary men's national 3x3 team
- Hungary women's national basketball team
