= Romania women's national 3x3 team =

National 3x3 basketball team

Romania
- FIBA ranking: 8
- Joined FIBA: 1932
- FIBA zone: FIBA Europe
- National federation: FRB

Olympic Games
- Appearances: 1

World Cup
- Appearances: 6

Europe Cup
- Appearances: 5
- Medals: (silver) Silver: 2016
Home	Away

The Romanian women's national 3x3 team represents Romania in international 3x3 basketball matches and is controlled by the Romanian Basketball Federation (Romanian: Federația Română de Baschet).

== Tournament record ==
=== Summer Olympics ===
Year	Position	Pld	W	L
(Japan) 2020 Tokyo	7th	7	1	6
(France) 2024 Paris	Did not qualify			
Total	1/2	6	1	6

=== World Cup ===
Year	Pos	Pld	W	L
(Russia) 2012 Athens	17th	5	2	3
(Greece) 2014 Moscow	7th	7	4	3
(China) 2016 Guangzhou	14th	4	1	3
(France) 2017 Nantes	Did not qualify			
(Philippines) 2018 Bocaue	Did not qualify			
(Netherlands) 2019 Amsterdam	7th	5	3	2
(Belgium) 2022 Antwerp	17th	4	0	4
(Austria) 2023 Vienna	20th	4	0	4
(Mongolia) 2025 Ulaanbaatar	Did not qualify			
(Poland) 2026 Warsaw	To be determined			
2027 Singapore	To be determined			
Total	6/11	29	10	19

=== European Championship ===
Year	Position	Pld	W	L
(Romania) 2014	6th	4	2	2
Total	1/1	4	2	2

== See also ==
- 3x3 basketball
- Romania men's national 3x3 team
