= Turkey men's national 3x3 team =

National 3x3 basketball team

Turkey
- FIBA zone: FIBA Europe
- National federation: TBF
- Coach: ?

World Championships
- Appearances: 4 (2012, 2014)
- Medals: None

European Championships
- Appearances: 1 (2014)
- Medals: None
Home	Away

The Turkey men's national 3x3 team represents Turkey in international 3x3 (3 against 3) basketball competitions organized by FIBA. It is governed by the Turkish Basketball Federation. (Turkish: Türkiye Basketbol Federasyonu, TBF)

== See also ==
- Turkey national basketball team

== Squad ==
- Mehmet Fırat Alemdaroğlu
- Mert Başdan
- Tanalp Şengün
- Utku Saraloğlu

== Participations ==
=== Mediterranean Games ===
Year	Host nation	Rank	Pld	W	L
2018	Spain	13th	3	0	3

== See also ==
Men's

- Turkey Men's national basketball team
- Turkey Men's national basketball team U20
- Turkey Men's national basketball team U18 and U19
- Turkey Men's national basketball team U16 and U17

Women's

- Turkey Women's national basketball team
- Turkey Women's national basketball team U20
- Turkey Women's national basketball team U18 and U19
- Turkey Women's national basketball team U16 and U17
- Turkey Women's national 3x3 team
