= Switzerland women's national 3x3 team =

National 3x3 basketball team

Switzerland
- FIBA zone: FIBA Europe

FIBA 3x3 World Cup
- Appearances: 2 (2014, 2017)
- Medals: None

FIBA Europe 3x3 Championships
- Appearances: 5 (2014, 2016, 2017, 2018, 2019)
- Medals: None

The Switzerland women's national 3x3 team is a national basketball team of Switzerland, governed by the Fédération Suisse de Basketball.

It represents the country in international 3x3 (3 against 3) women's basketball competitions.

Switzerland showed good results in 2019 - firstly at the World Cup where they beat Japan in a thriller, then almost matching it with Australia. In Montreal during the Women's Series 2019, the Swiss finished fourth. To start 2021, the team beat former 3x3 World Champs Russia and finished 4th at the Women's Series in Mies. Marielle Giroud was one of the best rebounders in the game and Evita Herminjard showed improvement as a creator.

== See also ==
- Switzerland women's national basketball team
