= Basketball at the 2023 Pan American Games =

- Basketball pictograms
- Venues: Multisport Complex 1 (5x5); South Sports Centre (3x3)
- Start date: October 22, 2023
- End date: November 4, 2023
- No. of events: 4 (2 men, 2 women)
- Competitors: 256 from 14 nations

Basketball competitions at the 2023 Pan American Games in Santiago, Chile are schedule to take place between October 22 and November 4, 2023, at the Multisport Complex 1 (5x5) and South Sports Centre (3x3) Both venues are located in the National Stadium Park cluster.

A total of eight men's and women's teams will each contest the 5x5 tournaments, meanwhile, 12 teams each will contest the 3x3 tournaments, doubling the size of the fields from 2019.

== Qualification ==
=== Summary ===
NOC	Men		Women		Total
NOC	5-on-5	3x3	5-on-5	3x3	Athletes
Argentina	Yes	Yes	Yes	Yes	32
Brazil	Yes	Yes	Yes	Yes	32
Chile	Yes	Yes	Yes	Yes	32
Colombia			Yes	Yes	16
Cuba			Yes		12
Dominican Republic	Yes	Yes		Yes	20
El Salvador		Yes		Yes	8
Haiti		Yes			4
Jamaica				Yes	4
Mexico	Yes	Yes	Yes	Yes	32
Panama	Yes				12
Puerto Rico	Yes	Yes	Yes	Yes	32
Trinidad and Tobago		Yes			4
United States		Yes		Yes	8
Uruguay		Yes		Yes	8
Venezuela	Yes	Yes	Yes	Yes	32
Total: 16 NOCs	8	12	8	12	288

=== Men's five-a-side ===
Event	Dates	Location	Quota(s)	Qualified
Host Nation	—N/a	—N/a	1	Chile
2022 FIBA AmeriCup	September 2–11	(Brazil) Recife	7	Argentina; Brazil; ~~United States~~; ~~Canada~~; Mexico; Puerto Rico; Venezuela; Dominican Republic; Panama
Total			8	

- USA and Canada withdraw from the tournament.

=== Women's five-a-side ===
Event	Dates	Location	Quota(s)	Qualified
Host Nation	—N/a	—N/a	1	Chile
2023 FIBA Women's AmeriCup	July 1–9	(Mexico) León	7	Brazil; ~~United States~~; ~~Canada~~; Puerto Rico; Colombia; Venezuela; Argentina; Mexico; Cuba
Total			8	

- USA and Canada withdraw from the tournament.

=== Men's 3x3 ===
Event	Dates	Location	Quota(s)	Qualified
Host Nation	—N/a	—N/a	1	Chile
2021 Junior Pan American Games	November 28–30	(Colombia) Cali	1	Puerto Rico
2022 FIBA 3x3 AmeriCup	November 4–6	(United States) Miami	4	United States; Brazil; Trinidad and Tobago; Dominican Republic
FIBA 3x3 Rankings	June 30, 2023	—N/a	6	~~Canada~~; Venezuela; Argentina; El Salvador; Mexico; Uruguay; Haiti
Total			12	

=== Women's 3x3 ===
Event	Dates	Location	Quota(s)	Qualified
Host Nation	—N/a	—N/a	1	Chile
2021 Junior Pan American Games	November 28–30	(Colombia) Cali	1	Colombia
2022 FIBA 3x3 AmeriCup	November 4–6	(United States) Miami	~~4~~ 3	~~Canada~~; Brazil; United States; Jamaica
FIBA 3x3 Rankings	June 30, 2023	—N/a	~~6~~ 7	Puerto Rico; Venezuela; Argentina; Dominican Republic; Uruguay; El Salvador; Mexico
Total			12	

== Medal summary ==
=== Medal table ===
* Host nation (Chile)

Rank	Nation	Gold	Silver	Bronze	Total
1	United States	2	0	0	2
2	Argentina	1	0	1	2
2	Brazil	1	0	1	2
4	Colombia	0	2	0	2
5	Chile*	0	1	1	2
6	Venezuela	0	1	0	1
7	Trinidad and Tobago	0	0	1	1
Totals (7 entries)		4	4	4	12

=== Medalists ===
Event	Gold	Silver	Bronze
Men's tournament	Argentina; Santiago Scala; Pedro Barral; Franco Baralle; Bautista Lugarini; Javier Saiz; Agustín Pérez; Juan Bocca; Lucas Giovannetti; Fabián Ramirez Barrios; Martín Cuello; Tayavek Gallizzi; Kevin Hernández	Venezuela; Edwind Mijares; Kender Urbina; Garly Sojo; Elian Centeno; José Ascanio; Miguel Ruiz; Windi Graterol; Yohanner Sifontes; Franger Pirela; Edgar Martínez; Néstor Colmenares; Enrique Medina	Brazil; Guilherme Pereira; Scott Machado; Felipe Sandoval; Elio Corazza; Didi Louzada; Danilo Fuzaro; Lucas Dias; Márcio Henrique; Wesley Castro; Gabriel Jaú; Reynan dos Santos; Maique Oliveira
Women's tournament	Brazil; Aline Cezário; Gabriella Darrigo; Vanessa Fausto; Débora Costa; Maria Lopes; Mariana Moura; Ana de Oliveira; Emanuely de Oliveira; Licinara Rodrigues; Carina dos Santos; Érika de Souza; Leila Zabani	Colombia; Yanet Arias; Mayra Caicedo; María Delgado; Carolina López; Mabel Martínez; Jenifer Muñoz; Manuela Rios; Isabel Rodríguez; Yuliany Paz; Tania Valencia; Meredith Venner; Marlyn Vente	Argentina; Malvina D'Agostino; Valeria Fernández; Agustina García; Victoria Gauna; Candela Gentinetta; María Jourdheuil; Natassja Kolff; Agustina Marín; Carla Miculka; Delfina Saravia; Camila Suárez; Magali Vilches
Men's 3x3 tournament	United States; Canyon Barry; Jimmer Fredette; Kareem Maddox; Dylan Travis	Chile; Daniel Arcos; Carlos Lauler; Kevin Rubio; Diego Silva	Trinidad and Tobago; Chike Augustine; Ahkeel Boyd; Akheem Boyd; Moriba De Freitas
Women's 3x3 tournament	United States; Cierra Burdick; Blake Dietrick; Lexie Hull; Azurá Stevens	Colombia; Wendy Coy; Carolina López; Valentina López; Jenifer Muñoz	Chile; Jovanka Ljubetic; Ziomara Morrison; Javiera Novión; Fernanda Ovalle

== See also ==
- Wheelchair basketball at the 2023 Parapan American Games
- Basketball at the 2024 Summer Olympics
