= Basketball at the 2023 Pan American Games – Men's 3x3 tournament =

Men's 3x3 basketball at the 2023 Pan American Games
- Venue: South Sports Centre
- Dates: 21–23 October 2023
- Competitors: 48 from 12 nations

Medalists
Gold medal	United States (2nd title)
Silver medal	Chile
Bronze medal	Trinidad and Tobago

The men's 3x3 basketball tournament at the 2023 Pan American Games in Santiago, Chile was held from 21 to 23 October 2023.

== Qualification ==
Event	Dates	Location	Quota(s)	Qualified
Host Nation	—	—	1	Chile
2021 Junior Pan American Games	28–30 November 2021	(Colombia) Cali	1	Puerto Rico
2022 FIBA 3x3 AmeriCup	4–6 November 2022	(United States) Miami	4	United States; Brazil; Trinidad and Tobago; Dominican Republic
FIBA 3x3 Rankings	30 June 2023	—	6	~~Canada~~; Venezuela; Argentina; El Salvador; Mexico; Uruguay; Haiti
Total			12	

== Rosters ==
Team	Players			
Argentina	Juan Fernández	Geronimo Ramallo	Jonathan Ramos	Agustín Wolinsky
Brazil	Leonardo Branquinho	Jonatas de Mello	Jefferson Froehlich	Ruan Marques
Chile	Daniel Arcos	Carlos Lauler	Kevin Rubio	Diego Silva
Dominican Republic	Shamil Ballas	Saúl Mejía	Adonis Nuñez	Cesar Reyes
El Salvador	Emilio Abullarade	Kevin Campos	Pablo Figueroa	William Merino
Haiti	Kervenson Blanc	Ravix Cine	Max Macon	Fitz Salvant
Mexico	Ramon Limas	Julio Ruiz	Diego Sierra	Jose Zesati
Puerto Rico	Leandro Allende	Guillermo Diaz	Jorge Matos	Adrian Ocasio
Trinidad and Tobago	Chike Augustine	Ahkeel Boyd	Ahkeem Boyd	Moriba De Frietas
United States	Canyon Barry	Jimmer Fredette	Kareem Maddox	Dylan Travis
Uruguay	Demian Alvarez	Nicolas Borsellino	Rodrigo Cardozo	Santiago Ramirez
Venezuela	Jose Bracho	Ernesto Hernandez	Nelson Palacios	José Rodriguez

== Preliminary round ==
=== Group A ===
Pos	Team	Pld	W	L	PF	PA	PD	Qualification
1	United States	2	2	0	43	26	+17	Quarterfinals
2	Mexico	2	1	1	40	33	+7	Quarterfinals
3	El Salvador	2	0	2	20	44	−24	

Source: Report
Rules for classification: 1) Wins; 2) Head-to-head record; 3) Points scored.

21 October 2023
15:30

Report

Mexico	22–12	El Salvador
Pts: Ruiz 11		Pts: three players 4

Estadio Español
Referees: Jorge García (MEX) / María Olivieri (ARG)

21 October 2023
19:30

Report

United States	22–8	El Salvador
Pts: Fredette 9		Pts: Merino 7

Estadio Español
Referees: Felipe Valenzuela (CHI) / Ana Zachi (BRA)

22 October 2023
15:00

Report

United States	21–18	Mexico
Pts: Fredette 11		Pts: Zesati 8

Estadio Español
Referees: Lautaro Ojeda (ARG) / Sonia Maldonado (PUR)

=== Group B ===
Pos	Team	Pld	W	L	PF	PA	PD	Qualification
1	Puerto Rico	2	2	0	42	20	+22	Quarterfinals
2	Trinidad and Tobago	2	1	1	28	36	−8	Quarterfinals
3	Dominican Republic	2	0	2	29	43	−14	

Source: Report
Rules for classification: 1) Wins; 2) Head-to-head record; 3) Points scored.

21 October 2023
16:00

Report

Dominican Republic	15–22	Trinidad and Tobago
Pts: Reyes 7		Pts: Ahkeel Boyd 13

Estadio Español
Referees: Nicolas Sarli (URU) / Felipe Valenzuela (CHI)

21 October 2023
20:00

Report

Puerto Rico	21–6	Trinidad and Tobago
Pts: Matos 9		Pts: Ahkeem Boyd 4

Estadio Español
Referees: María Olivieri (ARG) / Yilizeth Vence (COL)

22 October 2023
15:30

Report

Puerto Rico	21–14	Dominican Republic
Pts: Ocasio 8		Pts: Nuñez 8

Estadio Español
Referees: Felipe Valenzuela (CHI) / Marie Houle (CAN)

=== Group C ===
Pos	Team	Pld	W	L	PF	PA	PD	Qualification
1	Chile (H)	2	2	0	44	30	+14	Quarterfinals
2	Uruguay	2	1	1	34	42	−8	Quarterfinals
3	Argentina	2	0	2	37	43	−6	

Source: Report
Rules for classification: 1) Wins; 2) Head-to-head record; 3) Points scored.
(H) Hosts

21 October 2023
16:30

Report

Argentina	20–21	Uruguay
Pts: Ramos 9		Pts: Alvarez 14

Estadio Español
Referees: Sonia Maldonado (PUR) / Yilizeth Vence (COL)

21 October 2023
20:30

Report

Chile	22–13	Uruguay
Pts: Lauler 10		Pts: Alvarez 4

Estadio Español
Referees: Sonia Maldonado (PUR) / Marie Houle (CAN)

22 October 2023
16:00

Report

Chile	22–17	Argentina
Pts: Silva 9		Pts: Ramos 7

Estadio Español
Referees: Jorge Garcia (DOM) / Yilizeth Vence (COL)

=== Group D ===
Pos	Team	Pld	W	L	PF	PA	PD	Qualification
1	Brazil	2	2	0	41	26	+15	Quarterfinals
2	Venezuela	2	1	1	40	36	+4	Quarterfinals
3	Haiti	2	0	2	23	42	−19	

Source: Report
Rules for classification: 1) Wins; 2) Head-to-head record; 3) Points scored.

21 October 2023
15:00

Report

Venezuela	21–16	Haiti
Pts: Palacios 9		Pts: Macon 5

Estadio Español
Referees: Marie Houle (CAN) / Lautaro Ojeda (ARG)

21 October 2023
19:00

Report

Brazil	21–7	Haiti
Pts: Branquinho 12		Pts: Salvant 4

Estadio Español
Referees: Jorge Garcia (DOM) / Lautaro Ojeda (ARG)

22 October 2023
16:30

Report

Brazil	20–19	Venezuela
Pts: de Mello 10		Pts: Palacios 9

Estadio Español
Referees: María Olivieri (ARG) / Felipe Valenzuela (CHI)

== Knockout round ==
=== Bracket ===
Quarterfinals
22 October
United States	21
Uruguay	10
22 October
Brazil	19
Trinidad and Tobago	20
22 October
Puerto Rico	18
Venezuela	21
22 October
Chile	21
Mexico	15

Semifinals
23 October
United States	21
Trinidad and Tobago	9
23 October
Venezuela	20
Chile	22

Gold medal
23 October
United States	21
Chile	15
Bronze medal
23 October
Trinidad and Tobago	21
Venezuela	20

=== Quarterfinals ===
22 October 2023
19:00

Report

United States	21–10	Uruguay
Pts: Fredette 9		Pts: Cardozo 4

Estadio Español
Referees: Felipe Valenzuela (CHI) / Yilizeth Vence (COL)

22 October 2023
19:30

Report

Brazil	19–20	Trinidad and Tobago
Pts: Branquinho 11		Pts: Ahkeel Boyd 11

Estadio Español
Referees: Sonia Maldonado (PUR) / Lautaro Ojeda (ARG)

22 October 2023
20:00

Report

Puerto Rico	18–21	Venezuela
Pts: Matos 9		Pts: Rodriguez 7

Estadio Español
Referees: Felipe Valenzuela (CHI) / Marie Houle (CAN)

22 October 2023
20:30

Report

Chile	21–15	Mexico
Pts: Lauler 8		Pts: Zesati 10

Estadio Español
Referees: Jorge Garcia (DOM) / Sonia Maldonado (PUR)

=== Semifinals ===
23 October 2023
17:00

Report

United States	21–9	Trinidad and Tobago
Pts: Fredette 11		Pts: Ahkeel Boyd 5

Estadio Español
Referees: Felipe Valenzuela (CHI) / Yilizeth Vence (COL)

23 October 2023
17:30

Report

Venezuela	20–22	Chile
Pts: Rodriguez 8		Pts: Rubio 10

Estadio Español
Referees: Sonia Maldonado (PUR) / Jorge Garcia (DOM)

=== Bronze medal game ===
23 October 2023
19:00

Report

Trinidad and Tobago	21–20	Venezuela
Pts: Ahkeel Boyd 12		Pts: Palacios 10

Estadio Español
Referees: Jorge Garcia (DOM) / Yilizeth Vence (COL)

=== Gold medal game ===
23 October 2023
20:00

Report

United States	21–15	Chile
Pts: Barry 8		Pts: Rubio 7

Estadio Español
Referees: Sonia Maldonado (PUR) / Jorge Garcia (DOM)
