= El Salvador men's national 3x3 team =

National 3x3 basketball team

El Salvador
- FIBA zone: FIBA Americas
- National federation: Federación Salvadoreña de Baloncesto

World Cup
- Appearances: 1

AmeriCup
- Appearances: 1

The El Salvador men's national 3x3 team is a national basketball team of El Salvador, administered by the Federación Salvadoreña de Baloncesto. It represents the country in international 3x3 (3 against 3) basketball competitions.

== Tournament record ==
=== World Cup ===
Year	Position	Pld	W	L
(Greece) 2012 Athens	did not qualify			
(Russia) 2014 Moscow	did not qualify			
(China) 2016 Guangzhou	did not qualify			
(France) 2017 Nantes	19th	4	0	4
(Philippines) 2018 Bocaue	did not qualify			
(Netherlands) 2019 Amsterdam	did not qualify			
(Belgium) 2022 Antwerp	did not qualify			
(Austria) 2023 Vienna	did not qualify			
(Mongolia) 2025 Ulaanbaatar	did not qualify			
(Poland) 2026 Warsaw	did not qualify			
2027 Singapore	To be determined			
Total	1/11	4	0	4

=== AmeriCup ===
Year	Position	Pld	W	L
(United States) 2021 Miami	did not qualify			
(United States) 2022 Miami	did not qualify			
(Puerto Rico) 2023 San Juan	did not qualify			
(Puerto Rico) 2024 San Juan	did not qualify			
(Mexico) 2025 León	did not qualify			
(El Salvador) 2026 San Salvador	6th	3	1	2
Total	1/6	3	1	2
