= Chile men's national 3x3 team =

National 3x3 basketball team

Chile
- FIBA ranking: 42
- FIBA zone: FIBA Americas
- National federation: Federación de Básquetbol de Chile

World Cup
- Appearances: 1

AmeriCup
- Appearances: 6
Home	Away

The Chile men's national 3x3 basketball team for men is the basketball side that represents Chile in international 3x3 basketball (3 against 3) competitions. It is organized and run by the Federación de Básquetbol de Chile.

== Tournament record ==
=== World Cup ===
Year	Position	Pld	W	L
(Greece) 2012 Athens	did not qualify			
(Russia) 2014 Moscow	did not qualify			
(China) 2016 Guangzhou	did not qualify			
(France) 2017 Nantes	did not qualify			
(Philippines) 2018 Bocaue	did not qualify			
(Netherlands) 2019 Amsterdam	did not qualify			
(Belgium) 2022 Antwerp	15th	4	1	3
(Austria) 2023 Vienna	did not qualify			
(Mongolia) 2025 Ulaanbaatar	did not qualify			
(Poland) 2026 Warsaw	did not qualify			
2027 Singapore	To be determined			
Total	1/11	4	1	3

=== Summer Olympics ===
Year	Position	Pld	W	L
(Japan) 2020 Tokyo	did not qualify			
(France) 2024 Paris	did not qualify			

=== Pan American Games ===
Year	Position	Pld	W	L
(Peru) 2019 Lima	did not qualify			
(Chile) 2023 Santiago	2nd	5	4	1

=== AmeriCup ===
Year	Position	Pld	W	L
(United States) 2021 Miami	9th	2	0	2
(United States) 2022 Miami	7th	3	1	2
(Puerto Rico) 2023 San Juan	9th	2	1	1
(Puerto Rico) 2024 San Juan	5th	3	2	1
(Mexico) 2025 León	5th	3	1	2
(El Salvador) 2026 Sa Salvador	7th	3	1	2
Total	6/6	16	6	10

== See also ==
- Chile men's national basketball team
