= Basketball at the 2019 Pan American Games – Men's 3x3 tournament =

Men's 3x3 basketball at the 2019 Pan American Games
- Venue: Coliseo Eduardo Dibos
- Dates: 27–29 July 2019
- Competitors: 24 from 6 nations

Medalists
Gold medal	United States (1st title)
Silver medal	Puerto Rico
Bronze medal	Dominican Republic

The men's 3x3 basketball tournament at the 2019 Pan American Games in Lima, Peru was held between 27 and 29 July 2019. It was won by the United States who defeated the Puerto Rico by two points in the final. Dominican Republic got the bronze.

== Qualification ==
Teams were entered based on their FIBA Ranking. Host nation Peru was barred from participating following sanctions imposed on the Peruvian Basketball Federation.

Event	Date	Vacancies	Qualified
Host Nation	—N/a	~~1~~ 0	~~Peru~~
FIBA Rankings	1 November 2018	6	United States; Brazil; Puerto Rico; Argentina; Dominican Republic; Venezuela
Total		6	

== Rosters ==
Team	Players			
Argentina	Luciano Massarelli	Nicolás Romano	Fausto Ruesga	Fernando Zurbriggen
Brazil	Felipe de Camargo	Jonatas de Mello	Jefferson Froehlich	William Weihermann
Dominican Republic	Reyson Beato	Adonis Nuñez	Bryan Piantini	Henry Valdez
Puerto Rico	Gilberto Clavell	Josué Erazo	Tjader Fernández	Ángel Matías
United States	Sheldon Jeter	Dominique Jones	Kareem Maddox	Jonathan Octeus
Venezuela	José Ascanio	Michael Carrera	Edgar Martínez	Yohanner Sifontes

== Results ==
=== Preliminary round ===
Pos	Team	Pld	W	L	PF	PA	PD	Qualification
1	Puerto Rico	5	5	0	104	70	+34	Semifinals
2	Brazil	5	3	2	101	91	+10	Semifinals
3	United States	5	2	3	99	89	+10	Semifinals
4	Dominican Republic	5	2	3	81	98	−17	Semifinals
5	Venezuela	5	2	3	85	104	−19	Fifth place match
6	Argentina	5	1	4	86	104	−18	Fifth place match

Source: Report
Rules for classification: 1) Wins; 2) Head-to-head record; 3) Points scored.

27 July 2019
16:00

Report

United States	21–14	Venezuela
Pts: Jones 12		Pts: Carrera 7

Coliseo Eduardo Dibos
Referees: Ángel Martínez (PUR) / Gonzalo Paz (URU)

27 July 2019
16:30

Report

Brazil	22–13	Dominican Republic
Pts: Weihermann 11		Pts: Beato 10

Coliseo Eduardo Dibos
Referees: Sonia Maldonado (PUR) / Glenn Tuitt (USA)

27 July 2019
17:00

Report

Puerto Rico	21–12	Argentina
Pts: Matías 10		Pts: Romano 8

Coliseo Eduardo Dibos
Referees: Gonzalo Paz (URU) / Glenn Tuitt (USA)

27 July 2019
19:00

Report

Venezuela	21–20	Argentina
Pts: Carrera 12		Pts: Romano 6

Coliseo Eduardo Dibos
Referees: Ángel Martínez (PUR) / Carolina Zachi (BRA)

27 July 2019
19:30

Report

Dominican Republic	12–21	Puerto Rico
Pts: Beato 8		Pts: Fernández 9

Coliseo Eduardo Dibos
Referees: Kayla Herdman (CAN) / Glenn Tuitt (USA)

27 July 2019
20:00

Report

Brazil	20–19	United States
Pts: De Mello 9		Pts: Jones 7

Coliseo Eduardo Dibos
Referees: Sonia Maldonado (PUR) / Gonzalo Paz (URU)

28 July 2019
14:30

Report

Brazil	20–22	Venezuela
Pts: Froehlich 10		Pts: Carrera 14

Coliseo Eduardo Dibos
Referees: Ángel Martínez (PUR) / Glenn Tuitt (USA)

28 July 2019
15:00

Report

Puerto Rico	20–18	United States
Pts: Matías 6		Pts: Octeus 8

Coliseo Eduardo Dibos
Referees: Kayla Herdman (CAN) / Gonzalo Paz (URU)

28 July 2019
15:30

Report

Argentina	16–21	Dominican Republic
Pts: Massarelli 8		Pts: Núñez 11

Coliseo Eduardo Dibos
Referees: Ángel Martínez (PUR) / Carolina Zachi (BRA)

28 July 2019
17:30

Report

Venezuela	18–22	Dominican Republic
Pts: Sifontes, Carrera 7		Pts: Núñez 17

Coliseo Eduardo Dibos
Referees: Gonzalo Paz (URU) / Glenn Tuitt (USA)

28 July 2019
18:00

Report

United States	20–22	Argentina
Pts: Jones 12		Pts: Romano 10

Coliseo Eduardo Dibos
Referees: Sonia Maldonado (PUR) / Ángel Martínez (PUR)

28 July 2019
18:30

Report

Brazil	18–21	Puerto Rico
Pts: De Camargo 6		Pts: Matías 13

Coliseo Eduardo Dibos
Referees: Kayla Herdman (CAN) / Glenn Tuitt (USA)

28 July 2019
20:30

Report

Puerto Rico	21–10	Venezuela
Pts: Fernández, Matías 7		Pts: Martínez 5

Coliseo Eduardo Dibos
Referees: Glenn Tuitt (USA) / Carolina Zachi (BRA)

28 July 2019
21:00

Report

Argentina	16–21	Brazil
Pts: Ruesga 7		Pts: Weihermann 9

Coliseo Eduardo Dibos
Referees: Kayla Herdman (CAN) / Gonzalo Paz (URU)

28 July 2019
21:30

Report

Dominican Republic	13–21	United States
Pts: Beato 7		Pts: Jones 8

Coliseo Eduardo Dibos
Referees: Kayla Herdman (CAN) / Ángel Martínez (PUR)

=== Fifth place match ===
5th place match
5	Venezuela	21
6	Argentina	16

29 July 2019
11:30

Report

Venezuela	21–16	Argentina
Pts: Carrera 11		Pts: Romano 6

Coliseo Eduardo Dibos
Referees: Ángel Martínez (PUR) / Glenn Tuitt (USA)

=== Medal round ===
Semifinals
1	Puerto Rico	21
4	Dominican Republic	8
2	Brazil	12
3	United States	21

Gold medal
1	Puerto Rico	19
3	United States	21
Bronze medal
4	Dominican Republic	19
2	Brazil	17

==== Semifinals ====
29 July 2019
10:00

Report

Puerto Rico	21–8	Dominican Republic
Pts: Fernández 11		Pts: Piantini 4

Coliseo Eduardo Dibos
Referees: Kayla Herdman (CAN) / Glenn Tuitt (USA)

29 July 2019
10:30

Report

Brazil	12–21	United States
Pts: Froehlich 6		Pts: Octeus 8

Coliseo Eduardo Dibos
Referees: Ángel Martínez (PUR) / Gonzalo Paz (URU)

==== Bronze medal match ====
29 July 2019
12:30

Report

Dominican Republic	19–17	Brazil
Pts: Piantini, Núñez 7		Pts: Froehlich 8

Coliseo Eduardo Dibos
Referees: Ángel Martínez (PUR) / Glenn Tuitt (USA)

==== Gold medal match ====
29 July 2019
13:30

Report

Puerto Rico	19–21	United States
Pts: Matías 12		Pts: Octeus, Jeter 8

Coliseo Eduardo Dibos
Referees: Kayla Herdman (CAN) / Gonzalo Paz (URU)
