= 3x3 basketball at the 2018 Central American and Caribbean Games =

Basketball 3x3 at the 2018 Central American and Caribbean Games
- Venue: Plaza de la Paz
- Location: (Colombia) Barranquilla
- Dates: 26–28 July
- Nations: 9
- Teams: 6 (men); 9 (women)

Champions
- Men: Puerto Rico
- Women: Venezuela

Basketball 3x3 at the 2018 Central American and Caribbean Games was held at the Plaza de la Paz in Barranquilla, Colombia from 26 to 28 July.

== Medal summary ==
Event	Gold	Silver	Bronze
Men	Puerto Rico (PUR); Tjader Fernández; Josué Erazo; Ángel Matías; Gilberto Clavell	Dominican Republic (DOM); Adonis Núñez; Esteban Bautista; Reyson Beato; César Reyes	Venezuela (VEN); Lenin López; Juan Coronado; Michaell Flores; Derwin Ramírez
Women	Venezuela (VEN); Odeth Betancourt; Luisanny Zapata; Luisana Ortega; Roselis Silva	Cuba (CUB); María Pérez; Eilen Gilbert; Yusleidy Miranda; Clenia Noblet	Dominican Republic (DOM); Nelsy Sentil; Giocelis Reynoso; Nicole Guerrero; Penélope Poueriet

== Men's tournament ==
=== Group stage ===
Pos	Team	Pld	W	L	PF	PA	PD	Qualification
1	Puerto Rico	5	4 (Note: Puerto Rico 21–13 Venezuela)	1	84	46	+38	Semifinals
2	Venezuela	5	4	1	98	65	+33	Semifinals
3	Dominican Republic	5	3	2	91	76	+15	Semifinals
4	Mexico	5	2 (Note: Mexico 21–12 El Salvador)	3	74	86	−12	Semifinals
5	El Salvador	5	2	3	50	82	−32	
6	Saint Vincent and the Grenadines	5	0	5	63	105	−42	

Source: Barranquilla 2018
Rules for classification: 1) Wins; 2) Head-to-head record; 3) Average points scored.
Notes:

26 July 2018
15:30

Boxscore

Mexico	21–11	Saint Vincent and the Grenadines

26 July 2018
16:00

Boxscore

Puerto Rico	0–W	El Salvador

26 July 2018
17:30

Boxscore

Mexico	21–17	Saint Vincent and the Grenadines

26 July 2018
19:00

Boxscore

Saint Vincent and the Grenadines	18–20 (OT)	El Salvador

26 July 2018
20:30

Boxscore

Mexico	17–21	Dominican Republic

27 July 2018
09:30

Boxscore

Venezuela	13–21	Puerto Rico

27 July 2018
13:30

Boxscore

Saint Vincent and the Grenadines	6–21	Dominican Republic

27 July 2018
14:00

Boxscore

El Salvador	7–21	Venezuela

27 July 2018
16:00

Boxscore

Puerto Rico	21–16	Saint Vincent and the Grenadines

27 July 2018
16:30

Boxscore

El Salvador	12–21	Mexico

27 July 2018
18:30

Boxscore

Venezuela	22–12	Saint Vincent and the Grenadines

27 July 2018
20:30

Boxscore

Dominican Republic	22–11	El Salvador

27 July 2018
21:00

Boxscore

Puerto Rico	21–7	Mexico

28 July 2018
15:30

Boxscore

Mexico	8–21	Venezuela

28 July 2018
16:00

Boxscore

Dominican Republic	10–21	Puerto Rico

=== Knockout stage ===
==== Bracket ====
Semifinals
28 July
Puerto Rico	21
Mexico	10
28 July
Venezuela	20
Dominican Republic	21

Final
28 July
Puerto Rico	21
Dominican Republic	18
Third place
28 July
Mexico	15
Venezuela	21

==== Semifinals ====
28 July 2018
18:00

Boxscore

Puerto Rico	21–10	Mexico

28 July 2018
18:30

Boxscore

Venezuela	20–21	Dominican Republic

==== Third place game ====
28 July 2018
20:00

Boxscore

Mexico	15–21	Venezuela

==== Final ====
28 July 2018
21:00

Boxscore

Puerto Rico	21–18	Dominican Republic

=== Final standings ===
Rank	Team	Record
1st place, gold medalist(s)	Puerto Rico	6–1
2nd place, silver medalist(s)	Dominican Republic	4–3
3rd place, bronze medalist(s)	Venezuela	5–2
4	Mexico	2–5
5	El Salvador	2–3
6	Saint Vincent and the Grenadines	0–5

== Women's tournament ==
=== Group A ===
Pos	Team	Pld	W	L	PF	PA	PD	Qualification
1	Cuba	4	4	0	82	48	+34	Quarterfinals
2	Venezuela	4	3	1	77	51	+26	Quarterfinals
3	El Salvador	4	2	2	52	66	−14	Quarterfinals
4	Guatemala	4	1	3	49	66	−17	Quarterfinals
5	Saint Vincent and the Grenadines	4	0	4	49	78	−29	

Source: Barranquilla 2018
Rules for classification: 1) Wins; 2) Head-to-head record; 3) Average points scored.

26 July 2018
14:30

Boxscore

El Salvador	12–21	Cuba

26 July 2018
15:00

Boxscore

Guatemala	19–12	Saint Vincent and the Grenadines

26 July 2018
17:00

Boxscore

Venezuela	21–7	El Salvador

26 July 2018
18:30

Boxscore

Cuba	21–8	Guatemala

26 July 2018
19:30

Boxscore

Venezuela	21–13	Saint Vincent and the Grenadines

27 July 2018
14:30

Boxscore

Guatemala	10–19	Venezuela

27 July 2018
15:00

Boxscore

Saint Vincent and the Grenadines	12–19	Cuba

27 July 2018
18:00

Boxscore

El Salvador	14–12	Guatemala

27 July 2018
19:30

Boxscore

Cuba	21–16	Venezuela

27 July 2018
20:00

Boxscore

Saint Vincent and the Grenadines	12–19	El Salvador

=== Group B ===
Pos	Team	Pld	W	L	PF	PA	PD	Qualification
1	Dominican Republic	3	3	0	40	24	+16	Quarterfinals
2	Mexico	3	2	1	52	25	+27	Quarterfinals
3	Haiti	3	1	2	7	34	−27	Quarterfinals
4	Puerto Rico	3	0	3	15	31	−16	Quarterfinals

Source: Barranquilla 2018
Rules for classification: 1) Wins; 2) Head-to-head record; 3) Average points scored.

26 July 2018
13:30

Boxscore

Puerto Rico	0–W	Haiti

26 July 2018
14:00

Boxscore

Mexico	12–15	Dominican Republic

26 July 2018
16:30

Boxscore

Dominican Republic	12–4	Haiti

27 July 2018
10:00

Boxscore

Mexico	18–7	Puerto Rico

27 July 2018
15:30

Boxscore

Dominican Republic	13–8	Puerto Rico

27 July 2018
19:00

Boxscore

Haiti	3–22	Mexico

=== Knockout stage ===
==== Bracket ====
Quarterfinals
Cuba	14
Puerto Rico	13
Mexico	8
El Salvador	12
Venezuela	19
Haiti	8
Dominican Republic	16
Guatemala	14

Semifinals
Cuba	19
El Salvador	11
Venezuela	21
Dominican Republic	11

Final
Cuba	16
Venezuela	21
Third place
El Salvador	17
Dominican Republic	19

==== Quarterfinals ====
28 July 2018
13:30

Boxscore

Cuba	14–13	Puerto Rico

28 July 2018
14:00

Boxscore

Mexico	8–12	El Salvador

28 July 2018
14:30

Boxscore

Venezuela	19–8	Haiti

28 July 2018
15:00

Boxscore

Dominican Republic	16–14	Guatemala

==== Semifinals ====
28 July 2018
17:00

Boxscore

Cuba	19–11	El Salvador

28 July 2018
17:30

Boxscore

Venezuela	21–11	Dominican Republic

==== Third place game ====
28 July 2018
19:30

Boxscore

El Salvador	17–19	Dominican Republic

==== Final ====
28 July 2018
20:30

Boxscore

Cuba	16–21	Venezuela

=== Final standings ===
Rank	Team	Record
1st place, gold medalist(s)	Venezuela	6–1
2nd place, silver medalist(s)	Cuba	6–1
3rd place, bronze medalist(s)	Dominican Republic	5–1
4	El Salvador	3–4
5	Mexico	2–2
6	Guatemala	1–4
7	Haiti	1–3
8	Puerto Rico	0–4
9	Saint Vincent and the Grenadines	0–4
