= Venezuela men's national 3x3 team =

National 3x3 basketball team

Venezuela
- FIBA zone: FIBA Americas
- National federation: Federación Venezolana de Baloncesto

World Cup
- Appearances: 2

AmeriCup
- Appearances: 1

The Venezuela men's national 3x3 team is a national basketball team of Venezuela, administered by the Federación Venezolana de Baloncesto.

It represents the country in international 3x3 (3 against 3) basketball competitions. The Venezuela men’s 3x3 team also participates in regional 3x3 competitions such as the FIBA 3x3 AmeriCup, where they have played in qualifying and main draw games against other national sides.

The team competed at the 2019 World Beach Games in Doha, Qatar.

== Tournament record ==
=== World Cup ===
Year	Position	Pld	W	L
(Greece) 2012 Athens	8th	7	3	4
(Russia) 2014 Moscow	22nd	5	0	5
(China) 2016 Guangzhou	did not qualify			
(France) 2017 Nantes	did not qualify			
(Philippines) 2018 Bocaue	did not qualify			
(Netherlands) 2019 Amsterdam	did not qualify			
(Belgium) 2022 Antwerp	did not qualify			
(Austria) 2023 Vienna	did not qualify			
(Mongolia) 2025 Ulaanbaatar	did not qualify			
(Poland) 2026 Warsaw	did not qualify			
2027 Singapore	To be determined			
Total	2/11	12	3	9

=== AmeriCup ===
Year	Position	Pld	W	L
(United States) 2021 Miami	did not qualify			
(United States) 2022 Miami	did not qualify			
(Puerto Rico) 2023 San Juan	did not qualify			
(Puerto Rico) 2024 San Juan	did not qualify			
(Mexico) 2025 León	did not qualify			
(El Salvador) 2026 San Salvador	9th	2	0	2
Total	1/6	2	0	2

== See also ==
- Venezuela women's national 3x3 team
- Venezuela men's national basketball team
