= Canada men's national 3x3 team =

National 3x3 basketball team

Canada
- FIBA ranking: 15
- FIBA zone: FIBA Americas
- National federation: Canada Basketball

FIBA World Cup
- Appearances: 2

FIBA AmeriCup
- Appearances: 6
- Medals: Silver (2026); Bronze (2024)
Medal record
Men's 3x3 basketball
Representing Canada
AmeriCup
Silver medal – second place	2026 San Salvador
Bronze medal – third place	2024 San Juan

The Canada men's national 3x3 team represents Canada in international 3x3 basketball (3 vs 3) competitions. They are overseen by Canada Basketball, the governing body of basketball in Canada.

== History ==
The team competed at the 2021 FIBA 3x3 Olympic Qualifying Tournament hoping to qualify for the 2020 Summer Olympics in Tokyo, Japan. The team was eliminated in the preliminary round.

== Competitive record ==
=== FIBA World Cup ===
Year	Position	Pld	W	L
(Greece) 2012 Athens	Did not qualify			
(Russia) 2014 Moscow	Did not qualify			
(China) 2016 Guangzhou	Did not qualify			
(France) 2017 Nantes	Did not qualify			
(Philippines) 2018 Bocaue	6th	5	4	1
(Netherlands) 2019 Amsterdam	Did not qualify			
(Belgium) 2022 Antwerp	Did not qualify			
(Austria) 2023 Vienna	Did not qualify			
(Mongolia) 2025 Ulaanbaatar	13th	4	1	3
(Poland) 2026 Warsaw	Did not qualify			
2027 Singapore	To be determined			
Total	2/11	9	5	4

=== FIBA AmeriCup ===
Year	Position	Pld	W	L
(United States) 2021 Miami	5th	3	2	1
(United States) 2022 Miami	6th	3	2	1
(Puerto Rico) 2023 San Juan	7th	3	1	2
(Puerto Rico) 2024 San Juan	3rd	5	4	1
(Puerto Rico) 2025 León	4th	5	3	2
(El Salvador) 2026 San Salvador	2nd	5	4	1
Total	6/6	24	16	8
