= Mexico men's national 3x3 team =

Mexican Basketball Team

Mexico
- FIBA zone: FIBA Americas
- National federation: Asociación Deportiva Mexicana de Básquetbol

World Cup
- Appearances: 1

AmeriCup
- Appearances: 6
Home	Away

The Mexico men's national 3x3 team, is controlled by the Asociación Deportiva Mexicana de Baloncesto ADEMEBA (Mexican Basketball Association) and represents Mexico in international 3x3 men's (3 against 3) basketball competitions.

== Tournament record ==
=== World Cup ===
Year	Position	Pld	W	L
(Greece) 2012 Athens	20th	5	1	4
(Russia) 2014 Moscow	did not qualify			
(China) 2016 Guangzhou	did not qualify			
(France) 2017 Nantes	did not qualify			
(Philippines) 2018 Bocaue	did not qualify			
(Netherlands) 2019 Amsterdam	did not qualify			
(Belgium) 2022 Antwerp	did not qualify			
(Austria) 2023 Vienna	did not qualify			
(Mongolia) 2025 Ulaanbaatar	did not qualify			
(Poland) 2026 Warsaw	did not qualify			
2027 Singapore	To be determined			
Total	1/11	5	1	4

=== AmeriCup ===
Year	Position	Pld	W	L
(United States) 2021 Miami	7th	3	1	2
(United States) 2022 Miami	8th	3	1	2
(Puerto Rico) 2023 San Juan	4th	5	2	3
(Puerto Rico) 2024 San Juan	8th	3	1	2
(Mexico) 2025 León	6th	3	1	2
(El Salvador) 2026 San Salvador	8th	3	1	2
Total	6/6	20	7	13

== Youth teams ==
Besides Mexico's senior national 3x3 team, the country features youth 3x3 national teams all the way down to the U12 level.

== See also ==
- Mexico national basketball team
- Mexico women's national 3x3 team
