= Basketball at the 2028 Summer Olympics – Men's 3x3 qualification =

The men's 3×3 qualification for the Olympic basketball tournament will occur between 2027 and 2028, allocating 12 teams for the final tournament.

Five quota places will be awarded to the top-ranked teams, including the host nation United States, based on the total points calculated in the FIBA 3×3 rankings of December 1, 2027, with the remainder attributed to the eligible NOCs in separate wildcard tournaments (two winners of the universality-driven Olympic qualifying tournaments and the top three of the FIBA Olympic Qualifying Tournament).

== Host nation ==
As the host nation, the United States reserves a quota place.

== Qualification via world rankings ==
The highest-ranked team from Europe, Africa, the Americas, and the two highest-ranked Asia-Pacific teams (including at least one Asian team) on the FIBA 3x3 men's basketball ranking list on December 1, 2027, will qualify for the Olympics.

== Qualification via the wild card tournaments ==
The six remaining quota places are attributed to the eligible NOCs, through four separate wildcard tournaments: two universality-driven Olympic qualifying tournaments (UOQT) and the FIBA Olympic qualifying tournament (OQT). Teams will be selected based on the following criteria:

- OQT 1 – The top 12 eligible NOCs, from the FIBA world ranking list, will participate in the first leg of the OQT with the top-two teams obtaining a direct spot for the final tournament. Only NOCs who did not represent 2024 and/or 2024 are eligible to participate.
- OQT 2 – The top 12 eligible NOCs, from the FIBA world ranking list, will participate in the second leg of the OQT with the top-two teams obtaining a direct spot for the final tournament.
- OQS – The winner of the 2026 and 2027 FIBA 3x3 Champions Cup participate alongside the highest-placed NOC of each of 2027 Continental championships for a direct spot for the final tournament.
- OQS – The top eight ranked NOCs will play for a direct spot for the final tournament.

== Qualified teams ==
Qualification method	Date	Venue	Berths	Qualified team
Host nation	—N/a	—N/a	1	United States
FIBA 3×3 World Ranking	December 1, 2027	-	5	
2028 FIBA Universality Olympic Qualifying Tournament 1	March - April 2028	TBA	2	
2028 FIBA Universality Olympic Qualifying Tournament 2	March - April 2028	TBA	2	
Olympic Qualifier Series 1	May 4–7, 2028	(Japan) Tokyo	1	
Olympic Qualifier Series 2	May 11–14, 2028	(China) Shanghai	1	
Total			12	
