= Li Haonan =

Li Haonan may refer to:

- Li Haonan (speed skater)
- Li Haonan (basketball)
