= 2026 FIBA 3x3 World Cup – Qualifier =

Tournament details
- Host country: Singapore
- City: Singapore
- Dates: 11–12 April
- Teams: 12
- Venue: 1

The 2026 FIBA 3x3 World Cup – Qualifier determined the three teams per gender to qualify for the 2026 FIBA 3x3 World Cup. The event was held in Singapore from 11 to 12 April 2026.

== Men's tournament ==
Men's tournament
Tournament details
- Teams: 6

=== Teams ===
- Czech Republic
- New Zealand
- Italy
- Singapore
- Brazil
- Egypt

=== Preliminary round ===
The pools were announced on 3 March 2026.

==== Pool A ====
Pos	Team	Pld	W	L	PF	PA	PR	Qualification	BRA	CZE	SGP
1	Brazil	2	2	0	41	26	1.577	Semifinals			
2	Czech Republic	2	1	1	35	32	1.094	Semifinals	15–22		20–10
3	Singapore (H)	2	0	2	21	39	0.538		11–19		

Source: FIBA
Rules for classification: 1) Wins; 2) Head-to-head record; 3) Points scored.
(H) Hosts

==== Pool B ====
Pos	Team	Pld	W	L	PF	PA	PR	Qualification	ITA	NZL	EGY
1	Italy	2	2	0	38	31	1.226	Semifinals			21–19
2	New Zealand	2	1	1	28	32	0.875	Semifinals	12–17		16–15
3	Egypt	2	0	2	34	37	0.919				

Source: FIBA
Rules for classification: 1) Wins; 2) Head-to-head record; 3) Points scored.

=== Knockout stage ===
The semifinal winners are qualified for the World Cup, the losers play a last game to determine the last team.

Semi-finals
12 April
Brazil	17
New Zealand (OT)	19
12 April
Italy	16
Czech Republic	20

Losers final
12 April
Brazil	21
Italy	13

=== Final ranking ===
Rank	Team	Record
1st place, gold medalist(s)	New Zealand	2–1
2nd place, silver medalist(s)	Czech Republic	2–1
3rd place, bronze medalist(s)	Brazil	3–1
4	Italy	2–2
5	Egypt	0–2
6	Singapore	0–2

Qualified for the 2026 FIBA 3x3 World Cup

== Women's tournament ==
Women's tournament
Tournament details
- Teams: 6

=== Teams ===
- Brazil
- Egypt
- Hungary
- Lithuania
- Philippines
- Singapore

=== Preliminary round ===
The pools were announced on 3 March 2026.

==== Pool A ====
Pos	Team	Pld	W	L	PF	PA	PR	Qualification	HUN	LTU	EGY
1	Hungary	2	2	0	37	33	1.121	Semifinals		16–15 (OT)	21–18
2	Lithuania	2	1	1	34	34	1.000	Semifinals			19–18
3	Egypt	2	0	2	36	40	0.900				

Source: FIBA
Rules for classification: 1) Wins; 2) Head-to-head record; 3) Points scored.

==== Pool B ====
Pos	Team	Pld	W	L	PF	PA	PR	Qualification	PHI	SGP	BRA
1	Philippines	2	1	1	34	35	0.971	Semifinals		21–19	13–16
2	Singapore (H)	2	1	1	34	34	1.000	Semifinals			15–13 (OT)
3	Brazil	2	1	1	29	28	1.036				

Source: FIBA
Rules for classification: 1) Wins; 2) Head-to-head record; 3) Points scored.
(H) Hosts

=== Knockout stage ===
The semifinal winners are qualified for the World Cup, the losers play a last game to determine the last team.

Semi-finals
12 April
Hungary	21
Singapore	13
12 April
Philippines	16
Lithuania	21

Losers final
12 April
Singapore	10
Philippines	21

=== Final ranking ===
Rank	Team	Record
1st place, gold medalist(s)	Hungary	3–0
2nd place, silver medalist(s)	Lithuania	2–1
3rd place, bronze medalist(s)	Philippines	2–2
4	Singapore	1–3
5	Brazil	1–1
6	Egypt	0–2

Qualified for the 2026 FIBA 3x3 World Cup
