= 2026 FIBA 3x3 AmeriCup – Men's tournament =

Tournament details
- Host country: El Salvador
- City: San Salvador
- Dates: 28 October – 1 November
- Teams: 24
- Venue: 1

Final positions
- Champions: United States (5th title)
- Runners-up: Canada
- Third place: Puerto Rico
- Fourth place: Brazil

Tournament statistics
- MVP: (United States) Jimmer Fredette

The 2026 FIBA 3x3 AmeriCup – Men's tournament was the sixth edition of the FIBA 3x3 AmeriCup, the annual international 3x3 basketball championship organised under the auspices of FIBA Americas for women's national teams in the Americas.

The tournament took place in El Salvador from 28 October to 1 November 2026, marking the first time the country hosted the event and first time it was in Central America.

The United States were the two-time defending champions and won their overall fifth title, beating Canada in the final.

== Host selection ==
On 23 February 2026, El Salvador was given the hosting rights for the 2026 and 2027 rights. This will be the first time the tournament will be in the country and the first time it will be in Central America.

== Qualifying draw ==
The group winners qualified for the next round.

=== Pool QD A ===
Pos	Team	Pld	W	L	PF	PA	PD	Qualification	(Dominican Republic)	(Belize)	(Guatemala)	(Colombia)
1	Dominican Republic	3	2	1	58	44	+14	Preliminary round		21–15		21–8
2	Belize	3	2	1	56	46	+10				20–15	
3	Guatemala	3	2	1	56	49	+7		21–16			
4	Colombia	3	0	3	31	62	−31			10–21	13–20	

Source: FIBA
Legend: Blue = home team win; Red = away team win.
Rules for classification: 1) Wins; 2) Head-to-head record; 3) Points scored.

=== Pool QD B ===
Pos	Team	Pld	W	L	PF	PA	PD	Qualification	(Venezuela)	(Nicaragua)	(Saint Kitts and Nevis)	(Haiti)
1	Venezuela	3	3	0	63	41	+22	Preliminary round		21–15		21–11
2	Nicaragua	3	1	2	51	57	−6				17–15	
3	Saint Kitts and Nevis	3	1	2	48	52	−4		15–21			
4	Haiti	3	1	2	46	58	−12			21–19	14–18	

Source: FIBA
Legend: Blue = home team win; Red = away team win.
Rules for classification: 1) Wins; 2) Head-to-head record; 3) Points scored.

=== Pool QD C ===
Pos	Team	Pld	W	L	PF	PA	PD	Qualification	(Trinidad and Tobago)	(Honduras)	(Saint Lucia)	(Cayman Islands)
1	Trinidad and Tobago	3	2	1	56	43	+13	Preliminary round		21–14	14–17	
2	Honduras	3	2	1	52	50	+2				18–17	
3	Saint Lucia	3	2	1	51	48	+3					17–16
4	Cayman Islands	3	0	3	40	58	−18		12–21	12–20		

Source: FIBA
Legend: Blue = home team win; Red = away team win.
Rules for classification: 1) Wins; 2) Head-to-head record; 3) Points scored.

=== Pool QD D ===
Pos	Team	Pld	W	L	PF	PA	PD	Qualification	(Suriname)	(Uruguay)	(Jamaica)	(Barbados)
1	Suriname	3	3	0	59	48	+11	Preliminary round			21–19	
2	Uruguay	3	2	1	53	44	+9		15–20			21–9
3	Jamaica	3	1	2	54	53	+1			15–17		20–15
4	Barbados	3	0	3	38	59	−21		14–18			

Source: FIBA
Legend: Blue = home team win; Red = away team win.
Rules for classification: 1) Wins; 2) Head-to-head record; 3) Points scored.

== Preliminary round ==
=== Pool A ===
Pos	Team	Pld	W	L	PF	PA	PD	Qualification	(United States)	(El Salvador)	(Dominican Republic)
1	United States	2	2	0	43	19	+24	Knockout stage		21–12	22–7
2	El Salvador (H)	2	1	1	33	40	−7	Knockout stage			21–19
3	Dominican Republic	2	0	2	26	43	−17				

Source: FIBA
Legend: Blue = home team win; Red = away team win.
Rules for classification: 1) Wins; 2) Head-to-head record; 3) Points scored.
(H) Hosts

=== Pool B ===
Pos	Team	Pld	W	L	PF	PA	PD	Qualification	(Puerto Rico)	(Brazil)	(Venezuela)
1	Puerto Rico	2	2	0	42	30	+12	Knockout stage		21–13	21–17
2	Brazil	2	1	1	30	37	−7	Knockout stage			17–16
3	Venezuela	2	0	2	33	38	−5				

Source: FIBA
Legend: Blue = home team win; Red = away team win.
Rules for classification: 1) Wins; 2) Head-to-head record; 3) Points scored.

=== Pool C ===
Pos	Team	Pld	W	L	PF	PA	PD	Qualification	(Canada)	(Mexico)	(Trinidad and Tobago)
1	Canada	2	2	0	42	21	+21	Knockout stage		21–13	21–8
2	Mexico	2	1	1	34	30	+4	Knockout stage			21–9
3	Trinidad and Tobago	2	0	2	17	42	−25				

Source: FIBA
Legend: Blue = home team win; Red = away team win.
Rules for classification: 1) Wins; 2) Head-to-head record; 3) Points scored.

=== Pool D ===
Pos	Team	Pld	W	L	PF	PA	PD	Qualification	(Argentina)	(Chile)	(Suriname)
1	Argentina	2	2	0	40	29	+11	Knockout stage			20–10
2	Chile	2	1	1	41	32	+9	Knockout stage	19–20		22–12
3	Suriname	2	0	2	22	42	−20				

Source: FIBA
Legend: Blue = home team win; Red = away team win.
Rules for classification: 1) Wins; 2) Head-to-head record; 3) Points scored.

== Knockout stage ==
Quarter-finals
1 November
United States	21
Mexico	16
1 November
Argentina	15
Brazil	22
1 November
Puerto Rico	20
Chile	10
1 November
Canada	21
El Salvador	18

Semi-finals
1 November
United States	17
Brazil	13
1 November
Puerto Rico	18
Canada	21

Final
1 November
United States	21
Canada	15
Third place
1 November
Brazil	17
Puerto Rico	19

== Final ranking ==
Rank	Team	Record
1st place, gold medalist(s)	United States	5–0
2nd place, silver medalist(s)	Canada	4–1
3rd place, bronze medalist(s)	Puerto Rico	4–1
4	Brazil	2–3
5	Argentina	2–1
6	El Salvador	1–2
7	Chile	1–2
8	Mexico	1–2
9	Venezuela	0–2
10	Dominican Republic	0–2
11	Suriname	0–2
12	Trinidad and Tobago	0–2
Eliminated in qualifying draw
13	Guatemala	2–1
14	Belize	2–1
15	Uruguay	2–1
16	Honduras	2–1
17	Saint Lucia	2–1
18	Jamaica	1–2
19	Nicaragua	1–2
20	Saint Kitts and Nevis	1–2
21	Haiti	1–2
22	Cayman Islands	0–3
23	Barbados	0–3
24	Colombia	0–3
