= 2021 FIBA 3x3 AmeriCup =

Tournament details
- Host country: United States
- City: Miami, Florida
- Dates: November 12–14, 2021
- Teams: 29 (men:16, women:13)
- Venue: Bayfront Park

Final positions
- Champions: United States (men); United States (women)

The 2021 FIBA 3x3 AmeriCup was the inaugural edition of the FIBA 3x3 Americup. It was the first-ever national team competition for 3x3 in the Americas. The games were held from November 12 to November 14 in Miami, United States. Sixteen men's teams and 13 women's teams participated in the event celebrated at the Bayfront Park in Downtown Miami.

== Participating teams ==
The winners from qualifying draw A and B is included in the Pools C and D, respectively. Numbers in the parentheses are seeds.

=== Men's ===
Pool A

- United States (1)
- Mexico (8)
- Uruguay (9)

Pool B

- Canada (2)
- Argentina (7)
- Saint Lucia (12)

Pool C

- Brazil (3)
- Chile (6)

Qualifying Draw A

- Haiti (13)
- Jamaica (14)
- Aruba (15)

Pool D

- Dominican Republic (4)
- Puerto Rico (5)

Qualifying Draw B

- Guatemala (10)
- Trinidad and Tobago (11)
- Guyana (16)

=== Women's ===
Pool A

- Canada (1)
- Uruguay (8)
- Puerto Rico (9)

Pool B

- United States (2)
- Argentina (7)
- Trinidad and Tobago (10)

Pool C

- Chile (3)
- Mexico (6)

Qualifying Draw A

- Guatemala (11)
- Jamaica (12)
- Guyana (13)

Pool D

- Brazil (4)
- Dominican Republic (5)

== Format ==
Preliminary round is played as a round-robin format and top two teams from each pool advance to the quarterfinal.

== Men's tournament ==
=== Qualifying draw ===
==== Draw A ====
Pos	Team	Pld	W	L	PF	PA	PD	PCT	Qualification	(Jamaica)	(Haiti)	(Aruba)
1	Jamaica	2	2	0	43	22	+21	1.000	Pool stage	—	21–11	22–11
2	Haiti	2	1	1	32	40	−8	.500			—	21–19
3	Aruba	2	0	2	30	43	−13	.000				—

Source: FIBA
Rules for classification: 1) Wins; 2) Head-to-head record; 3) Points scored; 4) Higher seed.

==== Draw B ====
Pos	Team	Pld	W	L	PF	PA	PD	PCT	Qualification	(Guatemala)	(Trinidad and Tobago)	(Guyana)
1	Guatemala	2	1	1	39	33	+6	.500	Pool stage	—	21–14	18–19
2	Trinidad and Tobago	2	1	1	35	34	+1	.500			—	21–13
3	Guyana	2	1	1	32	39	−7	.500				—

Source: FIBA
Rules for classification: 1) Wins; 2) Head-to-head record; 3) Points scored; 4) Higher seed.

=== Pool stage ===
==== Pool A ====
Pos	Team	Pld	W	L	PF	PA	PD	PCT	Qualification	(United States)	(Mexico)	(Uruguay)
1	United States	2	2	0	44	26	+18	1.000	Knockout stage	—	22–12	22–14
2	Mexico	2	1	1	34	32	+2	.500	Knockout stage		—	22–10
3	Uruguay	2	0	2	24	44	−20	.000				—

Source: FIBA
Rules for classification: 1) Wins; 2) Head-to-head record; 3) Points scored; 4) Higher seed.

==== Pool B ====
Pos	Team	Pld	W	L	PF	PA	PD	PCT	Qualification	(Canada)	(Saint Lucia)	(Argentina)
1	Canada	2	2	0	43	11	+32	1.000	Knockout stage	—	22–4	21–7
2	Saint Lucia	2	1	1	22	39	−17	.500	Knockout stage		—	18–17
3	Argentina	2	0	2	24	39	−15	.000				—

Source: FIBA
Rules for classification: 1) Wins; 2) Head-to-head record; 3) Points scored; 4) Higher seed.

==== Pool C ====
Pos	Team	Pld	W	L	PF	PA	PD	PCT	Qualification	(Brazil)	(Jamaica)	(Chile)
1	Brazil	2	2	0	42	27	+15	1.000	Knockout stage	—	20–15	22–12
2	Jamaica	2	1	1	36	34	+2	.500	Knockout stage		—	21–14
3	Chile	2	0	2	26	43	−17	.000				—

Source: FIBA
Rules for classification: 1) Wins; 2) Head-to-head record; 3) Points scored; 4) Higher seed.

==== Pool D ====
Pos	Team	Pld	W	L	PF	PA	PD	PCT	Qualification	(Puerto Rico)	(Dominican Republic)	(Guatemala)
1	Puerto Rico	2	2	0	43	34	+9	1.000	Knockout stage	—	21–20	22–14
2	Dominican Republic	2	1	1	41	25	+16	.500	Knockout stage		—	21–4
3	Guatemala	2	0	2	18	43	−25	.000				—

Source: FIBA
Rules for classification: 1) Wins; 2) Head-to-head record; 3) Points scored; 4) Higher seed.

=== Knockout stage ===
All times are local.

Quarter-finals
14 Nov 2021 – 10:50
United States	22
Jamaica	17
14 Nov 2021 – 11:15
Puerto Rico	21
Saint Lucia	19
14 Nov 2021 – 12:50
Canada	17
Dominican Republic	21
14 Nov 2021 – 13:15
Brazil	20
Mexico	13

Semi-finals
14 Nov 2021 – 14:50
United States	21
Puerto Rico	17
14 Nov 2021 – 15:15
Dominican Republic	15
Brazil	20

Final
14 Nov 2021 – 17:15
United States	21
Brazil	15
Bronze medal
14 Nov 2021 – 16:15
Puerto Rico	20
Dominican Republic	21

=== Final standings ===
Pos	Team	Pld	W	L	PF
1st place, gold medalist(s)	United States	5	5	0	108
2nd place, silver medalist(s)	Brazil	5	4	1	97
3rd place, bronze medalist(s)	Dominican Republic	5	3	2	98
4	Puerto Rico	5	3	2	101
5	Canada	3	2	1	60
6	Jamaica	5	3	2	96
7	Mexico	3	1	2	47
8	Saint Lucia	3	1	2	41
9	Chile	2	0	2	26
10	Uruguay	2	0	2	24
11	Argentina	2	0	2	24
12	Guatemala	4	1	3	57
13	Trinidad and Tobago	2	1	1	35
14	Haiti	2	1	1	32
15	Guyana	2	1	1	32
16	Aruba	2	0	2	30

== Women's tournament ==
=== Qualifying draw ===
Pos	Team	Pld	W	L	PF	PA	PD	PCT	Qualification	(Guyana)	(Guatemala)	(Jamaica)
1	Guyana	2	1	1	36	36	0	.500	Pool stage	—		
2	Guatemala	2	1	1	35	33	+2	.500	Pool stage	16–20	—	19–13
3	Jamaica	2	1	1	33	35	−2	.500		20–16		—

Source: FIBA
Rules for classification: 1) Wins; 2) Head-to-head record; 3) Points scored; 4) Higher seed.

=== Pool stage ===
==== Pool A ====
Pos	Team	Pld	W	L	PF	PA	PD	PCT	Qualification	(Canada)	(Puerto Rico)	(Uruguay)
1	Canada	2	2	0	41	10	+31	1.000	Knockout stage	—	19–7	22–3
2	Puerto Rico	2	1	1	27	31	−4	.500	Knockout stage		—	20–12
3	Uruguay	2	0	2	15	42	−27	.000				—

Source: FIBA
Rules for classification: 1) Wins; 2) Head-to-head record; 3) Points scored; 4) Higher seed.

==== Pool B ====
Pos	Team	Pld	W	L	PF	PA	PD	PCT	Qualification	(United States)	(Argentina)	(Trinidad and Tobago)
1	United States	2	2	0	44	4	+40	1.000	Knockout stage	—	22–2	22–2
2	Argentina	2	1	1	17	28	−11	.500	Knockout stage		—	15–6
3	Trinidad and Tobago	2	0	2	8	37	−29	.000				—

Source: FIBA
Rules for classification: 1) Wins; 2) Head-to-head record; 3) Points scored; 4) Higher seed.

==== Pool C ====
Pos	Team	Pld	W	L	PF	PA	PD	PCT	Qualification	(Chile)	(Mexico)	(Guyana)
1	Chile	2	2	0	36	24	+12	1.000	Knockout stage	—	18–11	18–13
2	Mexico	2	1	1	28	29	−1	.500	Knockout stage		—	17–11
3	Guyana	2	0	2	24	35	−11	.000				—

Source: FIBA
Rules for classification: 1) Wins; 2) Head-to-head record; 3) Points scored; 4) Higher seed.

==== Pool D ====
Pos	Team	Pld	W	L	PF	PA	PD	PCT	Qualification	(Brazil)	(Dominican Republic)	(Guatemala)
1	Brazil	2	2	0	42	26	+16	1.000	Knockout stage	—	21–14	21–12
2	Dominican Republic	2	1	1	35	29	+6	.500	Knockout stage		—	21–8
3	Guatemala	2	0	2	20	42	−22	.000				—

Source: FIBA
Rules for classification: 1) Wins; 2) Head-to-head record; 3) Points scored; 4) Higher seed.

=== Knockout stage ===
All times are local.

Quarter-finals
14 Nov 2021 – 10:00
Canada	20
Mexico	6
14 Nov 2021 – 10:25
Brazil	21
Argentina	8
14 Nov 2021 – 12:00
United States	21
Dominican Republic	7
14 Nov 2021 – 12:25
Chile	13
Puerto Rico	15

Semi-finals
14 Nov 2021 – 13:50
Canada	13
Brazil	20
14 Nov 2021 – 14:15
United States	21
Puerto Rico	11

Final
14 Nov 2021 – 16:50
Brazil	9
United States	21
Bronze medal
14 Nov 2021 – 15:50
Canada	18
Puerto Rico	12

=== Final standings ===
Pos	Team	Pld	W	L	PF
1st place, gold medalist(s)	United States	5	5	0	107
2nd place, silver medalist(s)	Brazil	5	4	1	92
3rd place, bronze medalist(s)	Canada	5	4	1	92
4	Puerto Rico	5	2	3	65
5	Chile	3	2	1	49
6	Dominican Republic	3	1	2	42
7	Mexico	3	1	2	34
8	Argentina	3	1	2	25
9	Guyana	4	1	3	60
10	Guatemala	4	1	3	55
11	Uruguay	2	0	2	15
12	Trinidad and Tobago	2	0	2	8
13	Jamaica	2	1	1	33

== See also ==
- 3x3 basketball
- FIBA 3x3 World Cup
- Basketball at the 2024 Summer Olympics
- 2022 FIBA 3x3 AmeriCup
