= Argentina men's national 3x3 team =

National 3x3 basketball team

Argentina
- FIBA zone: FIBA Americas
- National federation: Confederación Argentina de Basquetbol

FIBA 3x3 World Cup
- Appearances: 2

AmeriCup
- Appearances: 6

The Argentina men's national 3x3 team is a national basketball team of Argentina, governed by the Confederación Argentina de Basquetbol. It represents the country in international 3x3 (3 against 3) basketball competitions.

== Tournament record ==
=== World Cup ===
Year	Pos	Pld	W	L
(Greece) 2012	12th	6	3	3
(Russia) 2014	18th	5	2	3
(China) 2016	Did not enter			
(France) 2017	Did not enter			
(Philippines) 2018	Did not enter			
(Netherlands) 2019	Did not enter			
(Belgium) 2022	Did not enter			
(Austria) 2023	Did not enter			
(Mongolia) 2025	Did not enter			
(Poland) 2026	Did not enter			
(Singapore) 2027	To be determined			

=== AmeriCup ===
Year	Position	Pld	W	L
(United States) 2021 Miami	11th	2	0	2
(United States) 2022 Miami	9	2	0	2
(Puerto Rico) 2023 San Juan	8	3	1	2
(Puerto Rico) 2024 San Juan	9	2	0	2
(Mexico) 2025 León	7th	3	1	2
(El Salvador) 2026 San Salvador	5th	3	2	1
Total	5/5	15	4	11

== See also ==
- Argentina women's national 3x3 team
- Argentina mixed national 3x3 team
- Argentina national basketball team
