= 2024 FIBA 3x3 AmeriCup – Men's tournament =

Tournament details
- Host country: Puerto Rico
- City: San Juan
- Dates: 13–15 December
- Teams: 19
- Venue(s): Distrito T-Mobile

Final positions
- Champions: United States (3rd title)
- Runners-up: Puerto Rico
- Third place: Canada
- Fourth place: Dominican Republic

Tournament statistics
- MVP: (United States) Henry Caruso

The 2024 FIBA 3x3 AmeriCup – Men's tournament is the fourth edition of this continental championship. The event was held in San Juan, Puerto Rico for the second consecutive time. It was contested by 19 teams from all over the American continent.

The United States won their third title, after defeating hosts Puerto Rico 21–18 in the final.

== Host selection ==
Puerto Rico's capital, San Juan, was given the hosting rights on 14 January 2024 after the director of the Puerto Rican 3x3 program renewed the contract after a successful 2023 edition. This marks the second straight time that Puerto Rico is hosting the event.

== Venue ==
The venue is the Distrito T-Mobile in San Juan.

== Participating teams ==
All National Federations in the Americas region were invited to register a team for the 2024 FIBA 3x3 AmeriCup.

Preliminary round

Pool A

- United States (1)
- Mexico (8)
- Uruguay (9)

Pool B

- Puerto Rico (2)
- Dominican Republic (7)
- Qualifier

Pool C

- Canada (3)
- Argentina (6)
- Qualifier

Pool D

- Chile (4)
- Brazil (5)
- Qualifier

Qualifying draw

Pool A

- Haiti (10)
- Cayman Islands (15)
- Guyana (16)

Pool B

- Jamaica (11)
- Trinidad and Tobago (14)
- Cuba (17)
- Saint Kitts and Nevis (19)

Pool C

- Saint Lucia (12)
- Colombia (13)
- Guatemala (18)

== Qualifying draw ==
The three group winners qualifies for the next round.

=== Pool A ===
Pos	Team	Pld	W	L	PF	PA	PD	Qualification	(Haiti)	(Cayman Islands)	(Guyana)
1	Haiti	2	2	0	31	24	+7	Preliminary round		14–9	17–15
2	Cayman Islands	2	1	1	30	31	−1				21–17
3	Guyana	2	0	2	32	38	−6				

Source: FIBA
Rules for classification: 1) Wins; 2) Head-to-head record; 3) Points scored.

=== Pool B ===
Pos	Team	Pld	W	L	PF	PA	PD	Qualification	(Jamaica)	(Trinidad and Tobago)	(Cuba)	(Saint Kitts and Nevis)
1	Jamaica	3	3	0	63	28	+35	Preliminary round		21–17		21–7
2	Trinidad and Tobago	3	2	1	59	44	+15				21–9	21–14
3	Cuba	3	1	2	29	59	−30		4–22			
4	Saint Kitts and Nevis	3	0	3	32	58	−26				11–16	

Source: FIBA
Rules for classification: 1) Wins; 2) Head-to-head record; 3) Points scored.

=== Pool C ===
Pos	Team	Pld	W	L	PF	PA	PD	Qualification	(Colombia)	(Guatemala)	(Saint Lucia)
1	Colombia	2	2	0	36	23	+13	Preliminary round		22–11	
2	Guatemala	2	1	1	30	35	−5				
3	Saint Lucia	2	0	2	25	34	−9		12–15	13–19	

Source: FIBA
Rules for classification: 1) Wins; 2) Head-to-head record; 3) Points scored.

== Preliminary round ==
=== Pool A ===
Pos	Team	Pld	W	L	PF	PA	PD	Qualification	(United States)	(Mexico)	(Uruguay)
1	United States	2	2	0	41	20	+21	Quarter-finals		20–13	21–7
2	Mexico	2	1	1	34	33	+1	Quarter-finals			22–13
3	Uruguay	2	0	2	20	43	−23				

Source: FIBA
Rules for classification: 1) Wins; 2) Head-to-head record; 3) Points scored.

=== Pool B ===
Pos	Team	Pld	W	L	PF	PA	PD	Qualification	(Puerto Rico)	(Dominican Republic)	(Haiti)
1	Puerto Rico (H)	2	2	0	40	27	+13	Quarter-finals		21–14	19–13
2	Dominican Republic	2	1	1	32	33	−1	Quarter-finals			18–12
3	Haiti	2	0	2	25	37	−12				

Source: FIBA
Rules for classification: 1) Wins; 2) Head-to-head record; 3) Points scored.
(H) Hosts

=== Pool C ===
Pos	Team	Pld	W	L	PF	PA	PD	Qualification	(Canada)	(Jamaica)	(Argentina)
1	Canada	2	2	0	40	25	+15	Quarter-finals		19–14	21–11
2	Jamaica	2	1	1	35	33	+2	Quarter-finals			
3	Argentina	2	0	2	25	42	−17			14–21	

Source: FIBA
Rules for classification: 1) Wins; 2) Head-to-head record; 3) Points scored.

=== Pool D ===
Pos	Team	Pld	W	L	PF	PA	PD	Qualification	(Chile)	(Brazil)	(Colombia)
1	Chile	2	2	0	33	28	+5	Quarter-finals		18–15	15–13
2	Brazil	2	1	1	36	25	+11	Quarter-finals			21–7
3	Colombia	2	0	2	20	36	−16				

Source: FIBA
Rules for classification: 1) Wins; 2) Head-to-head record; 3) Points scored.

== Knockout stage ==
Quarter-finals
15 Dec 2023
United States	21
Jamaica	14
15 Dec 2023
Chile	9
Dominican Republic	18
15 Dec 2023
Puerto Rico	21
Brazil	16
15 Dec 2023
Canada	21
Mexico	14

Semi-finals
15 Dec 2023
United States	21
Dominican Republic	15
15 Dec 2023
Puerto Rico	19 OT
Canada	17

Final
15 Dec 2023
United States	21
Puerto Rico	18
Bronze medal
15 Dec 2023
Dominican Republic	16
Canada	21

== Final standings ==
Pos	Team	Pld	W	L	PF	PA	PD
1	United States	5	5	0	104	67	+37
2	Puerto Rico	5	4	1	98	81	+17
3	Canada	5	4	1	99	74	+25
4	Dominican Republic	5	2	3	81	84	-3
5	Chile	3	2	1	42	46	-4
6	Brazil	3	1	2	52	46	+6
7	Jamaica	6	4	2	112	82	+30
8	Mexico	3	1	2	48	54	-6
9	Argentina	2	0	2	25	42	-17
10	Haiti	4	2	2	56	61	-5
11	Uruguay	2	0	2	20	43	-23
12	Colombia	4	2	2	57	59	-2
Eliminated in the qualifying draw
13	Trinidad and Tobago	3	2	1	59	44	+15
14	Cayman Islands	2	1	1	30	31	-1
15	Guatemala	2	1	1	30	35	–5
16	Cuba	3	1	2	29	59	–30
17	Guyana	2	0	2	32	38	–6
18	Saint Lucia	2	0	2	25	34	–9
19	Saint Kitts and Nevis	3	0	3	32	58	–26

== Awards ==
These players were given the awards after the competition:

=== Most valuable player ===
- (United States) Henry Caruso

=== Top scorer ===
- (Canada) Jerome Desrosiers (38 points)

=== Team of the tournament ===
- (United States) Henry Caruso
- (Puerto Rico) Angel Matias
- (Canada) Steve Sir

== See also ==
- 2024 FIBA 3x3 AmeriCup – Women's tournament
- 2024 FIBA 3x3 Europe Cup – Men's tournament
- 2024 FIBA 3x3 Europe Cup – Women's tournament
- 2024 FIBA 3x3 Asia Cup – Men's tournament
- 2024 FIBA 3x3 Asia Cup – Women's tournament
- 2024 FIBA 3x3 Africa Cup – Men's tournament
- 2024 FIBA 3x3 Africa Cup – Women's tournament
