= Zhu Yuanbo =

Chinese basketball player

Personal information
- Born: 7 November 1993 (age 33) Jiangsu, China
- Listed height: 2.03 m (6 ft 8 in)

Zhu Yuanbo (Chinese: 朱渊博 , born 7 November 1993) is a Chinese basketball player. He represented China at the 2024 Summer Olympics in 3x3 event.
