= 2014 FIBA 3x3 World Championships – Men's tournament =

2014 FIBA 3x3 World Championships
Tournament details
- Host country: Russia
- City: Moscow
- Dates: June 5–8
- Teams: 24

Final positions
- Champions: Qatar (1st title)
- Runners-up: Serbia
- Third place: Russia
- Fourth place: Lithuania

The men's tournament of the 2014 FIBA 3x3 World Championships was held in Moscow, Russia, and was contested by 24 teams.

== Participating teams ==
All five FIBA zones were represented. The top 24 teams, including the hosts, based on the FIBA National Federation ranking qualified for the tournament.

FIBA Asia (4)

- China (21)
- Indonesia (20)
- Japan (12)
- Qatar (23)

FIBA Africa (1)

- Tunisia (24)

FIBA Oceania (1)

- New Zealand (19)

FIBA Americas (6)

- Argentina (18)
- Brazil (3)
- Puerto Rico (22)
- Uruguay (14)
- United States (9)
- Venezuela (15)

FIBA Europe (12)

- Croatia (13)
- Czech Republic (17)
- Estonia (11)
- Germany (8)
- Lithuania (7)
- Netherlands (16)
- Poland (1)
- Romania (2)
- Russia (10) (hosts)
- Serbia (5)
- Slovenia (4)
- Turkey (6)

== Preliminary round ==
=== Pool A ===
Team	Pld	W	L	PF	PA	PD	Pts
Poland^{[a]}	5	4	1	90	76	+14	9
Czech Republic^{[a]}	5	4	1	88	67	+21	9
Tunisia	5	4	1	64	60	+4	9
United States	5	2	3	88	81	+7	7
Netherlands	5	1	4	48	62	−14	6
Germany	5	0	5	44	76	−32	5

Pts Ave
18.0
17.6
12.8
17.6
9.6
8.8

(Poland)	(Czech Republic)	(Tunisia)	(United States)	(Netherlands)	(Germany)
—	22–21	9–10	20–18	22–16	17–11
21–22	—	17–11	21–15	8–7	21–12
10–9	11–17	—	21–20	13–7	9–7
18–20	15–21	20–21	—	13–11	22–8
16–22	7–8	7–13	11–13	—	7–6
11–17	12–21	7–9	8–22	6–7	—

Notes

^{a} : Poland–Czech Republic 22–21

=== Pool B ===
Team	Pld	W	L	PF	PA	PD	Pts
Lithuania	5	4	1	86	63	+23	9
Romania^{[a]}	5	3	2	89	79	+10	8
Russia^{[a]}	5	3	2	88	67	+21	8
Qatar	5	3	2	75	75	0	8
Argentina	5	2	3	58	84	−26	7
Venezuela	5	0	5	63	91	−28	5

Pts Ave
17.2
17.8
17.6
15.0
11.6
12.6

(Lithuania)	(Romania)	(Russia)	(Qatar)	(Argentina)	(Venezuela)
—	17–16	19–13	11–15	18–8	21–11
16–17	—	19–17	17–15	18–19	19–11
13–19	17–19	—	19–14	21–3	18–12
15–11	15–17	14–19	—	14–12	17–16
8–18	19–18	3–21	12–14	—	16–13
11–21	11–19	12–18	16–17	13–16	—

Notes

^{a} : Romania–Russia 19–17

=== Pool C ===
Team	Pld	W	L	PF	PA	PD	Pts
Estonia	5	4	1	78	58	+20	9
Uruguay^{[a]}	5	3	2	66	70	−4	8
New Zealand^{[a]}	5	3	2	73	57	+16	8
Puerto Rico	5	2	3	56	69	−13	7
Turkey	5	2	3	80	91	−11	7
Brazil	5	1	4	73	81	−8	6

Pts Ave
15.6
13.2
14.6
11.2
16.0
14.6

(Estonia)	(Uruguay)	(New Zealand)	(Puerto Rico)	(Turkey)	(Brazil)
—	14–6	10–6	14–8	18–19	22–19
6–14	—	16–15	13–7	14–21	17–13
6–10	15–16	—	14–7	21–14	17–10
8–14	7–13	7–14	—	20–15	14–13
19–18	21–14	14–21	15–20	—	11–18
19–22	13–17	10–17	13–14	18–11	—

Notes

^{a} : Uruguay–New Zealand 16–15

=== Pool D ===
Team	Pld	W	L	PF	PA	PD	Pts
Serbia	5	4	1	100	66	+34	9
Croatia	5	4	1	96	66	+30	9
Slovenia	5	4	1	92	69	+23	9
China	5	2	3	68	83	−15	7
Japan	5	1	4	73	85	−12	6
Indonesia	5	0	5	42	102	−60	5

Pts Ave
20.0
19.2
18.4
13.6
14.6
8.4

(Serbia)	(Croatia)	(Slovenia)	(China)	(Japan)	(Indonesia)
—	18–19	21–18	21–14	21–9	19–6
19–18	—	14–15	21–8	21–18	21–7
18–21	15–14	—	19–11	18–14	22–9
14–21	8–21	11–19	—	14–13	21–9
9–21	18–21	14–18	13–14	—	19–11
6–19	7–21	9–22	9–21	11–19	—

Source: FIBA

== Knockout stage ==
Last 16
A1	Poland	17
D4	China	7
C2	Uruguay	9
B3	Russia	21
D1	Serbia	19
A4	United States	15
B2	Romania	19
C3	New Zealand	16
C1	Estonia	10
B4	Qatar	18
A2	Czech Republic	21
D3	Slovenia	8
B1	Lithuania	14
C4	Puerto Rico	10
D2	Croatia	21
A3	Tunisia	10

Quarter-Finals
A1	Poland	17
B3	Russia	21
D1	Serbia	22
B2	Romania	21
B4	Qatar	21
A2	Czech Republic	17
B1	Lithuania	20
D2	Croatia	18

Semi-Finals
B3	Russia	11
D1	Serbia	19
B4	Qatar	14
B1	Lithuania	13

Final
D1	Serbia	13
B4	Qatar	18
Third place
B3	Russia	19
B1	Lithuania	18

== Awards ==
2014 FIBA 3x3 World Champions – Men's

Qatar
First title

== Dunk contest ==
The Dunk Contest also called Nike Dunk Contest due to sponsorship reasons, was held from 7–8 June 2014. Each team can enter 1 player to participate in the dunk contest. There are two phases, the qualification and the final, which consists of the semi-finals and final). Each player has three attempts to complete both a first and a second dunk which was graded by members of the jury (0 or 5-10). 7 players entered to the competition.

Qualification

Player	Score from Dunks		
Player	1st	2nd	Total
Firas Lahyani (TUN)	29	30	59
Yan Pengfei (CHN)	24	24	48
Toni Vitali (CRO)	21	23	44
Demetrius Miller (USA)	20	0	20^{[a]}
Patrich Bolstad (NZL)	20	0	20^{[a]}
Jan Stehlik (CZE)	19	0	19
José Lopez (PUR)	19	0	19
^{[a]}:Miller qualifies after winning a tie-breaker against Bolstad

Final Standing

After the Final held on 8 June 2014.

	Player	Total Score
1st place, gold medalist(s)	Firas Lahyani (TUN)	119
2nd place, silver medalist(s)	Yan Pengfei (CHN)	74
3rd place, bronze medalist(s)	Demetrius Miller (USA)	47
3rd place, bronze medalist(s)	Toni Vitali (CRO)	46
