= Trinidad and Tobago men's national 3x3 team =

National 3x3 basketball team

Trinidad and Tobago
- FIBA zone: FIBA Americas
- National federation: National Basketball Federation of Trinidad and Tobago

AmeriCup
- Appearances: 3

The Trinidad and Tobago men's national 3x3 team is a national basketball team of Trinidad and Tobago, administered by the National Basketball Federation of Trinidad and Tobago. It represents the country in international 3x3 (3 against 3) basketball competitions.

== AmeriCup record ==
Year	Position	Pld	W	L
(United States) 2021 Miami	did not qualify			
(United States) 2022 Miami	4th	5	2	3
(Puerto Rico) 2023 San Juan	did not qualify			
(Puerto Rico) 2024 San Juan	did not qualify			
(Mexico) 2025 León	10th	2	0	2
(El Salvador) 2026 San Salvador	12th	2	0	2
Total	3/6	9	2	7
