= Chike Augustine =

Trinidad and Tobago basketball player

No. 11 – CB Socuéllamos
- Position: Center
- League: Liga EBA

Personal information
- Born: 11 November 1992 (age 34) Port of Spain, Trinidad and Tobago
- Listed height: 2.08 m (6 ft 10 in)

Career information
- College: Martin Methodist (2015–2019)
- Playing career: 2019–present

Career history
- 2019–2021: Aloe Plus Lanzarote Conejeros
- 2021–present: CB Socuéllamos
Medals
Men's 3x3 basketball
Representing Trinidad and Tobago
Pan American Games
Bronze medal – third place	2023 Santiago	Team

Chike Augustine (born 11 November 1992) is a Trinidad and Tobago basketball player.

== College career ==
Chike Augustine received an athletic scholarship for Martin Methodist College (MMC) in 2015 following his participation in the Caribbean Hoops 25/8 Exposure Camp in Trinidad.

At MMC he played four years total. His last collegiate game was on February 28 against Stillman College in the Southern States Athletic Conference (SSAC) Men’s Basketball Championship.

Altogether, Augustine accumulated 294 rebounds and 85 blocks in a total of 97 games throughout his college career.

In the 2016-2017 season he was ranked number 17 in the National Association of Intercollegiate Athletics (NAIA) Division I SSAC in total blocks (42), and number 18 in blocks per game (1.400).

== Professional career ==
In the 2019-20 season he played a total of 16 games with Aloe Plus Lanzarote Conejeros, in which he scored 124 points with an average of 7.8 per game. He grabbed 101 rebounds, most of them in defensive actions, put up 17 blocks and had 132 efficiency points.

In October 2020, he renewed his contract with Lanzarote in their fifth season in the EBA League, after what was described as a "great performance in the team's inner game". Chike Augustine would continue his tenure with the alongside teammates Richard Nguema and Elvis Pereira who also received a contract extension.

== Personal ==
Augustine is originally from Port of Spain, Trinidad and Tobago.

He measures six-foot 10-inches.

At Martin Methodist College Augustine pursued a Bachelor of Science in Sport management. He expressed future plans on doing broadcasting journalism.

== Player profile ==
At college, Chike Augustine played the forward position. There, he was known for his defensive presence.

Since the start of his professional career, he has played center.
