= 2022 FIBA 3x3 AmeriCup – Men's tournament =

Basketball competition in Miami, US

Tournament details
- Host country: United States
- City: Miami
- Dates: 4–6 November
- Teams: 18
- Venue(s): FTX Arena

Final positions
- Champions: United States (2nd title)
- Runners-up: Puerto Rico
- Third place: Brazil
- Fourth place: Trinidad and Tobago

Tournament statistics
- MVP: (United States) Canyon Barry

The 2022 FIBA 3x3 AmeriCup – Men's tournament is the second edition of this continental championship. The event was held in Miami, United States. It was contested by 18 teams.

United States successfully defended their title with a win over, after defeated Puerto Rico in the final by the scoreline 21–18. While in the third place play off, Brazil defeated surprise package, Trinidad and Tobago, to claim bronze.

== Host selection ==
Miami was given the hosting rights for the second successive time.

== Participating teams ==
All National Federations in the Americas region were invited to register a team for the 2022 FIBA 3x3 AmeriCup.

=== Preliminary round ===
Pool A

- United States (1)
- Brazil (4)
- Guatemala (12)

Pool B

- Puerto Rico (2)
- Argentina (8)
- Trinidad and Tobago (14)

Pool C

- Canada (3)
- Mexico (7)
- Qualifier A

Pool D

- Dominican Republic (5)
- Chile (6)
- Qualifier B

=== Qualifying draw ===
Pool A

- Ecuador (9)
- Guyana (13)
- Haiti (15)
- Aruba (16)

Pool B

- Saint Lucia (10)
- Jamaica (11)
- Colombia (17)
- Barbados (18)

== Qualifying draw ==
The two group winners qualify for the next round.

=== Pool A ===
| Pos | Team | Pld | W | L | PF | PA | PD | Qualification | (Guyana) | (Ecuador) | (Haiti) | (Aruba) |
|---|---|---|---|---|---|---|---|---|---|---|---|---|
| 1 | Guyana | 3 | 3 | 0 | 52 | 43 | +9 | Preliminary round | | 13–12 | | 20–14 |
| 2 | Ecuador | 3 | 2 | 1 | 48 | 42 | +6 | | | | 16–11 | 20–18 |
| 3 | Haiti | 3 | 1 | 2 | 49 | 39 | +10 | | 17–19 | | | |
| 4 | Aruba | 3 | 0 | 3 | 36 | 61 | −25 | | | | 4–21 | |

Source: FIBA
Rules for classification: 1) Wins; 2) Head-to-head record; 3) Points scored.

=== Pool B ===
| Pos | Team | Pld | W | L | PF | PA | PD | Qualification | (Saint Lucia) | (Barbados) | (Jamaica) | (Colombia) |
|---|---|---|---|---|---|---|---|---|---|---|---|---|
| 1 | Saint Lucia | 2 | 2 | 0 | 34 | 32 | +2 | Preliminary round | | 17–16 | 17–16 | Canc. |
| 2 | Barbados | 2 | 1 | 1 | 35 | 35 | 0 | | | | | Canc. |
| 3 | Jamaica | 2 | 0 | 2 | 34 | 36 | −2 | | | 18–19 | | Canc. |
| 4 | Colombia | 0 | 0 | 0 | 0 | 0 | 0 | Withdrew | Canc. | Canc. | Canc. | |

Source: FIBA
Rules for classification: 1) Wins; 2) Head-to-head record; 3) Points scored.

== Preliminary round ==
=== Pool A ===
| Pos | Team | Pld | W | L | PF | PA | PD | Qualification | (United States) | (Brazil) | (Guatemala) |
|---|---|---|---|---|---|---|---|---|---|---|---|
| 1 | United States (H) | 2 | 2 | 0 | 41 | 21 | +20 | quarter-finals | | 19–15 | 22–6 |
| 2 | Brazil | 2 | 1 | 1 | 36 | 33 | +3 | quarter-finals | | | |
| 3 | Guatemala | 2 | 0 | 2 | 20 | 43 | −23 | | | 14–21 | |

Source: FIBA
Rules for classification: 1) Wins; 2) Head-to-head record; 3) Points scored.
(H) Hosts

=== Pool B ===
| Pos | Team | Pld | W | L | PF | PA | PD | Qualification | (Puerto Rico) | (Trinidad and Tobago) | (Argentina) |
|---|---|---|---|---|---|---|---|---|---|---|---|
| 1 | Puerto Rico | 2 | 2 | 0 | 37 | 28 | +9 | quarter-finals | | 21–15 | 16–13 |
| 2 | Trinidad and Tobago | 2 | 1 | 1 | 32 | 33 | −1 | quarter-finals | | | |
| 3 | Argentina | 2 | 0 | 2 | 25 | 33 | −8 | | | 12–17 | |

Source: FIBA
Rules for classification: 1) Wins; 2) Head-to-head record; 3) Points scored.

=== Pool C ===
| Pos | Team | Pld | W | L | PF | PA | PD | Qualification | (Canada) | (Mexico) | (Guyana) |
|---|---|---|---|---|---|---|---|---|---|---|---|
| 1 | Canada | 2 | 2 | 0 | 43 | 18 | +25 | quarter-finals | | 18–15 | 19–17 |
| 2 | Mexico | 2 | 1 | 1 | 25 | 37 | −12 | quarter-finals | | | 16–15 |
| 3 | Guyana | 2 | 0 | 2 | 24 | 37 | −13 | | | | |

Source: FIBA
Rules for classification: 1) Wins; 2) Head-to-head record; 3) Points scored.

=== Pool D ===
| Pos | Team | Pld | W | L | PF | PA | PD | Qualification | (Dominican Republic) | (Chile) | (Saint Lucia) |
|---|---|---|---|---|---|---|---|---|---|---|---|
| 1 | Dominican Republic | 2 | 2 | 0 | 42 | 23 | +19 | quarter-finals | | 21–13 | 21–10 |
| 2 | Chile | 2 | 1 | 1 | 32 | 35 | −3 | quarter-finals | | | 19–14 |
| 3 | Saint Lucia | 2 | 0 | 2 | 24 | 40 | −16 | | | | |

Source: FIBA
Rules for classification: 1) Wins; 2) Head-to-head record; 3) Points scored.

== Knockout stage ==
All times are local.

Quarter-finals
06 Nov 2022 – 11:35
United States | 21
Mexico | 19
06 Nov 2022 – 12:00
Dominican Republic | 15
Trinidad and Tobago | 16
06 Nov 2022 – 13:25
Puerto Rico | 21
Chile | 12
06 Nov 2022 – 13:50
Canada | 16
Brazil | 13

Semi-finals
06 Nov 2022 – 15:15
United States | 21
Trinidad and Tobago | 15
06 Nov 2022 – 15:40
Puerto Rico | 21
Brazil | 15

Final
06 Nov 2022 – 17:45
United States | 21
Puerto Rico | 18
Bronze medal
06 Nov 2022 – 16:45
Trinidad and Tobago | 09
Brazil | 21

== Final standings ==
| Pos | Team | Pld | W | L | PF | PA | PD |
|---|---|---|---|---|---|---|---|
| 1 | United States | 5 | 5 | 0 | 104 | 73 | +31 |
| 2 | Puerto Rico | 5 | 4 | 1 | 97 | 76 | +21 |
| 3 | Brazil | 5 | 3 | 2 | 88 | 76 | +12 |
| 4 | Trinidad and Tobago | 5 | 2 | 3 | 72 | 89 | –17 |
| 5 | Dominican Republic | 3 | 2 | 1 | 57 | 39 | +18 |
| 6 | Canada | 3 | 2 | 1 | 56 | 34 | +18 |
| 7 | Chile | 3 | 1 | 2 | 44 | 56 | –12 |
| 8 | Mexico | 3 | 1 | 2 | 44 | 58 | –14 |
| 9 | Argentina | 2 | 0 | 2 | 25 | 33 | –8 |
| 10 | Saint Lucia | 5 | 3 | 2 | 58 | 72 | –14 |
| 11 | Guyana | 5 | 3 | 2 | 76 | 80 | –4 |
| 12 | Guatemala | 2 | 0 | 2 | 20 | 43 | –23 |
| 13 | Barbados | 2 | 1 | 1 | 35 | 35 | 0 |
| 14 | Ecuador | 3 | 2 | 1 | 48 | 27 | +3 |
| 15 | Jamaica | 2 | 0 | 2 | 34 | 36 | –2 |
| 16 | Haiti | 3 | 1 | 2 | 49 | 39 | +10 |
| 17 | Aruba | 3 | 0 | 3 | 36 | 61 | –25 |

== Awards ==
These players were given the awards after the competition:

=== Most valuable player ===
- (United States) Canyon Barry

=== Top scorer ===
- (Trinidad and Tobago) Ahkeel Jalanie Boyd (35 points)

=== Team of the tournament ===
- (United States) Canyon Barry
- (Puerto Rico) Jorge Matos
- (Brazil) Leonardo Branquinho

== See also ==
- 2022 FIBA 3x3 World Cup – Men's tournament
- 2022 FIBA 3x3 World Cup – Women's tournament
- 2022 FIBA 3x3 AmeriCup – Women's tournament
- 2022 FIBA 3x3 Africa Cup
- 2022 FIBA 3x3 U17 Africa Cup – Men's tournament
- 2022 FIBA 3x3 U17 Africa Cup – Women's tournament
- 2022 FIBA 3x3 Asia Cup
- 2022 FIBA 3x3 Europe Cup
