= Puerto Rico men's national 3x3 team =

Basketball team

Puerto Rico
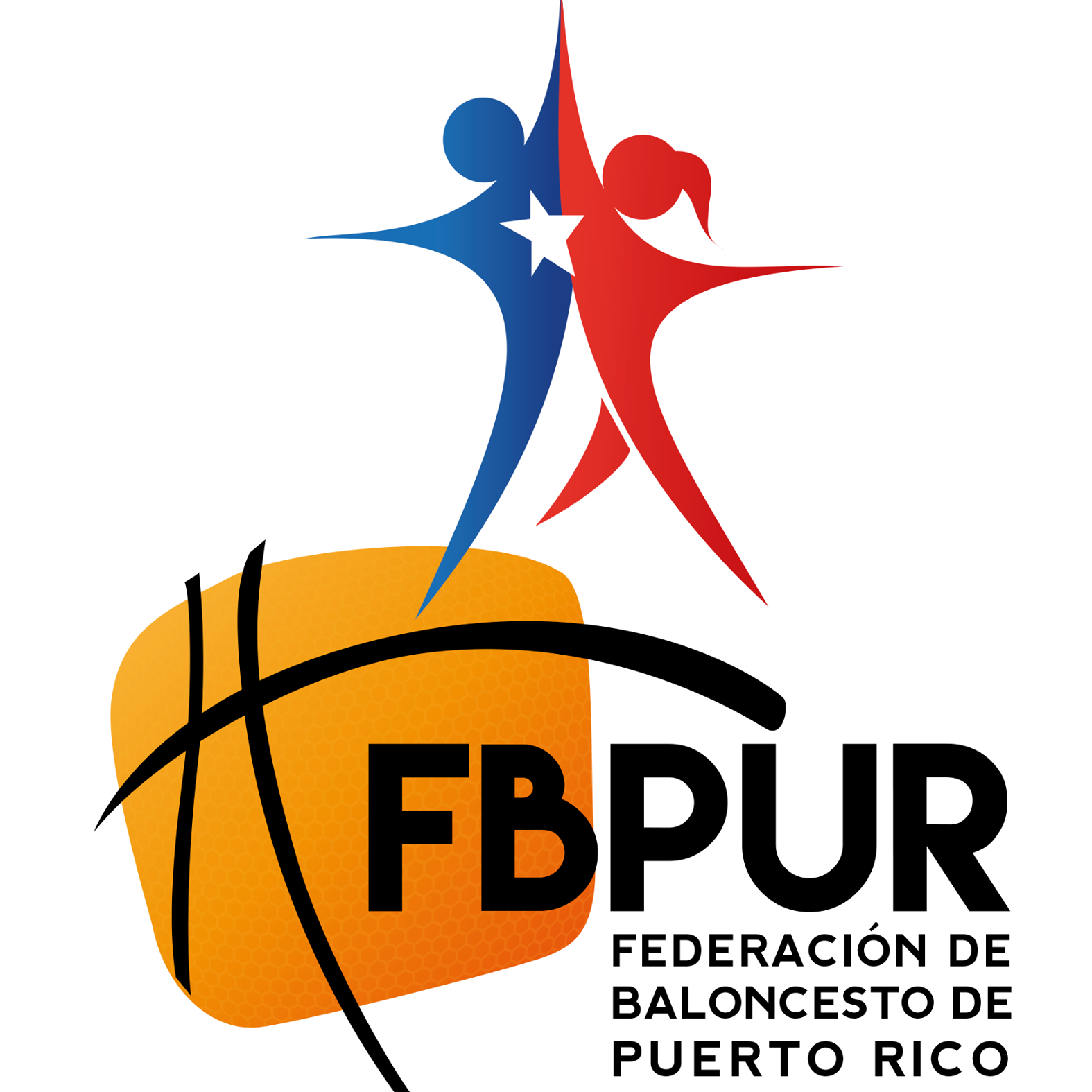
- FIBA ranking: 14
- Joined FIBA: 1957
- FIBA zone: FIBA Americas
- National federation: Puerto Rican Basketball Federation
- Coach: Pedro González

World Cup
- Appearances: 7

Pan American Games
- Appearances: 2
- Medals: (silver) (2019)

AmeriCup
- Appearances: 6
- Medals: (gold) (2023); (silver) (2022, 2024, 2025); (bronze) (2026)

Central American and Caribbean Games
- Appearances: 2
- Medals: (gold) (2018, 2023)

The Puerto Rico men's national 3x3 team (Spanish: Selección de baloncesto 3x3 de Puerto Rico) represents Puerto Rico in international 3x3 basketball matches and is governed by the Puerto Rican Basketball Federation (Federación de Baloncesto de Puerto Rico).

== Competitions ==
=== World Cup ===
Year	Position	Pld	W	L
(Greece) 2012 Athens	Did not qualify			
(Russia) 2014 Moscow	16	6	2	4
(China) 2016 Guangzhou	Did not qualify			
(France) 2017 Nantes	9th	4	2	2
(Philippines) 2018 Bocaue	Did not qualify			
(Netherlands) 2019 Amsterdam	5th	5	3	2
(Belgium) 2022 Antwerp	13th	4	1	3
(Austria) 2023 Vienna	13th	4	2	2
(Mongolia) 2025 Ulaanbaatar	6th	6	4	2
(Poland) 2026 Warsaw	16th	4	1	3
2027 Singapore	To be determined			
Total	7/11	33	15	18

=== AmeriCup ===
Year	Position	Pld	W	L
(United States) 2021 Miami	4th	5	3	2
(United States) 2022 Miami	2nd place, silver medalist(s)	5	4	1
(Puerto Rico) 2023 San Juan	1st place, gold medalist(s)	5	5	0
(Puerto Rico) 2024 San Juan	2nd place, silver medalist(s)	5	4	1
(Mexico) 2025 León	2nd place, silver medalist(s)	5	4	1
(El Salvador) 2026 San Salvador	3rd place, bronze medalist(s)	5	4	1
Total	6/6	30	24	6

== See also ==
- Puerto Rican Basketball Federation
- Puerto Rico men's national basketball team
- Puerto Rico women's national basketball team
