= United States men's national 3x3 team =

Basketball team in the US

United States
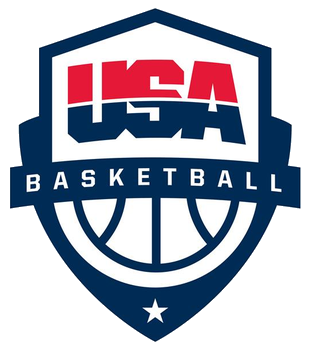
- FIBA ranking: 5
- FIBA zone: FIBA Americas
- National federation: USA Basketball

Olympic Games
- Appearances: 1
- Medals: 0

World Cup
- Appearances: 9
- Medals: Gold: (2019); Silver: (2016, 2023)

Pan American Games
- Appearances: 2
- Medals: Gold: (2019, 2023)

AmeriCup
- Appearances: 6
- Medals: Gold: (2021, 2022, 2024, 2025, 2026)
Medal record
World Cup
Gold medal – first place	2019 Amsterdam	Team
Silver medal – second place	2016 China	Team
Silver medal – second place	2023 Vienna	Team
Pan American Games
Gold medal – first place	2019 Lima	Team
Gold medal – first place	2023 Santiago	Team
AmeriCup
Gold medal – first place	2021 Miami
Gold medal – first place	2022 Miami
Gold medal – first place	2024 San Juan
Gold medal – first place	2025 León
Gold medal – first place	2026 El Salvador

The United States men's national 3x3 team is a national 3x3 basketball team of the United States, governed by USA Basketball. Its managing director is Jimmer Fredette.

== Competitions ==
=== Olympic Games ===
Year	Result	Position	Pld	W	L	Players
(Japan) 2020 Tokyo	did not qualify					Hummel, Jones, King, Maddox
(France) 2024 Paris	Seventh place	7th	7	2	5	Barry, Fredette, Maddox, Travis
Total	0 Title	1/2	7	2	5	

=== World Cup ===
Year	Result	Position	Pld	W	L	Players
(Greece) 2012 Athens	Quarter-finals	7th	7	5	2	Adensaya, Brown, Hardge, Williams
(Russia) 2014 Moscow	Group stage	14th	6	2	4	Darrow, Miller, Moore, Young
(China) 2016 Guangzhou	Runners-up	2nd	7	6	1	Hannah, Henry, Latch, McKinnie
(France) 2017 Nantes	Quarter-finals	6th	5	3	2	Carrington, Huffman, Mavraides, Moore
(Philippines) 2018 Bocaue	did not qualify					
(Netherlands) 2019 Amsterdam	Champions	1st	7	7	0	Barry, Huffman, Hummel, Maddox
(Belgium) 2022 Antwerp	Quarter-finals	7th	6	4	2	Brutus, Iverson, Jones, Parrott
(Austria) 2023 Vienna	Runners-up	2nd	7	6	1	Barry, Fredette, Maddox, Travis
(Mongolia) 2025 Ulaanbaatar	Quarter-finals	5th	5	4	1	Caruso, Hahn, Parrott, Travis
(Poland) 2026 Warsaw	Quarter-finals	8th	5	3	2	Caruso, Hahn, Parrott, Travis
2027 Singapore	to be determined					
Total	1 Title	9/11	55	40	15	

=== Pan American Games ===
Year	Result	Position	Pld	W	L	Players
(Peru) 2019 Lima	Gold medalists	1st	7	4	3	Jeter, Octeus, Jones, Maddox
(Chile) 2023 Santiago	Gold medalists	1st	5	5	0	Barry, Fredette, Maddox, Travis
Total	2 Titles	2/2	12	4	3	

=== AmeriCup ===
Year	Result	Position	Pld	W	L	Players
(United States) 2021 Miami	Champions	1st	5	5	0	
(United States) 2022 Miami	Champions	1st	5	5	0	
(Puerto Rico) 2023 San Juan	Quarter finals	6th	3	2	1	
(Puerto Rico) 2024 San Juan	Champions	1st	5	5	0	
(Mexico) 2025 León	Champions	1st	5	5	0	
(El Salvador) 2026 San Salvador	Champions	1st	5	5	0	
Total	5 Titles	6/6	28	27	1	

=== Champions Cup ===
Year	Result	Position	Pld	W	L
(Thailand) 2025 Bangkok	Semi finals	4th	5	2	3
(Thailand) 2026 Bangkok	Champions	1st	5	4	1
Total	1 Title	2/2	10	6	4

== Honours ==
=== Medals table ===
Games	Gold	Silver	Bronze	Total
Olympic Games	0	0	0	0
3x3 World Cup	1	2	0	3
Pan American Games	2	0	0	2
3x3 AmeriCup	3	0	0	2
Totals	5	2	0	7

=== Individual awards ===
- FIBA 3x3 World Cup MVP
  - Robbie Hummel – 2019
- FIBA 3x3 World Cup Team of the Tournament
  - Myke Henry – 2016
  - Robbie Hummel – 2019
  - Jimmer Fredette – 2023
- FIBA 3x3 AmeriCup MVP
  - Canyon Barry – 2022
  - Henry Caruso - 2024
- FIBA 3x3 AmeriCup Cup Team of the Tournament
  - Canyon Barry – 2022
  - Henry Caruso - 2024

== See also ==
- United States women's national 3x3 team
- United States men's national basketball team
- United States women's national basketball team
