= 2026 FIBA 3x3 World Cup – Men's tournament =

International basketball competition in Warsaw, Poland

2026 FIBA 3x3 World Cup

Tournament details
- Host country: Poland
- City: Warsaw
- Dates: 1–7 June
- Teams: 20

Final positions
- Champions: Latvia (1st title)
- Runners-up: Germany
- Third place: Serbia
- Fourth place: France

Tournament statistics
- MVP: (Latvia) Karlis Lasmanis

The 2026 FIBA 3x3 World Cup was held in Warsaw, Poland from 1 to 7 June 2026, and contested by 20 teams.

Latvia won their first title with a finals win over Germany.

== Qualified teams ==
The host, along the winners of the four zone cups of four FIBA zones, and the three winners of the qualifiers qualified. The other twelve teams qualified based on the FIBA National Federation rankings.

Team	Qualification method	Appearance(s)				Previous best performance (Note: Bold text indicates they hosted that edition.)	WR (Note: 3x3 World Rankings at the start of the event.)
Team	Qualification method	Total	First	Last	Streak	Previous best performance	WR
Poland	Host nation	8th	2014	2023	1	Third place (2019)	20
Australia	2025 3x3 Asia Cup	4th	2019	2025	3	Tenth place (2019, 2025)	36
China	FIBA National Federation rankings	6th	2014	2025	2	Eighth place (2025)	9
Japan	FIBA National Federation rankings	8th	2014	2025	6	Eleventh place (2016)	14
Mongolia	FIBA National Federation rankings	6th	2018	2025	6	Eighth place (2018)	11
Austria	FIBA National Federation rankings	4th	2022	2025	4	Sixth place (2023)	10
Belgium	FIBA National Federation rankings	4th	2022	2025	4	Fourth place (2022)	12
France	FIBA National Federation rankings	7th	2012	2025	5	Runners-up (2012)	5
Germany	FIBA National Federation rankings	5th	2014	2025	4	Fourth place (2025)	6
Latvia	FIBA National Federation rankings	7th	2012	2025	6	Runners-up (2019)	8
Lithuania	2025 3x3 Europe Cup	6th	2014	2025	5	Runners-up (2022)	4
Netherlands	FIBA National Federation rankings	9th	2014	2025	9	Runners-up (2017, 2018)	3
Serbia	FIBA National Federation rankings	10th	2012	2025	10	Champions (2012, 2016, 2017, 2018, 2022, 2023)	1
Spain	FIBA National Federation rankings	4th	2012	2025	2	Champions (2025)	7
Puerto Rico	FIBA National Federation rankings	7th	2014	2025	5	Fifth place (2019)	13
United States	2025 3x3 AmeriCup	9th	2012	2025	5	Champions (2019)	2
Madagascar	2025 3x3 Africa Cup	3rd	2023	2025	3	16th place (2023)	52
New Zealand	3x3 World Cup Qualifier	6th	2014	2022	1	Runners-up (2017, 2019)	23
Czech Republic	3x3 World Cup Qualifier	3rd	2012	2014	1	Sixth place (2014)	18
Brazil	3x3 World Cup Qualifier	7th	2012	2023	1	Fourth place (2023)	44

== Players ==
Seed	Team	Players			
1	Serbia	Nemanja Barać	Andreja Milutinović	Nenad Neranđić	Strahinja Stojačić
2	United States	Henry Caruso	Mitch Hahn	James Parrott	Dylan Travis
3	Netherlands	Bryan Alberts	Jan Driessen	Adriaan van Tilborg	Worthy de Jong
4	Lithuania	Evaldas Džiaugys	Rokas Jocys	Aurelijus Pukelis	Ignas Vaitkus
5	France	Emmanuel Monceau	Jules Rambaut	Hugo Suhard	Alex Vialaret
6	Germany	Denzel Agyeman	Kevin Bryant	Fabian Giessmann	Niklas Kropp
7	Latvia	Francis Lācis	Kārlis Lasmanis	Nauris Miezis	Zigmārs Raimo
8	Austria	Toni Blazan	Quincy Diggs	Nico Kaltenbrunner	Fabio Söhnel
9	Spain	Iván Aurrecoechea	Diego de Blas	Guim Expósito	Carlos Martínez
10	Mongolia	Ariunboldyn Anand	Erdenetsetsegiin Sugar-Ochir	Gankhuyagiin Dölgöön	Gantsolmongiin Bolor-Erdene
11	China	Guo Hanyu	Lu Pengcheng	Wu Xingrui	Zhang Dianliang
12	Belgium	Caspar Augustijnen	Bryan De Valck	Dennis Donkor	Jonas Foerts
13	Puerto Rico	Leandro Allende	Luis Cuascut	Bryan González	Miguel Martínez
14	Japan	Souleymane Coulibaly	Kenya Igo	Yuki Nakanishi	Ryo Ozawa
15	Czech Republic	Štěpán Borovka	Filip Novotný	Adam Růžička	Lukáš Stegbauer
16	Poland	Marcel Ponitka	Michał Sokołowski	Adam Waczyński	Przemysław Zamojski
17	New Zealand	Joshua Book	Te Tuhi Lewis	Chris Martin	Aidan Tonge
18	Australia	Jonah Antonio	Jarred Bairstow	Lachlan Barker	Alex Higgins-Titsha
19	Brazil	Leo Branquinho	Leandro da Silva	Jonatas Mello	William Weihermann
20	Madagascar	Marco Rakotovao	Elly Randriamampionona	Anthony Rasolomanana	Alpha Solondrainy

== Preliminary round ==
The pools were announced on 15 April 2026.

All times are local (UTC+2).

=== Pool A ===
Pos	Team	Pld	W	L	PF	PA	PR	Qualification
1	Serbia	4	4	0	78	53	1.472	Quarterfinals
2	Austria	4	3	1	69	64	1.078	Round of 16
3	Madagascar	4	2	2	70	77	0.909	Round of 16
4	Spain	4	1	3	66	65	1.015	
5	Australia	4	0	4	59	83	0.711	

Source: FIBA
Rules for classification: 1) Wins; 2) Head-to-head record; 3) Points scored.

1 June 2026
17:55

Boxscore

Austria	20–15	Madagascar
Pts: Kaltenbrunner 6		Pts: Rakotovao 6

Parade Square, Warsaw
Referees: Riannan De La Torre (AUS), Alex Talisainen (EST)

1 June 2026
19:20

Boxscore

Spain	21–12	Australia
Pts: Aurrecoechea 11		Pts: Barker 4

Parade Square, Warsaw
Referees: Deanna Jackson (USA), Vladimir Vesković (SRB)

1 June 2026
19:45

Boxscore

Madagascar	14–21	Serbia
Pts: Randriamampionona 7		Pts: Nerandžić 10

Parade Square, Warsaw
Referees: Deanna Jackson (USA), Alex Talisainen (EST)

1 June 2026
21:10

Boxscore

Australia	14–21	Austria
Pts: Antonio 7		Pts: Blazan 7

Parade Square, Warsaw
Referees: Deanna Jackson (USA), Najib Chajiddine (FRA)

1 June 2026
21:35

Boxscore

Spain	12–16	Serbia
Pts: Martínez 5		Pts: Stojačić 9

Parade Square, Warsaw
Referees: Najib Chajiddine (FRA), Alex Talisainen (EST)

3 June 2026
17:55

Boxscore

Australia	17–22	Madagascar
Pts: Antonio 7		Pts: Randriamampionona 8

Parade Square, Warsaw
Referees: Najib Chajiddine (FRA), Alex Talisainen (EST)

3 June 2026
19:20

Boxscore

Austria	17–14	Spain
Pts: Blazan, Kaltenbrunner 6		Pts: Aurrecoechea, De Blas 6

Parade Square, Warsaw
Referees: Najib Chajiddine (FRA), Riannan De La Torre (AUS)

3 June 2026
19:45

Boxscore

Serbia	20–16	Australia
Pts: Barać, Neranđić 8		Pts: Higgins-Titsha 7

Parade Square, Warsaw
Referees: Deanna Jackson (USA), Alex Talisainen (EST)

3 June 2026
21:10

Boxscore

Madagascar	20–19	Spain
Pts: Randriamampionona 10		Pts: Aurrecoechea, De Blas 6

Parade Square, Warsaw
Referees: Riannan De La Torre (AUS), Deanna Jackson (USA)

3 June 2026
21:35

Boxscore

Serbia	21–11	Austria
Pts: Stojačić 8		Pts: Söhnel 4

Parade Square, Warsaw
Referees: Alex Talisainen (EST), Deanna Jackson (USA)

=== Pool B ===
Pos	Team	Pld	W	L	PF	PA	PR	Qualification
1	United States	4	3 (Note: Head-to-head: One win, one loss, ranked by points scored)	1	80	68	1.176	Quarterfinals
2	Latvia	4	3	1	78	64	1.219	Round of 16
3	Czech Republic	4	3	1	74	70	1.057	Round of 16
4	Mongolia	4	1	3	66	79	0.835	
5	Poland (H)	4	0	4	68	85	0.800	

Source: FIBA
Rules for classification: 1) Wins; 2) Head-to-head record; 3) Points scored.
(H) Hosts
Notes:

2 June 2026
17:55

Boxscore

Czech Republic	17–14	Mongolia
Pts: Novotný 8		Pts: Erdenetsetseg, Gankhuyag 5

Parade Square, Warsaw
Referees: Deanna Jackson (USA), Vladimir Vesković (SRB)

2 June 2026
19:20

Boxscore

United States	17–14	Latvia
Pts: Parrott 8		Pts: Lācis 6

Parade Square, Warsaw
Referees: Vladimir Vesković (SRB), Najib Chajiddine (FRA)

2 June 2026
19:45

Boxscore

Mongolia	21–19	Poland
Pts: Ariunboldyn 9		Pts: Zamojski 8

Parade Square, Warsaw
Referees: Najib Chajiddine (FRA), Deanna Jackson (USA)

2 June 2026
21:10

Boxscore

Czech Republic	21–20	United States
Pts: Borovka 8		Pts: Travis 9

Parade Square, Warsaw
Referees: Alex Talisainen (EST), Riannan De La Torre (AUS)

2 June 2026
21:35

Boxscore

Poland	20–22 (OT)	Latvia
Pts: Sokołowski 7		Pts: Lasmanis 9

Parade Square, Warsaw
Referees: Deanna Jackson (USA), Najib Chajiddine (FRA)

4 June 2026
17:55

Boxscore

Latvia	21–15	Czech Republic
Pts: Miezis 8		Pts: Novotný 5

Parade Square, Warsaw
Referees: Riannan De La Torre (AUS), Deanna Jackson (USA)

4 June 2026
19:20

Boxscore

Mongolia	19–22	United States
Pts: Anand 8		Pts: Parrott 9

Parade Square, Warsaw
Referees: Najib Chajiddine (FRA), Alex Talisainen (EST)

4 June 2026
19:45

Boxscore

Poland	15–21	Czech Republic
Pts: Waczyński 9		Pts: Borovka, Novotný 6

Parade Square, Warsaw
Referees: Riannan De La Torre (AUS), Najib Chajiddine (FRA)

4 June 2026
21:10

Boxscore

Latvia	21–12	Mongolia
Pts: Lasmanis 12		Pts: Erdenetsetseg, Gantsolmon 5

Parade Square, Warsaw
Referees: Najib Chajiddine (FRA), Deanna Jackson (USA)

4 June 2026
21:35

Boxscore

United States	21–14	Poland
Pts: Caruso 11		Pts: Sokołowski 7

Parade Square, Warsaw
Referees: Alex Talisainen (EST), Vladimir Vesković (SRB)

=== Pool C ===
Pos	Team	Pld	W	L	PF	PA	PR	Qualification
1	Germany	4	4	0	82	50	1.640	Quarterfinals
2	Netherlands	4	3	1	76	58	1.310	Round of 16
3	New Zealand	4	2	2	63	74	0.851	Round of 16
4	China	4	1	3	62	77	0.805	
5	Japan	4	0	4	58	82	0.707	

Source: FIBA
Rules for classification: 1) Wins; 2) Head-to-head record; 3) Points scored.

1 June 2026
13:20

Boxscore

China	22–14	Japan
Pts: Zhang 11		Pts: Coulibaly 8

Parade Square, Warsaw
Referees: Vladimir Vesković (SRB), Najib Chajiddine (FRA)

1 June 2026
13:45

Boxscore

New Zealand	13–21	Netherlands
Pts: Lewis 4		Pts: Alberts 7

Parade Square, Warsaw
Referees: Alex Talisainen (EST), Riannan De La Torre (AUS)

1 June 2026
15:10

Boxscore

Japan	15–21	Germany
Pts: Ozawa 10		Pts: Agyeman, Giessmann 4

Parade Square, Warsaw
Referees: Riannan De La Torre (AUS), Vladimir Vesković (SRB)

1 June 2026
15:35

Boxscore

China	10–22	Netherlands
Pts: Zhang 5		Pts: De Jong 10

Parade Square, Warsaw
Referees: Najib Chajiddine (FRA), Riannan De La Torre (AUS)

1 June 2026
17:30

Boxscore

Germany	19–10	New Zealand
Pts: Giessmann 11		Pts: Lewis 5

Parade Square, Warsaw
Referees: Vladimir Vesković (SRB), Deanna Jackson (USA)

3 June 2026
13:20

Boxscore

Netherlands	21–14	Japan
Pts: Van Tilborg 8		Pts: Ozawa 6

Parade Square, Warsaw
Referees: Deanna Jackson (USA), Vladimir Vesković (SRB)

3 June 2026
13:45

Boxscore

New Zealand	22–19	China
Pts: Lewis 12		Pts: Lu 9

Parade Square, Warsaw
Referees: Riannan De La Torre (AUS), Najib Chajiddine (FRA)

3 June 2026
15:10

Boxscore

Netherlands	13–21	Germany
Pts: De Jong 7		Pts: Agyeman 10

Parade Square, Warsaw
Referees: Vladimir Vesković (SRB), Najib Chajiddine (FRA)

3 June 2026
15:35

Boxscore

Japan	15–19	New Zealand
Pts: Coulibaly 9		Pts: Tonge 9

Parade Square, Warsaw
Referees: Vladimir Vesković (SRB), Riannan De La Torre (AUS)

3 June 2026
17:30

Boxscore

Germany	22–12	China
Pts: Kropp 9		Pts: Wu, Zhang 4

Parade Square, Warsaw
Referees: Alex Talisainen (EST), Vladimir Vesković (SRB)

=== Pool D ===
Pos	Team	Pld	W	L	PF	PA	PR	Qualification
1	Lithuania	4	4	0	81	65	1.246	Quarterfinals
2	France	4	3	1	74	72	1.028	Round of 16
3	Belgium	4	1 (Note: Head-to-head: One win, one loss, ranked by points scored.)	3	73	76	0.961	Round of 16
4	Brazil	4	1	3	72	80	0.900	
5	Puerto Rico	4	1	3	65	72	0.903	

Source: FIBA
Rules for classification: 1) Wins; 2) Head-to-head record; 3) Points scored.
Notes:

2 June 2026
13:20

Boxscore

Belgium	14–21	Lithuania
Pts: Donkor 7		Pts: Jocys 9

Parade Square, Warsaw
Referees: Najib Chajiddine (FRA), Riannan De La Torre (AUS)

2 June 2026
13:45

Boxscore

Puerto Rico	19–17 (OT)	Brazil
Pts: Gonzalez 7		Pts: Branquinho, Da Silva 6

Parade Square, Warsaw
Referees: Riannan De La Torre (AUS), Alex Talisainen (EST)

2 June 2026
15:10

Boxscore

France	21–20	Belgium
Pts: Suhard 13		Pts: Augustijnen 7

Parade Square, Warsaw
Referees: Vladimir Vesković (SRB), Alex Talisainen (EST)

2 June 2026
15:35

Boxscore

Brazil	20–22	Lithuania
Pts: Da Silva 11		Pts: Pukelis 8

Parade Square, Warsaw
Referees: Deanna Jackson (USA), Alex Talisainen (EST)

2 June 2026
17:30

Boxscore

Puerto Rico	16–18	France
Pts: Allende 8		Pts: Monceau 8

Parade Square, Warsaw
Referees: Riannan De La Torre (AUS), Vladimir Vesković (SRB)

4 June 2026
13:20

Boxscore

Brazil	20–19	Belgium
Pts: Da Silva 7		Pts: Donkor 7

Parade Square, Warsaw
Referees: Deanna Jackson (USA), Alex Talisainen (EST)

4 June 2026
13:45

Boxscore

Lithuania	17–16	Puerto Rico
Pts: Džiaugys 9		Pts: Allende, Cuascut 5

Parade Square, Warsaw
Referees: Riannan De La Torre (AUS), Vladimir Vesković (SRB)

4 June 2026
15:10

Boxscore

France	20–15	Brazil
Pts: Rambaut 8		Pts: Mello 9

Parade Square, Warsaw
Referees: Riannan De La Torre (AUS), Deanna Jackson (USA)

4 June 2026
15:35

Boxscore

Belgium	20–14	Puerto Rico
Pts: Foerts 8		Pts: González 7

Parade Square, Warsaw
Referees: Vladimir Vesković (SRB), Najib Chajiddine (FRA)

4 June 2026
17:30

Boxscore

Lithuania	21–15	France
Pts: Džiaugys, Jocys 7		Pts: Vialaret 6

Parade Square, Warsaw
Referees: Vladimir Vesković (SRB), Alex Talisainen (EST)

== Knockout stage ==
=== Bracket ===
Round of 16
5 June
Netherlands	21
Czech Republic	15
5 June
Latvia	21
New Zealand	19
5 June
Austria	21
Belgium	13
5 June
France	16
Madagascar	10

Quarter-finals
6 June
Serbia	21
Netherlands	19
6 June
Latvia	22
Lithuania	13
6 June
Germany	21
Austria	19
6 June
France	14
United States	11

Semi-finals
7 June
Serbia	19
Latvia	20
7 June
Germany	19
France	18

Final
7 June
Latvia	20
Germany	15
Third place
7 June
Serbia	20
France	19

=== Round of 16 ===
5 June 2026
19:00

Boxscore

Netherlands	21–15	Czech Republic
Pts: Van Tilborg 8		Pts: Růžička 6

Parade Square, Warsaw
Referees: Vladimir Vesković (SRB), Alex Talisainen (EST)

5 June 2026
19:25

Boxscore

Latvia	21–19	New Zealand
Pts: Miezis 10		Pts: Lewis 10

Parade Square, Warsaw
Referees: Najib Chajiddine (FRA), Riannan De La Torre (AUS)

5 June 2026
21:00

Boxscore

Austria	21–13	Belgium
Pts: Blazan 10		Pts: Augustijnen 4

Parade Square, Warsaw
Referees: Najib Chajiddine (FRA), Deanna Jackson (USA)

5 June 2026
21:25

Boxscore

France	16–10	Madagascar
Pts: Suhard 5		Pts: Randriamampionona 4

Parade Square, Warsaw
Referees: Riannan De La Torre (AUS), Vladimir Vesković (SRB)

=== Quarterfinals ===
6 June 2026
18:00

Boxscore

Serbia	21–19	Netherlands
Pts: Stojačić 9		Pts: Driessen 8

Parade Square, Warsaw
Referees: Deanna Jackson (USA), Najib Chajiddine (FRA)

6 June 2026
18:25

Boxscore

Latvia	22–13	Lithuania
Pts: Miezis 10		Pts: Pukelis 5

Parade Square, Warsaw
Referees: Riannan De La Torre (AUS), Vladimir Vesković (SRB)

6 June 2026
20:00

Boxscore

Germany	21–19	Austria
Pts: Agyeman 10		Pts: Diggs, Kaltenbrunner 7

Parade Square, Warsaw
Referees: Deanna Jackson (USA), Vladimir Vesković (SRB)

6 June 2026
20:25

Boxscore

France	14–11	United States
Pts: Suhard 8		Pts: Caruso 4

Parade Square, Warsaw
Referees: Alex Talisainen (EST), Riannan De La Torre (AUS)

=== Semifinals ===
7 June 2026
18:10

Boxscore

Serbia	19–20	Latvia
Pts: Stojačić 12		Pts: Miezis 9

Parade Square, Warsaw
Referees: Najib Chajiddine (FRA), Alex Talisainen (EST)

7 June 2026
18:40

Boxscore

Germany	19–18	France
Pts: Giessmann 10		Pts: Rambaut 8

Parade Square, Warsaw
Referees: Vladimir Vesković (SRB), Deanna Jackson (USA)

=== Third place game ===
7 June 2026
20:05

Boxscore

Serbia	20–19	France
Pts: Nerandžić 8		Pts: Suhard 7

Parade Square, Warsaw
Referees: Alex Talisainen (EST), Deanna Jackson (USA)

=== Final ===
7 June 2026
21:15

Boxscore

Latvia	20–15	Germany
Pts: Lasmanis 12		Pts: Agyeman 9

Parade Square, Warsaw
Referees: Najib Chajiddine (FRA), Vladimir Vesković (SRB)

== Final ranking ==
Rank	Team	Record
1st place, gold medalist(s)	Latvia	7–1
2nd place, silver medalist(s)	Germany	6–1
3rd place, bronze medalist(s)	Serbia	6–1
4	France	5–3
5	Lithuania	4–1
6	Netherlands	4–2
7	Austria	4–2
8	United States	3–2
9	Czech Republic	3–2
10	New Zealand	2–3
11	Madagascar	2–3
12	Belgium	1–4
13	Brazil	1–3
14	Spain	1–3
15	Mongolia	1–3
16	Puerto Rico	1–3
17	China	1–3
18	Poland	0–4
19	Australia	0–4
20	Japan	0–4

== Statistics and awards ==
=== Statistical leaders ===
Name	Points
(Latvia) Kārlis Lasmanis	56
(Germany) Denzel Agyeman	54
(Germany) Fabian Giessmann	52
(Serbia) Strahinja Stojačić	49
(France) Hugo Suhard	46

=== Awards ===
The awards were announced on 8 June 2026.

All-Star team
(Latvia) Kārlis Lasmanis
(Germany) Denzel Agyeman
(Serbia) Strahinja Stojačić
MVP
(Latvia) Kārlis Lasmanis
