= Li Haonan (basketball) =

Chinese basketball player

Li Haonan 李浩南
Personal information
- Born: 13 July 1999 (age 26); Fuyang, China
- Listed height: 1.97 m (6 ft 6 in)
- Listed weight: 97 kg (214 lb)
Medals
Men's basketball
Representing China
FIBA 3x3 Asia Cup
Bronze medal – third place	2019 Changsha
FIBA 3x3 U17 Asia Cup
Gold medal – first place	2017 Malaysia

Li Haonan (born 13 July 1999) is a Chinese basketball player for the Chinese 3x3 national team.

He represented China at the 2020 Summer Olympics.
