= Brazil men's national 3x3 team =

National 3x3 basketball team

Brazil
- FIBA ranking: 26
- Joined FIBA: 1935
- FIBA zone: FIBA Americas
- National federation: CBB
- Coach: Cristiano Medeiros

World Cup
- Appearances: 7

AmeriCup
- Appearances: 6
- Medals: (silver) 2nd (2021, 2023) (bronze) 3nd (2022, 2025)
Home	Away

The Brazilian men's national 3x3 team (Portuguese: Seleção Brasileira Masculina de 3x3) represents Brazil in international 3x3 basketball matches and is controlled by the Confederação Brasileira de Basketball (Brazilian Basketball Confederation) – abbreviated as CBB.

== Senior competitions ==
=== Summer Olympics ===
Year	Position	Pld	W	L	Players
(Japan) 2020 Tokyo	Did not qualify				
(France) 2024 Paris	Did not qualify				
Total	0/2	0	0	0	

=== World Cup ===
Year	Position	Pld	W	L
(Greece) 2012	22nd	5	0	5
(Russia) 2014	21st	5	1	4
(China) 2016	Did not enter			
(Philippines) 2018	18th	4	0	4
(Netherlands) 2019	18th	4	0	4
(Belgium) 2022 Antwerp	16th	4	1	3
(Austria) 2023 Vienna	4th	8	5	3
(Mongolia) 2025 Ulaanbaatar	Did not enter			
(Poland) 2026 Warsaw	13th	4	1	3
(Singapore) 2027	To be determined			
Total	6/11	34	8	24

=== AmeriCup ===
Year	Position	Pld	W	L
(United States) 2021 Miami	2nd place, silver medalist(s)	5	4	1
(United States) 2022 Miami	3rd place, bronze medalist(s)	5	3	2
(Puerto Rico) 2023 San Juan	2nd place, silver medalist(s)	5	3	2
(Puerto Rico) 2024 San Juan	6th	3	1	2
(Mexico) 2025 León	3rd place, bronze medalist(s)	5	4	1
(El Salvador) 2026 San Salvador	4th	5	2	3
Total	6/6	28	17	11

== Youth competitions ==
=== Youth Olympic Games ===
Year	Pos	Pld	W	L
(Singapore) 2010	Did not enter			
(China) 2014	7th	11	5	6
(Argentina) 2018	7th	5	3	2
Total	2/3	16	8	8

=== Youth World Championships ===
Year	Position	Pld	W	L
2011 Italy	Did not participate			
2012 Spain	22nd	7	2	5
2013 Indonesia	23rd	7	2	5
2015 Hungary	10th	6	3	3
2016 Kazakhstan	2nd	7	4	3
2017 China	Did not participate			
2019 Mongolia	11th	4	2	2
2021 Hungary	11th	3	1	2
2022 Hungary	10th	4	2	2
2023 Hungary	13th	4	2	2
2024 Hungary	10th	4	2	2
Total	9/11	46	20	26

== See also ==
- 3x3 basketball
- Brazil national basketball (full court) team
- Brazil women's national 3x3 team
- Brazil national under-19 basketball team
- Brazil national under-17 basketball team
