= Dylan Travis =

American basketball player (born 1993)

Personal information
- Born: May 26, 1993 (age 33) Omaha, Nebraska, U.S.
- Listed height: 6 ft 3 in (1.91 m)
- Listed weight: 195 lb (88 kg)

Career information
- High school: Daniel J. Gross (Bellevue, Nebraska)
- College: Midland (2012–2013); Iowa Central (2013–2014); Florida Southern (2014–2016)
- NBA draft: 2016: undrafted
- Playing career: 2016–present
- Position: Guard

Career history
- 2016–2017: Rot-Weiss Cuxhaven
- 2017–2018: Scanplus Baskets
- 2018: Western Port Steelers
- 2019: Waverley Falcons

Dylan Travis (born May 26, 1993) is an American basketball player who is a member of the United States men's national 3x3 team. He played college basketball at Midland, Iowa Central, and Florida Southern.

== Early life ==
Travis was born on May 26, 1993, in Omaha, Nebraska. He attended Daniel J. Gross Catholic High School where he played on the basketball team for four years and was named first-team All-State, All-Metro and to the Lincoln Journal Star's Super-State Team. He averaged 24.9 points, 5.0 assists and 8.9 rebounds as a senior and set the school records for career, single-season and single-game points, totaling 1,680 in his career. He also played baseball, football and soccer.

== College career ==
Travis began his collegiate career with the NAIA-level Midland Warriors, playing in 25 games with 7.0 points per game during the 2012–13 season. He then transferred to Iowa Central Community College in 2013 and started 28 of 32 games, recording an average of 18.3 points per game. He was the team's scoring leader and placed sixth overall in the Iowa Community College Athletic Conference (ICCAC), receiving first team All-Region and All-Region Tournament honors.

Travis transferred a second time in 2014 to the Florida Southern Moccasins, being the team's sixth man and ending the season with 11.2 points, 3.8 rebounds and 2.1 assists per game; he helped them compile an overall record of 36–1 with a national championship win over IUP, contributing 18 points in the game. He entered the 2015–16 season with a new head coach, the fourth different head coach he played under in four years. That season, he had the first triple-double in school history and ended with an average of 21.5 points per game.

== Professional career ==
Travis was eligible for the 2016 NBA draft, but was not selected. In August 2016, he signed his first professional contract with the German club Rot-Weiss Cuxhaven in the 1. Regionalliga. In one season there, he averaged 14.9 points, 5.4 rebounds and 2.9 assists per game. He joined third-tier club Scanplus Baskets in ProB for the following season, but was released not long after.

Travis signed with the Western Port Steelers of the Australian Big V for the 2018 season, where he averaged 30.5 points, 9.3 rebounds and 3.9 assists per game. In 2019, he played for the Waverley Falcons of NBL1 South, appearing in 19 games while averaging 20.2 points, 6.5 rebounds and 5.5 assists. The 2020 season was canceled due to the COVID-19 pandemic, and Travis returned home to the U.S., accepting a job as a special education teacher for Westside High School in Omaha, where he also helped coach the basketball team.

In a nine-year span of playing basketball, Travis played for nine different head coaches.

== 3x3 career ==
While at Westside, Travis was asked by a friend, Trey Bardsley, to try out 3x3 basketball. He participated in several tournaments and later was chosen as one of 16 players competing for spots on the national team for the 2020 Summer Olympics. He played for 3Ball Omaha and helped them to the national championship in 2021, then helped them re-appear in the championship in 2022.

Travis first played for the national team at the 2022 FIBA 3x3 AmeriCup, winning the gold medal over Puerto Rico. In 2023, he played for Team Miami at several events, including the USA Basketball 3X Nationals where they were undefeated until losing in the finals. He also competed for the national team at the 2023 FIBA 3x3 World Cup, winning silver, and at the 2023 Pan American Games, winning gold. In 2024, he was named as one of four players on the national team squad for the 2024 Summer Olympics, the first time the U.S. ever had a men's 3x3 Olympic basketball team, as they did not qualify in 2020.
