= Dominican Republic men's national 3x3 team =

National 3x3 basketball team

Dominican Republic
- FIBA zone: FIBA Americas
- National federation: Federación Dominicana de Baloncesto

AmeriCup
- Appearances: 6
- Medals: (bronze) Bronze (2021, 2023)

The Dominican Republic men's national 3x3 team is a national basketball team of Dominican Republic, administered by the Federación Dominicana de Baloncesto. It represents the country in international 3x3 (3 against 3) basketball competitions.

== AmeriCup record ==
Year	Position	Pld	W	L
(United States) 2021 Miami	3rd	5	3	2
(United States) 2022 Miami	5th	3	2	1
(Puerto Rico) 2023 San Juan	3rd	5	3	2
(Puerto Rico) 2024 San Juan	4th	5	2	3
(Mexico) 2025 León	8th	3	1	2
(El Salvador) 2026 San Salvador	10th	2	0	2
Total	6/6	23	11	12
