= 2022 FIBA 3x3 World Cup – Men's tournament =

2022 FIBA 3x3 World Cup
Tournament details
- Host country: Belgium
- City: Antwerp
- Dates: June 21–26
- Teams: 20

Final positions
- Champions: Serbia (5th title)
- Runners-up: Lithuania
- Third place: France
- Fourth place: Belgium

Tournament statistics
- MVP: (Serbia) Dejan Majstorović

The 2022 FIBA 3x3 World Cup was held in Antwerp, Belgium, and was contested by 20 teams.

Serbia won their fifth title with a win over Lithuania.

== Participating teams ==
All five FIBA zones were represented. The top 20 teams, including the hosts, based on the FIBA National Federation ranking qualified for the tournament.

After the exclusion of Russia due to the 2022 Russian invasion of Ukraine, Slovenia was named as the replacement team.

FIBA Africa Team Egypt (14)	FIBA Americas Team United States (5) Puerto Rico (9) Brazil (17) Chile (19)	FIBA Asia and FIBA Oceania Team Mongolia (10) Japan (15) Chinese Taipei (16) New Zealand (18) China (20)	FIBA Europe Team Serbia (1) Lithuania (2) Latvia (3) Belgium (4) {hosts} Netherlands (6) Germany (7) France (8) Poland (11) Austria (12) Slovenia (13)

== Players ==
Seed	Team	Players			
12	Austria	Nico Kaltenbrunner	Steven Kaltenbrunner	Matthias Linortner	Martin Trmal
4	Belgium	Nick Celis	Bryan De Valck	Maxime Depuydt	Thibaut Vervoort
17	Brazil	André Ferros	Renato Scholz	Fabrício Veríssimo	William Weihermann
20	China	Guo Hanyu	Li Haonan	Yan Peng	Zhu Yuanbo
16	Chinese Taipei	Chun Chiang	Han Chieh-yu	Liu Cheng-hsun	Wang Kai-yu
19	Chile	Felipe Inyaco	Jorge Schuler	Fernando Schuler	Sebastián Silva
14	Egypt	Ramy Abdallah	Ahmed Yasser Mohamed	Moaz Ayman Mohamed	Mido Taha
8	France	Léopold Cavalière	Antoine Eito	Franck Seguela	Alex Vialaret
7	Germany	Alan Boger	Kevin Bryant	Niklas Geske	Bastian Landgraf
15	Japan	Soichiro Fujitaka	Tomoya Ochiai	Ryo Sadohara	Ryuto Yasuoka
3	Latvia	Agnis Čavars	Kārlis Lasmanis	Nauris Miezis	Artūrs Strēlnieks
2	Lithuania	Gintautas Matulis	Darius Tarvydas	Marijus Užupis	Ignas Vaitkus
10	Mongolia	Ariunboldyn Anand	Davaasambuugiin Delgernyam	Enkhbatyn Dölgöön	Onolbaataryn Enkhbaatar
6	Netherlands	Julian Jaring	Arvin Slagter	Dimeo van der Horst	Jessey Voorn
18	New Zealand	Jayden Bezzant	Dom Kelman-Poto	Nikau McCullough	Tai Wynyard
11	Poland	Łukasz Diduszko	Paweł Pawłowski	Szymon Rduch	Przemysław Zamojski
9	Puerto Rico	Gilberto Clavell	Josué Erazo	TJ Fernández	Luis Hernández
1	Serbia	Marko Branković	Dejan Majstorović	Strahinja Stojačić	Mihailo Vasić
13	Slovenia	Adrian Hirschmann	Gašper Jordan Rojko	Jure Ličen	Jakob Strel
5	United States	Kidani Brutus	Khalil Iverson	Dominique Jones	James Parrott

== Preliminary round ==
The pools were announced on April 4, 2022. The schedule was released on May 12, 2022.

=== Pool A ===
Pos	Team	Pld	W	L	PF	PA	PD	Qualification	Serbia	France	New Zealand	Puerto Rico	Brazil
1	Serbia	4	4	0	86	60	+26	Quarterfinals		22–15			22–7
2	France	4	2 (Note: France 21–13 New Zealand)	2	72	65	+7	Play-in			21–13	21–14	
3	New Zealand	4	2	2	71	78	−7	Play-in	19–21			20–18	
4	Puerto Rico	4	1 (Note: Puerto Rico 20–16 Brazil)	3	71	78	−7		19–21				20–16
5	Brazil	4	1	3	57	76	−19			16–15	18–19		

Source: FIBA
Rules for classification: 1) Wins; 2) Head-to-head record; 3) Points scored.

=== Pool B ===
Pos	Team	Pld	W	L	PF	PA	PD	Qualification	Lithuania	Mongolia	Germany	Chile	Chinese Taipei for Olympic games
1	Lithuania	4	4	0	86	52	+34	Quarterfinals			21–19		22–3
2	Mongolia	4	3	1	76	64	+12	Play-in	15–21				22–15
3	Germany	4	2	2	77	63	+14	Play-in		16–19		20–16	
4	Chile	4	1	3	64	82	−18		15–22	12–20			
5	Chinese Taipei	4	0	4	45	87	−42				7–22	20–21	

Source: FIBA
Rules for classification: 1) Wins; 2) Head-to-head record; 3) Points scored.

=== Pool C ===
Pos	Team	Pld	W	L	PF	PA	PD	Qualification	Netherlands	Latvia	Poland	People's Republic of China	Japan
1	Netherlands	4	4	0	78	56	+22	Quarterfinals			19–7	21–15	
2	Latvia	4	3	1	85	41	+44	Play-in	19–21				22–5
3	Poland	4	2	2	56	69	−13	Play-in		9–22			21–13
4	China	4	1	3	57	80	−23			6–22	15–19		
5	Japan	4	0	4	51	81	−30		15–17			18–21	

Source: FIBA
Rules for classification: 1) Wins; 2) Head-to-head record; 3) Points scored.

=== Pool D ===
Pos	Team	Pld	W	L	PF	PA	PD	Qualification	Belgium	United States	Austria	Slovenia	Egypt
1	Belgium (H)	4	4	0	83	64	+19	Quarterfinals		20–18			21–12
2	United States	4	3	1	82	57	+25	Play-in			21–17	22–9	
3	Austria	4	1	3	77	72	+5	Play-in	18–21				22–8
4	Slovenia (Note: Slovenia replaced Russia.)	4	1	3	64	84	−20		16–21		22–20		
5	Egypt	4	1	3	52	81	−29			11–21		21–17	

Source: FIBA
Rules for classification: 1) Wins; 2) Head-to-head record; 3) Points scored.
(H) Hosts

== Knockout stage ==
Play-in
25 June
Latvia	21
Germany	12
25 June
Mongolia	17
Poland	20
25 June
France	19
Austria	13
25 June
United States	21
New Zealand	20

Quarter-finals
25 June
Serbia	22
Latvia	17
25 June
Poland	14
Belgium	18
25 June
France	18
Netherlands	12
25 June
United States	11
Lithuania	21

Semi-finals
26 June
Serbia	17
Belgium	12
26 June
France	17
Lithuania	18

Final
26 June
Serbia	21
Lithuania	16
Third place
26 June
Belgium	17
France (OT)	18

== Final standings ==
#	Team	Pld	W	L	PF	PA	PD
1st place, gold medalist(s)	Serbia	7	7	0	146	105	+41
2nd place, silver medalist(s)	Lithuania	7	6	1	141	101	+40
3rd place, bronze medalist(s)	France	8	5	3	144	125	+19
4th	Belgium	7	5	2	130	113	+17
Eliminated in the quarterfinals
5th	Netherlands	5	4	1	90	74	+16
6th	Latvia	6	4	2	123	75	+48
7th	United States	6	4	2	114	98	+16
8th	Poland	6	3	3	90	104	−14
Eliminated in the play-in round
9th	Mongolia	5	3	2	93	84	+9
10th	New Zealand	5	2	3	91	99	−8
11th	Germany	5	2	3	89	84	+5
12th	Austria	5	1	4	90	91	−1
Eliminated in the preliminary round
13th	Puerto Rico	4	1	3	71	78	−7
14th	Slovenia	4	1	3	64	84	−20
15th	Chile	4	1	3	64	82	−18
16th	Brazil	4	1	3	57	76	−19
17th	China	4	1	3	57	80	−23
18th	Egypt	4	1	3	52	81	−29
19th	Japan	4	0	4	51	81	−30
20th	Chinese Taipei	4	0	4	45	87	−42

== Statistics and awards ==
=== Statistical leaders ===
Name	Points
(Lithuania) Darius Tarvydas	46
(Serbia) Dejan Majstorović	44
(Lithuania) Ignas Vaitkus	44
(Serbia) Mihailo Vasić	43
(Belgium) Thibaut Vervoort	41

=== Awards ===
2022 FIBA 3x3 World Cup champion

Serbia
Fifth title

==== Individual awards ====
The awards were announced on 26 June 2022.

All-Star team
(Serbia) Dejan Majstorović
(Lithuania) Ignas Vaitkus
(Belgium) Thibaut Vervoort
MVP
(Serbia) Dejan Majstorović
