= 2019 FIBA 3x3 World Cup – Men's tournament =

2019 FIBA 3x3 World Cup

Tournament details
- Host country: Netherlands
- City: Museumplein
- Dates: June 18–23
- Teams: 20

Final positions
- Champions: United States (1st title)
- Runners-up: Latvia
- Third place: Poland
- Fourth place: Serbia

Tournament statistics
- MVP: (United States) Robbie Hummel

The 2019 FIBA 3x3 World Cup was held in Amsterdam, the Netherlands, and was contested by 20 teams.

== Participating teams ==
All FIBA continental zones except for FIBA Africa were represented. The top 20 teams, including the hosts, based on the FIBA National Federation ranking qualified for the tournament.

FIBA Americas Team United States (7) Brazil (13) Puerto Rico (20)	FIBA Asia and FIBA Oceania Team Japan (5) China (6) Mongolia (8) Qatar (10) South Korea (18) Australia (19)	FIBA Europe Team Serbia (1) Russia (2) Slovenia (3) Latvia (4) Netherlands (9) {hosts} Lithuania (11) Ukraine (12) Poland (14) France (15) Estonia (16) Turkey (17)

== Players ==
Seed	Team	Players (by rank)			
1	Serbia	Dušan Bulut	Marko Savić	Dejan Majstorović	Mihailo Vasić
2	Russia	Alexander Zuev	Aleksandr Antonikovskii	Dmitrii Cheburkin	Daniil Abramovskii
3	Slovenia	Simon Finzgar	Gašper Ovnik	Anže Srebovt	Adin Kavgić
4	Latvia	Kārlis Lasmanis	Nauris Miezis	Agnis Čavars	Edgars Krūmiņš
5	Japan	Tomoya Ochiai	Masahiro Komatsu	Daisuke Kobayashi	Ryuto Yasuoka
6	China	Zheng Yi	Li Haonan	Liu Hengyi	Huang Wenwei
7	United States	Damon Huffman	Robbie Hummel	Kareem Maddox	Canyon Barry
8	Mongolia	Enkhbatyn Dölgöön	Davaasambuugiin Delgernyam	Enkhtaivany Tserenbaatar	Tsogtyn Otgonjargal
9	Netherlands	Aron Roijé	Dimeo van der Horst	Jesper Jobse	Sjoerd van Vilsteren
10	Qatar	Fadi Abilmona	Abdulrahman Saad	Nedim Muslic	Moustafa Fouda
11	Lithuania	Marijus Uzupis	Šarūnas Vingelis	Paulius Beliavičius	Evaldas Džiaugys
12	Ukraine	Stanislav Tymofeyenko	Maksym Zakurdaiev	Oleksandr Sizov	Anton Davydiuk
13	Brazil	Felipe Camargo	Jonatas Mello	Jefferson Socas	William Weihermann
14	Poland	Michael Hicks	Paweł Pawłowski	Marcin Sroka	Przemysław Zamojski
15	France	Charly Pontens	Lucas Dussoulier	Dominique Gentil	Mickaël Var
16	Estonia	Joonas Järveläinen	Martin Dorbek	Karl Johan Lips	Rannar Raap
17	Turkey	Anıl Uğur	Yasin Canberk Uzunkaya	Serdar Hot	Özgür Şahin
18	South Korea	Kim Min-seob	Park Min-su	Park Jin-su	Lee Seung-jun
19	Australia	Tom Wright	Tim Coenraad	Andrew Steel	Greg Hire
20	Puerto Rico	Wil Martínez	Gilberto Clavell	Josué Erazo	Angel Matias

== Preliminary round ==
=== Pool A ===
Pos	Team	Pld	W	L	PF	PA	PD	Qualification	(United States)	(Serbia)	(Netherlands)	(South Korea)	(Turkey)
1	United States	4	4	0	80	41	+39	Knockout stage	—	21–16	15–14	22–8	22–3
2	Serbia	4	3	1	77	61	+16	Knockout stage	16–21	—	18–14	21–16	22–10
3	Netherlands (H)	4	2	2	72	52	+20		14–15	14–18	—	22–8	22–11
4	South Korea	4	1	3	54	77	−23		8–22	16–21	8–22	—	22–12
5	Turkey	4	0	4	36	88	−52		3–22	10–22	11–22	12–22	—

Source: FIBA
Rules for classification: 1) Wins; 2) Head-to-head record; 3) Points scored; 4) Higher seed.
(H) Hosts

=== Pool B ===
Pos	Team	Pld	W	L	PF	PA	PD	Qualification	(Ukraine)	(Puerto Rico)	(Mongolia)	(Estonia)	(Russia)
1	Ukraine	4	3 (Note: Ukraine 21–19 Puerto Rico)	1	68	70	−2	Knockout stage	—	21–19	18–17	15–13	14–21
2	Puerto Rico	4	3	1	80	72	+8	Knockout stage	19–21	—	21–18	21–18	19–15
3	Mongolia	4	2	2	69	68	+1		17–18	18–21	—	20–17	14–12
4	Estonia	4	1 (Note: Estonia 16–15 Russia)	3	64	71	−7		13–15	18–21	17–20	—	16–15
5	Russia	4	1	3	63	63	0		21–14	15–19	12–14	15–16	—

Source: FIBA
Rules for classification: 1) Wins; 2) Head-to-head record; 3) Points scored; 4) Higher seed.

=== Pool C ===
Pos	Team	Pld	W	L	PF	PA	PD	Qualification	(France)	(Slovenia)	(Qatar)	(Lithuania)	(China)
1	France	4	3 (Note: France 21–18 Slovenia)	1	81	61	+20	Knockout stage	—	21–18	21–13	17–21	22–9
2	Slovenia	4	3	1	77	71	+6	Knockout stage	18–21	—	18–17	21–20	20–13
3	Qatar	4	2 (Note: Qatar 20–16 Lithuania)	2	71	73	−2		13–21	17–18	—	20–16	21–18
4	Lithuania	4	2	2	75	71	+4		21–17	20–21	16–20	—	18–13
5	China	4	0	4	53	81	−28		9–22	13–20	18–21	13–18	—

Source: FIBA
Rules for classification: 1) Wins; 2) Head-to-head record; 3) Points scored; 4) Higher seed.

=== Pool D ===
Pos	Team	Pld	W	L	PF	PA	PD	Qualification	(Poland)	(Latvia)	(Australia)	(Japan)	(Brazil)
1	Poland	4	3 (Note: Poland 15–13 Latvia)	1	71	62	+9	Knockout stage	—	15–13	18–16	17–21	21–12
2	Latvia	4	3	1	69	62	+7	Knockout stage	13–15	—	20–16	14–11	22–20
3	Australia	4	2 (Note: Australia 22–12 Japan)	2	75	65	+10		16–18	16–20	—	22–12	21–15
4	Japan	4	2	2	57	63	−6		21–17	11–14	12–22	—	13–10
5	Brazil	4	0	4	57	77	−20		12–21	20–22	15–21	10–13	—

Source: FIBA
Rules for classification: 1) Wins; 2) Head-to-head record; 3) Points scored; 4) Higher seed.

== Knockout stage ==
Quarter-finals
United States	21
Slovenia	14
Poland	21
Puerto Rico	14
Ukraine	7
Latvia	21
France	12
Serbia	20

Semi-finals
United States	22
Poland	8
Latvia	22
Serbia	19

Final
United States	18
Latvia	14
Third place
Poland	18
Serbia	15

== Final standings ==
#	Team	Pld	W	L	PF	PA	PD
1st place, gold medalist(s)	United States	7	7	0	141	77	+64
2nd place, silver medalist(s)	Latvia	7	5	2	126	106	+20
3rd place, bronze medalist(s)	Poland	7	5	2	118	113	+5
4th	Serbia	7	4	3	131	113	+18
Eliminated in the quarterfinals
5th	Puerto Rico	5	3	2	94	93	+1
6th	France	5	3	2	93	81	+12
7th	Slovenia	5	3	2	91	92	–1
8th	Ukraine	5	3	2	75	91	–16
Eliminated in the preliminary round
9th	Lithuania	4	2	2	75	71	+4
10th	Australia	4	2	2	75	65	+10
11th	Netherlands	4	2	2	72	52	+20
12th	Qatar	4	2	2	71	73	–2
13th	Mongolia	4	2	2	69	68	+1
14th	Japan	4	2	2	57	63	–6
15th	Estonia	4	1	3	64	71	–7
16th	Russia	4	1	3	63	63	0
17th	South Korea	4	1	3	54	77	–23
18th	Brazil	4	0	4	57	77	–20
19th	China	4	0	4	53	81	–28
20th	Turkey	4	0	4	36	88	–52

== Awards ==
2019 FIBA 3x3 World Cup champion

United States
First title

=== Individual awards ===
Most Valuable Player

- (United States) Robbie Hummel (USA)

Team of the Tournament

- (United States) Robbie Hummel (USA)
- (Poland) Michael Hicks (POL)
- (Latvia) Kārlis Lasmanis (LAT)
