= Uruguay men's national 3x3 team =

National 3x3 basketball team

Uruguay
- FIBA zone: FIBA Americas

FIBA 3x3 World Championships
- Appearances: 2 (2014, 2016)
- Medals: None

The Uruguay men's national 3x3 team is a national basketball team of Uruguay, administered by the Federación Uruguaya de Básquetbol - "FUBB".

It represents the country in international 3x3 (3 against 3) basketball competitions.

== See also ==
- Uruguay women's national 3x3 team
- Uruguay men's national basketball team
