= 2024 FIBA 3x3 Europe Cup – Men's tournament qualification =

The 2024 FIBA 3x3 Europe Cup – Men's tournament qualification took place in June 2024 and decided who qualified for the 2024 FIBA 3x3 Europe Cup – Men's tournament in Vienna.

== Format ==
The hosts, defending champions automatically qualified, plus the 3 highest ranked teams not yet qualified. The other 7 spots were decided by four qualifying tournaments. Three of the tournaments (Bratislava, Bucharest and Copenhagen) had 2 spots on the line, while the Pristina qualifier was dedicated to small basketball nations and had one spot.

== Qualified teams ==
	Date	Vacancies	Qualified
Host nation	21 February 2024	1	Austria
Defending champions		1	Serbia
3x3 World Rankings		3	Lithuania; Netherlands; France
(Denmark) Copenhagen Qualifier	7–8 June	2	Spain; Croatia
(Kosovo) Pristina Qualifier	8–9 June	1	Azerbaijan
(Slovakia) Bratislava Qualifier	15–16 June	2	Germany; Switzerland
(Romania) Bucharest Qualifier	15–16 June	2	Latvia; Great Britain
Total		12	

== Copenhagen qualifier ==
The Copenhagen Qualifier took place between the 7–8 June.

Pool seeding
Pool A	Pool B
Belgium (1); Italy (4); Croatia (5); Denmark (8) (H)	Spain (2); Czech Republic (3); Hungary (6); Portugal (7)

=== Pool A ===
Pos	Team	Pld	W	L	PF	PA	PD	Qualification	(Belgium)	(Italy)	(Croatia)	(Denmark)
1	Belgium	3	3	0	57	41	+16	Semifinals		21–18		15–10
2	Italy	3	1	2	49	47	+2	Play In			11–14	20–12
3	Croatia	3	1	2	39	46	−7	Play In	13–21			
4	Denmark (H)	3	1	2	36	47	−11				14–12	

Source: FIBA
Rules for classification: 1) Wins; 2) Head-to-head record; 3) Points scored.
(H) Hosts

=== Pool B ===
Pos	Team	Pld	W	L	PF	PA	PD	Qualification	(Spain)	(Hungary)	(Czech Republic)	(Portugal)
1	Spain	3	3	0	55	43	+12	Semifinals			20–14	14–10
2	Hungary	3	1	2	56	61	−5	Play In	19–21			
3	Czech Republic	3	1	2	52	57	−5	Play In		21–16		17–21
4	Portugal	3	1	2	50	52	−2			19–21		

Source: FIBA
Rules for classification: 1) Wins; 2) Head-to-head record; 3) Points scored.

=== Knockout stage ===
==== Bracket ====
Play In
8 June
Hungary	14
Croatia	18
8 June
Italy	21
Czech Republic	14

Semifinals
8 June
Belgium	19
Croatia	20
8 June
Spain	21
Czech Republic	11

Qualified Teams
Croatia
Spain

== Bratislava qualifier ==
The Bratislava Qualifier was played between 15 and 16 June.

Pool seeding
Pool A	Pool B
Switzerland (1); Slovakia (4) (H); Ukraine (5); Bulgaria (8)	Germany (2); Poland (3); Turkey (6); Estonia (7)

=== Pool A ===
Pos	Team	Pld	W	L	PF	PA	PD	Qualification	(Bulgaria)	(Switzerland)	(Ukraine)	(Slovakia)
1	Bulgaria	3	2	1	58	55	+3	Semifinals			19–22	
2	Switzerland	3	2	1	57	44	+13	Play In	17–21			21–8
3	Ukraine	3	2	1	57	51	+6	Play In		15–19		
4	Slovakia (H)	3	0	3	37	60	−23		16–18		13–21	

Source: FIBA
Rules for classification: 1) Wins; 2) Head-to-head record; 3) Points scored.
(H) Hosts

=== Pool B ===
Pos	Team	Pld	W	L	PF	PA	PD	Qualification	(Poland)	(Germany)	(Estonia)	(Turkey)
1	Poland	3	2	1	56	55	+1	Semifinals			20–16	19–18 OT
2	Germany	3	2	1	55	44	+11	Play In	21–17		13–16	
3	Estonia	3	2	1	50	49	+1	Play In				18–16
4	Turkey	3	0	3	45	58	−13			11–21		

Source: FIBA
Rules for classification: 1) Wins; 2) Head-to-head record; 3) Points scored.

=== Knockout stage ===
==== Bracket ====
Play In
16 June
Germany	21
Ukraine	20
16 June
Switzerland	21
Estonia	16

Semifinals
16 June
Bulgaria	15
Germany	17
16 June
Switzerland	21
Poland	14

Qualified Teams
Germany
Switzerland

== Bucharest qualifier ==
The Bucharest Qualifier took place between the 15–16 June.

Pool seeding
Pool A	Pool B
Latvia (1); Slovenia (4); Romania (5) (H); Great Britain (8)	Israel (2); Montenegro (3); Greece (6); Georgia (7)

=== Pool A ===
Pos	Team	Pld	W	L	PF	PA	PD	Qualification	(Latvia)	(United Kingdom)	(Slovenia)	(Romania)
1	Latvia	3	3	0	62	36	+26	Semifinals		21–15	20–11	
2	Great Britain	3	2	1	58	53	+5	Play In				22–16
3	Slovenia	3	1	2	48	53	−5	Play In		16–21		21–12
4	Romania (H)	3	0	3	38	64	−26		10–21			

Source: FIBA
Rules for classification: 1) Wins; 2) Head-to-head record; 3) Points scored.
(H) Hosts

=== Pool B ===
Pos	Team	Pld	W	L	PF	PA	PD	Qualification	(Israel)	(Montenegro)	(Greece)	(Georgia (country))
1	Israel	3	3	0	62	39	+23	Semifinals		20–17		22–11
2	Montenegro	3	1	2	51	54	−3	Play In			21–16	13–21
3	Greece	3	1	2	48	55	−7	Play In	11–22			
4	Georgia	3	1	2	44	57	−13				12–22	

Source: FIBA
Rules for classification: 1) Wins; 2) Head-to-head record; 3) Points scored.

=== Knockout stage ===
==== Bracket ====
Play In
16 June
Montenegro	19
Slovenia	21
16 June
Great Britain	21
Greece	9

Semifinals
16 June
Latvia	21
Slovenia	9
16 June
Israel	19
Great Britain	21

Qualified Teams
Latvia
Great Britain

== Pristina qualifier ==
The Pristina Qualifier took place between the 8–9 June. The Pristina qualifier was dedicated to small basketball nations and had one spot on the line.

Pool seeding
Pool A	Pool B
Ireland (1); Luxembourg (4); Andorra (5); Malta (8)	Azerbaijan (2); Kosovo (3) (H); Cyprus (6); Albania (7); Armenia (9)

=== Pool A ===
Pos	Team	Pld	W	L	PF	PA	PD	Qualification	(Andorra)	(Republic of Ireland)	(Malta)	(Luxembourg)
1	Andorra	3	2 (Note: Andorra 21–13 Ireland)	1	47	40	+7	Semifinals		21–13		
2	Ireland	3	2	1	51	52	−1	Play In			18–17	20–14
3	Malta	3	1 (Note: Malta 15–11 Luxembourg)	2	45	46	−1	Play In	13–17			
4	Luxembourg	3	1	2	39	44	−5		14–9		11–15	

Source: FIBA
Rules for classification: 1) Wins; 2) Head-to-head record; 3) Points scored.

=== Pool B ===
Pos	Team	Pld	W	L	PF	PA	PD	Qualification	(Azerbaijan)	(Cyprus)	(Albania)	(Kosovo)	(Armenia)
1	Azerbaijan	4	4	0	77	48	+29	Semifinals			21–13	14–10	
2	Cyprus	4	3	1	80	57	+23	Play In	16–21		21–10		
3	Albania	4	2	2	65	66	−1	Play In				21–13	21–11
4	Kosovo (H)	4	1	3	57	69	−12			13–22			21–12
5	Armenia	4	0	4	45	84	−39		9–21	13–21			

Source: FIBA
Rules for classification: 1) Wins; 2) Head-to-head record; 3) Points scored.
(H) Hosts

=== Knockout stage ===
==== Bracket ====
Play In
9 June
Cyprus	21
Malta	11
9 June
Ireland	21
Albania	15

Semifinals
9 June
Andorra	19
Cyprus	22
9 June
Azerbaijan	21
Ireland	12

Final
9 June
Cyprus	18
Azerbaijan	20

== See also ==
- 2024 FIBA 3x3 Europe Cup – Women's tournament qualification
- 2024 FIBA 3x3 Europe Cup – Women's tournament
- Basketball at the 2024 Summer Olympics – Men's 3x3 tournament
- Basketball at the 2024 Summer Olympics – Women's 3x3 tournament
- 2024 FIBA 3x3 AmeriCup – Men's tournament
- 2024 FIBA 3x3 AmeriCup – Women's tournament
- 2024 FIBA 3x3 Asia Cup – Men's tournament
- 2024 FIBA 3x3 Asia Cup – Women's tournament
