= 2021 FIBA 3x3 Europe Cup qualification =

The qualification events took place in 25-26 June in Tel Aviv, Israel and 26-27 June in Constanta, Romania, respectively. Twelve men's teams and 12 women's team qualified for the final tournament. In the men's, host France, 2019 champs Serbia, Russia and Slovenia have qualified based on ranking. In the women's, host and 2019 champs France, Russia, Netherlands and Romania are automatically through. In each qualifying tournament, four men's teams and four women's teams earned spots for the final event.

== Men ==
=== Israel qualifier ===
Pool A

Pos	Team	Pld	W	L	PF	PA	PD	PCT	Qualification	(Poland)	(Turkey)	(Spain)
1	Poland	2	2	0	30	25	+5	1.000	Advance to knock-out round	—	12–9	18–16
2	Turkey	2	1	1	27	26	+1	.500	Advance to knock-out round		—	18–14
3	Spain	2	0	2	30	36	−6	.000				—

Source: FIBA
Rules for classification: 1) Winning percentage; 2) Head-to-head; 3) Points scored.

Pool B

Pos	Team	Pld	W	L	PF	PA	PD	PCT	Qualification	(Switzerland)	(Austria)	(Montenegro)	(Greece)
1	Switzerland	3	3	0	58	41	+17	1.000	Advance to knock-out round	—	20–16	17–10	21–15
2	Austria	3	2	1	57	53	+4	.667	Advance to knock-out round		—	21–16	20–17
3	Montenegro	3	1	2	46	53	−7	.333				—	20–15
4	Greece	3	0	3	47	61	−14	.000					—

Source: FIBA
Rules for classification: 1) Winning percentage; 2) Head-to-head; 3) Points scored.

Pool C

Pos	Team	Pld	W	L	PF	PA	PD	PCT	Qualification	(Israel)	(Croatia)	(Portugal)	(Czech Republic)
1	Israel	3	3	0	43	35	+8	1.000	Advance to knock-out round	—	17–13	14–11	12–11
2	Croatia	3	2	1	46	44	+2	.667	Advance to knock-out round		—	13–9	20–18
3	Portugal	3	1	2	36	38	−2	.333				—	16–11
4	Czech Republic	3	0	3	40	48	−8	.000					—

Source: FIBA
Rules for classification: 1) Winning percentage; 2) Head-to-head; 3) Points scored.

Pool D

Pos	Team	Pld	W	L	PF	PA	PD	PCT	Qualification	(Germany)	(Belgium)	(Azerbaijan)	(Andorra)
1	Germany	3	3	0	46	33	+13	1.000	Advance to knock-out round	—	12–11	21–14	13–8
2	Belgium	3	2	1	29	21	+8	.667	Advance to knock-out round		—	18–9	w-0 (f)
3	Azerbaijan	3	1	2	45	45	0	.333				—	22–6
4	Andorra	3	0	3	14	35	−21	.000					—

Source: FIBA
Rules for classification: 1) Winning percentage; 2) Head-to-head; 3) Points scored.

Knock-out round

Elimination game
A1	Poland	21
C2	Croatia	12
B1	Switzerland	11
D2	Belgium	22
C1	Israel	18
A2	Turkey	16
D1	Germany	13
B2	Austria	21

Qualifies to the final tournament

Finals

=== Romania qualifier ===
Pool A

Pos	Team	Pld	W	L	PF	PA	PD	PCT	Qualification	(Latvia)	(Belarus)	(Slovakia)
1	Latvia	2	1	1	31	30	+1	.500	Advance to knock-out round	—	17–13	14–17
2	Belarus	2	1	1	30	30	0	.500	Advance to knock-out round		—	17–13
3	Slovakia	2	1	1	30	31	−1	.500				—

Source: FIBA
Rules for classification: 1) Winning percentage; 2) Head-to-head; 3) Points scored.

Pool B

Pos	Team	Pld	W	L	PF	PA	PD	PCT	Qualification	(Lithuania)	(Romania)	(Georgia (country))	(Republic of Ireland)
1	Lithuania	3	3	0	58	35	+23	1.000	Advance to knock-out round	—	21–11	16–15	21–9
2	Romania	3	2	1	49	53	−4	.667	Advance to knock-out round		—	17–16	21–16
3	Georgia	3	1	2	50	48	+2	.333				—	19–15
4	Ireland	3	0	3	40	61	−21	.000					—

Source: FIBA
Rules for classification: 1) Winning percentage; 2) Head-to-head; 3) Points scored.

Pool C

Pos	Team	Pld	W	L	PF	PA	PD	PCT	Qualification	(Netherlands)	(Estonia)	(Cyprus)	(Sweden)
1	Netherlands	3	3	0	54	29	+25	1.000	Advance to knock-out round	—	16–15	17–7	21–7
2	Estonia	3	2	1	55	38	+17	.667	Advance to knock-out round		—	18–17	22–5
3	Cyprus	3	1	2	41	47	−6	.333				—	17–12
4	Sweden	3	0	3	24	60	−36	.000					—

Source: FIBA
Rules for classification: 1) Winning percentage; 2) Head-to-head; 3) Points scored.

Pool D

Pos	Team	Pld	W	L	PF	PA	PD	PCT	Qualification	(Ukraine)	(United Kingdom)	(Hungary)	(Kosovo)
1	Ukraine	3	3	0	53	38	+15	1.000	Advance to knock-out round	—	16–12	17–16	20–10
2	Great Britain	3	2	1	52	38	+14	.667	Advance to knock-out round		—	18–9	22–13
3	Hungary	3	1	2	46	47	−1	.333				—	21–12
4	Kosovo	3	0	3	35	63	−28	.000					—

Source: FIBA
Rules for classification: 1) Winning percentage; 2) Head-to-head; 3) Points scored.

Knock-out round

Elimination game
A1	Latvia	15
C2	Estonia	21
B1	Lithuania	21
D2	Great Britain	11
C1	Netherlands	16
A2	Belarus	13
D1	Ukraine	19
B2	Romania	7

Qualifies to the final tournament

Finals

== Women ==
=== Israel qualifier ===
Pool A

Pos	Team	Pld	W	L	PF	PA	PD	PCT	Qualification	(Poland)	(Belgium)	(Serbia)
1	Poland	2	2	0	24	22	+2	1.000	Advance to knock-out round	—	13–12	11–10
2	Belgium	2	1	1	30	30	0	.500	Advance to knock-out round		—	18–17
3	Serbia	2	0	2	27	29	−2	.000				—

Source: FIBA
Rules for classification: 1) Winning percentage; 2) Head-to-head; 3) Points scored.

Pool B

Pos	Team	Pld	W	L	PF	PA	PD	PCT	Qualification	(Portugal)	(Israel)	(Czech Republic)
1	Portugal	2	1	1	32	32	0	.500	Advance to knock-out round	—	12–20	20–12
2	Israel	2	1	1	28	25	+3	.500	Advance to knock-out round		—	8–13
3	Czech Republic	2	1	1	25	28	−3	.500				—

Source: FIBA
Rules for classification: 1) Winning percentage; 2) Head-to-head; 3) Points scored.

Pool C

Pos	Team	Pld	W	L	PF	PA	PD	PCT	Qualification	(Austria)	(Spain)	(Greece)
1	Austria	2	2	0	32	21	+11	1.000	Advance to knock-out round	—	15–13	17–8
2	Spain	2	1	1	32	27	+5	.500	Advance to knock-out round		—	19–12
3	Greece	0	0	0	20	36	−16	—				—

Source: FIBA
Rules for classification: 1) Winning percentage; 2) Head-to-head; 3) Points scored.

Pool D

Pos	Team	Pld	W	L	PF	PA	PD	PCT	Qualification	(Switzerland)	(Germany)	(Croatia)	(Turkey)
1	Switzerland	3	3	0	44	32	+12	1.000	Advance to knock-out round	—	13–11	21–13	10–8
2	Germany	3	2	1	34	22	+12	.667	Advance to knock-out round		—	9–7	14–2
3	Croatia	3	1	2	33	39	−6	.333				—	13–9
4	Turkey	3	0	3	19	37	−18	.000					—

Source: FIBA
Rules for classification: 1) Winning percentage; 2) Head-to-head; 3) Points scored.

Knock-out round

Elimination game
A1	Poland	7
C2	Spain	17
B1	Portugal	1
D2	Germany	16
C1	Austria	6
A2	Belgium	10
D1	Switzerland	18
B2	Israel	20

Qualifies to the final tournament

Finals

=== Romania qualifier ===
Pool A

Pos	Team	Pld	W	L	PF	PA	PD	PCT	Qualification	(Sweden)	(Romania)	(Republic of Ireland)
1	Sweden	2	2	0	32	21	+11	1.000	Advance to knock-out round	—	18–13	14–8
2	Romania	2	1	1	27	30	−3	.500	Already qualified according to ranking		—	14–12
3	Ireland	2	0	2	20	28	−8	.000	Advance to knock-out round			—

Source: FIBA
Rules for classification: 1) Winning percentage; 2) Head-to-head; 3) Points scored.

Pool B

Pos	Team	Pld	W	L	PF	PA	PD	PCT	Qualification	(United Kingdom)	(Hungary)	(Slovakia)
1	Great Britain	2	2	0	38	25	+13	1.000	Advance to knock-out round	—	17–12	21–13
2	Hungary	2	1	1	31	27	+4	.500	Advance to knock-out round		—	19–10
3	Slovakia	2	0	2	23	40	−17	.000				—

Source: FIBA
Rules for classification: 1) Winning percentage; 2) Head-to-head; 3) Points scored.

Pool C

Pos	Team	Pld	W	L	PF	PA	PD	PCT	Qualification	(Ukraine)	(Lithuania)	(Latvia)
1	Ukraine	2	2	0	38	17	+21	1.000	Advance to knock-out round	—	19–6	19–11
2	Lithuania	2	1	1	23	31	−8	.500	Advance to knock-out round		—	17–12
3	Latvia	2	0	2	23	36	−13	.000				—

Source: FIBA
Rules for classification: 1) Winning percentage; 2) Head-to-head; 3) Points scored.

Pool C

Pos	Team	Pld	W	L	PF	PA	PD	PCT	Qualification	(Estonia)	(Belarus)	(Kosovo)
1	Estonia	2	2	0	36	20	+16	1.000	Advance to knock-out round	—	15–12	21–8
2	Belarus	2	1	1	29	23	+6	.500	Advance to knock-out round		—	17–8
3	Kosovo	2	0	2	16	38	−22	.000				—

Source: FIBA
Rules for classification: 1) Winning percentage; 2) Head-to-head; 3) Points scored.

Knock-out round

Elimination game
A1	Sweden	11
C2	Lithuania	18
B1	Great Britain	16
D2	Belarus	14
C1	Ukraine	21
A3	Ireland	9
D1	Estonia	12
B2	Hungary	15

Qualifies to the final tournament

Finals
