= Basketball at the 2023 European Games – Men's tournament =

Tournament details
- Host country: Poland
- City: Kraków
- Dates: 21–24 June
- Teams: 16 (from 1 confederation)
- Venue(s): 1 (in 1 host city)

Final positions
- Champions: Latvia (1st title)
- Runners-up: Belgium
- Third place: Poland
- Fourth place: Germany

The men's 3x3 basketball tournament at the 2023 European Games was held in Kraków, Poland at the Cracovia Arena from 21 to 24 June 2023.

== Pools composition ==
Teams were seeded following the serpentine system according to their FIBA 3x3 Federation Ranking.

Pool A	Pool B	Pool C	Pool D
Serbia	Lithuania	Netherlands	Latvia
Germany	Austria	France	Belgium
Poland	Switzerland	Israel	Slovenia
Estonia	Romania	Czechia	Spain

== Team rosters ==
Austria	Belgium	Czechia	Estonia
Nico Kaltenbrunner; Filip Krämer; Matthias Linortner; Martin Trmal	Caspar Augustijnen; Bryan De Valck; Dennis Donkor; Thibaut Vervoort	Matěj Snopek; Michal Svoboda; Vojtěch Sýkora; Kevin Týml	Hendrik Eelmäe; Robin Kivi; Oliver Metsalu; Jaan Puidet
France	Germany	Israel	Latvia
Alexandre Aygalenq; Arthur Bruyas; Mathéo Cauwet; Clément Cavallo	Denzel Agyeman; Sidi Beikame; Niklas Geske; Philip Hecker	Ben Altit; Netanel Artzi; Tomer Assayag; Joaquin Szuchman	Kārlis Apsītis; Kristaps Gludītis; Gustavs Lācis; Zigmārs Raimo
Lithuania	Netherlands	Poland	Romania
Deividas Rasys; Ignas Razutis; Ignas Vaitkus; Vytautas Šulskis	Olusheyi Adetunji; Nesta Agasi; Luuk Slond; Norbert Thelissen	Adrian Bogucki; Szymon Rduch; Mateusz Szlachetka; Przemysław Zamojski	Christian Chițu; Alexandru Coconea; Aurelian Gavriloaia; Vladislav Solopa
Serbia	Slovenia	Spain	Switzerland
Vuk Borovićanin; Đuro Dautović; Nikola Kovačević; Marko Milaković	Adrian Hirschmann; Jure Ličen; Milorad Sedlarević; Jakob Strel	Jon Galarza; Nacho Martín; Carlos Martínez; Unai Mendicote	Marco Lehmann; Gilles Martin; Westher Molteni; Titouan Vannay

== Preliminary round ==
All times are local (UTC+2).

=== Pool A ===
Pos	Team	Pld	W	L	PF	Qualification
1	Poland (H)	3	2 (Note: Poland 1–1, Germany 1–1, Estonia 1–1, ranked by points scored.)	1	61	Quarterfinals
2	Germany	3	2	1	58	Quarterfinals
3	Estonia	3	2	1	54	
4	Serbia	3	0	3	50	

Source: EG2023
Rules for classification: 1) Wins; 2) Head-to-head record; 3) Points scored.
(H) Host
Notes:

21 June 2023
15:20

Boxscore

Serbia	16–17	Estonia
Pts: Milaković 9		Pts: Kivi, Metsalu 5

Cracovia Arena, Kraków

21 June 2023
15:45

Boxscore

Germany	21–20	Poland
Pts: Geske 8		Pts: Zamojski 10

Cracovia Arena, Kraków

21 June 2023
17:10

Boxscore

Serbia	16–19	Germany
Pts: Milaković 8		Pts: Agyeman 9

Cracovia Arena, Kraków

21 June 2023
17:35

Boxscore

Estonia	17–21	Poland
Pts: Puidet 8		Pts: Bogucki 8

Cracovia Arena, Kraków

23 June 2023
21:10

Boxscore

Germany	18–20	Estonia
Pts: Geske 9		Pts: Metsalu 11

Cracovia Arena, Kraków

23 June 2023
21:35

Boxscore

Poland	20–18 (OT)	Serbia
Pts: Bogucki 9		Pts: Milaković 7

Cracovia Arena, Kraków

=== Pool B ===
Pos	Team	Pld	W	L	PF	Qualification
1	Austria	3	3	0	64	Quarterfinals
2	Lithuania	3	2	1	62	Quarterfinals
3	Romania	3	1	2	47	
4	Switzerland	3	0	3	54	

Source: EG2023
Rules for classification: 1) Wins; 2) Head-to-head record; 3) Points scored.

21 June 2023
10:20

Boxscore

Lithuania	22–13	Romania
Pts: Vaitkus 9		Pts: Chițu, Solopa 5

Cracovia Arena, Kraków

21 June 2023
10:45

Boxscore

Austria	21–16	Switzerland
Pts: Linortner 10		Pts: Lehmann, Molteni 5

Cracovia Arena, Kraków

21 June 2023
12:10

Boxscore

Romania	21–20	Switzerland
Pts: Solopa 9		Pts: Lehmann 8

Cracovia Arena, Kraków

21 June 2023
12:35

Boxscore

Lithuania	18–22	Austria
Pts: Vaitkus 6		Pts: Kaltenbrunner, Krämer 6

Cracovia Arena, Kraków

23 June 2023
14:20

Boxscore

Austria	21–13	Romania
Pts: Linortner 11		Pts: Solopa 8

Cracovia Arena, Kraków

23 June 2023
14:45

Boxscore

Switzerland	18–22	Lithuania
Pts: Martin 8		Pts: Vaitkus 7

Cracovia Arena, Kraków

=== Pool C ===
Pos	Team	Pld	W	L	PF	Qualification
1	Czechia	3	3	0	61	Quarterfinals
2	Israel	3	2	1	58	Quarterfinals
3	France	3	1	2	54	
4	Netherlands	3	0	3	39	

Source: EG2023
Rules for classification: 1) Wins; 2) Head-to-head record; 3) Points scored.

22 June 2023
19:20

Boxscore

Netherlands	16–21	Czechia
Pts: Thelissen 8		Pts: Svoboda 9

Cracovia Arena, Kraków

22 June 2023
19:45

Boxscore

France	18–20 (OT)	Israel
Pts: Aygalenq 7		Pts: Altit 6

Cracovia Arena, Kraków

22 June 2023
21:10

Boxscore

Czechia	19–16	Israel
Pts: Svoboda 9		Pts: Artzi 8

Cracovia Arena, Kraków

22 June 2023
21:35

Boxscore

Netherlands	15–19	France
Pts: Adetunji 6		Pts: Aygalenq 9

Cracovia Arena, Kraków

23 June 2023
19:20

Boxscore

France	17–21	Czechia
Pts: Cauwet 8		Pts: Svoboda 8

Cracovia Arena, Kraków

23 June 2023
19:45

Boxscore

Israel	22–8	Netherlands
Pts: Artzi 10		Pts: Thelissen 4

Cracovia Arena, Kraków

=== Pool D ===
Pos	Team	Pld	W	L	PF	Qualification
1	Latvia	3	2 (Note: Belgium 16–21 Latvia)	1	60	Quarterfinals
2	Belgium	3	2	1	58	Quarterfinals
3	Spain	3	1 (Note: Slovenia 17–21 Spain)	2	47	
4	Slovenia	3	1	2	46	

Source: EG2023
Rules for classification: 1) Wins; 2) Head-to-head record; 3) Points scored.
Notes:

22 June 2023
14:20

Boxscore

Belgium	21–8	Slovenia
Pts: Donkor 14		Pts: Ličen 3

Cracovia Arena, Kraków

22 June 2023
14:45

Boxscore

Latvia	21–12	Spain
Pts: Lācis 10		Pts: Mendicote 4

Cracovia Arena, Kraków

22 June 2023
16:10

Boxscore

Slovenia	17–21	Spain
Pts: Ličen 6		Pts: Mendicote 8

Cracovia Arena, Kraków

22 June 2023
16:35

Boxscore

Belgium	16–21	Latvia
Pts: Donkor 11		Pts: Gludītis 9

Cracovia Arena, Kraków

23 June 2023
16:10

Boxscore

Latvia	18–21	Slovenia
Pts: Gludītis 7		Pts: Hirschmann 12

Cracovia Arena, Kraków

23 June 2023
16:35

Boxscore

Spain	14–21	Belgium
Pts: Martínez 11		Pts: Vervoort 10

Cracovia Arena, Kraków

== Knockout round ==
=== Bracket ===
Quarterfinals
24 June
Poland	21
Israel	13
24 June
Latvia	21
Lithuania	18
24 June
Austria	20
Belgium	21
24 June
Czechia	13
Germany	22

Semifinals
24 June
Poland	19
Latvia	21
24 June
Belgium	21
Germany	15

Final
24 June
Latvia	19
Belgium	11
Third place
24 June
Poland	21
Germany	18

=== Quarterfinals ===
24 June 2023
14:20

Boxscore

Poland	21–13	Israel
Pts: Bogucki 12		Pts: Artzi 5

Cracovia Arena, Kraków

24 June 2023
14:45

Boxscore

Latvia	21–18	Lithuania
Pts: Gludītis 9		Pts: Rasys 10

Cracovia Arena, Kraków

24 June 2023
16:10

Boxscore

Austria	20–21	Belgium
Pts: Kaltenbrunner 9		Pts: Vervoort 15

Cracovia Arena, Kraków

24 June 2023
16:35

Boxscore

Czechia	13–22	Germany
Pts: Svoboda 7		Pts: Geske, Hecker 7

Cracovia Arena, Kraków

=== Semifinals ===
24 June 2023
19:20

Boxscore

Poland	19–21	Latvia
Pts: Bogucki 7		Pts: Lācis 8

Cracovia Arena, Kraków

24 June 2023
19:45

Boxscore

Belgium	21–15	Germany
Pts: Vervoort 12		Pts: Geske 6

Cracovia Arena, Kraków

=== Bronze medal game ===
24 June 2023
20:45

Boxscore

Poland	21–18	Germany
Pts: Bogucki 10		Pts: Agyeman, Hecker 6

Cracovia Arena, Kraków

=== Final ===
24 June 2023
21:35

Boxscore

Latvia	19–11	Belgium
Pts: Apsītis 8		Pts: Donkor 5

Cracovia Arena, Kraków

== See also ==
- Basketball at the 2023 European Games – Women's tournament
