= 2024 FIBA 3x3 Europe Cup =

Tournament details
- Host country: Austria
- City: Vienna
- Dates: 22–25 August
- Venue: Kaiserwiese

The 2024 FIBA 3x3 Europe Cup was the ninth edition of the continental championship. The event was held on the Kaiserwiese in the Austrian capital, Vienna.

Serbia were the men's defending champions and Netherlands were the women's defending champions.

== Host selection ==
Vienna, Austria, was given the hosting rights on 21 February 2024. This marks the second time that Austria is hosting the event after Graz hosted the competition in 2022.

== Venue ==
The venue was at the Kaiserwiese in Vienna.

== Qualification ==
=== Men ===
	Date	Vacancies	Qualified
Host nation	21 February 2024	1	Austria
Defending champions		1	Serbia
3x3 World Rankings		3	Lithuania; Netherlands; France
(Denmark) Copenhagen Qualifier	7–8 June	2	Spain; Croatia
(Kosovo) Pristina Qualifier	8–9 June	1	Azerbaijan
(Slovakia) Bratislava Qualifier	15–16 June	2	Germany; Switzerland
(Romania) Bucharest Qualifier	15–16 June	2	Latvia; Great Britain
Total		12	

=== Women ===
	Date	Vacancies	Qualified
Host nation	21 February 2024	1	Austria
Defending champions		1	Netherlands
3x3 World Rankings		3	France; Germany; Hungary
(Denmark) Copenhagen Qualifier	7–8 June	2	Spain; Italy
(Kosovo) Pristina Qualifier	8–9 June	1	Azerbaijan
(Slovakia) Bratislava Qualifier	15–16 June	2	Ukraine; Poland
(Romania) Bucharest Qualifier	15–16 June	2	Romania; Latvia
Total		12	

== Medalists ==
Event	Gold	Silver	Bronze
Men's team	Austria; Toni Blazan; Nico Kaltenbrunner; Enis Murati; Fabio Söhnel	Serbia; Nemanja Barać; Marko Branković; Stefan Kojić; Strahinja Stojačić	Lithuania; Gabrielius Čelka; Titas Januševičius; Aurelijus Pukelis; Marijus Užupis
Women's team	Spain; Gracia Alonso; Juana Camilión; Vega Gimeno; Sandra Ygueravide	France; Noémie Brochant; Camille Droguet; Marie-Michelle Milapie; Marie-Eve Paget	Netherlands; Loyce Bettonvil; Janis Boonstra; Noortje Driessen; Kiki Fleuren

== Men's tournament ==
Quarter-finals
August 24
Spain	16
Austria	21
August 24
France	16
Lithuania	21
August 24
Switzerland	21
Great Britain	10
August 24
Netherlands	16
Serbia	21

Semi-finals
August 25
Austria	21
Lithuania	14
August 25
Switzerland	10
Serbia	21

Final
August 25
Austria	18
Serbia	17
Bronze medal
August 25
Lithuania	21
Switzerland	18

== Women's tournament ==
Quarter-finals
August 24
France	21
Austria	14
August 24
Netherlands	20
Germany	15
August 24
Poland	19
Latvia	17
August 24
Spain	18
Ukraine	15

Semi-finals
August 25
France	18
Netherlands	17
August 25
Poland	11
Spain	21

Final
August 25
France	11
Spain	19
Bronze medal
August 25
Netherlands	21
Poland	14
