= Basketball at the 2024 Summer Olympics – Men's 3x3 qualification =

The men's 3x3 qualification for the Olympic basketball tournament took place between November 2022 and June 2024, allocating eight teams for the final tournament.

Three quota places were awarded to the top-ranked teams, including the host nation France, based on the total points calculated in the FIBA 3x3 Rankings of 1 November 2023, with the remainder attributed to the eligible National Olympic Committees (NOCs) in separate wildcard tournaments (two winners of the universality-driven Olympic qualifying tournaments and the top three of the FIBA Olympic Qualifying Tournament).

== Method ==
Eight teams participated in the men's basketball tournament, with each NOC sending a roster of three players and a substitute.

=== Host nation ===
As the host nation, France reserved a quota place in the men's 3x3 basketball subject to the FIBA 3x3 Ranking of 1 November 2023. If the host country failed to enter the team within the ranking list, the number of teams qualified through the regular process would be increased accordingly.

=== Qualification via world rankings ===
Similar to the 2021 format, the top three teams (two if France obtained the host quota place in the men's tournament) on the FIBA 3x3 men's basketball ranking list on 1 November 2023, qualified for the Olympics. These rankings were also used to determine entrants to both the OQT and UOQT.

=== Qualification via the wild card tournaments ===
The five remaining quota places were attributed to the eligible NOCs, including the host nation France if unqualified, through three separate wildcard tournaments: two universality-driven Olympic qualifying tournaments (UOQT) and the FIBA Olympic qualifying tournament (OQT). Teams were selected based on the following criteria:

- UOQT 1 – The top eight eligible NOCs, including the tournament host, from the FIBA world ranking list, participated in the first leg of the UOQT with the winner obtaining a direct spot for Paris 2024.
- UOQT 2 – The highest-ranked eligible NOC in the standings from each of the 2023 FIBA Continental Cup (Asia and Oceania, Americas, Europe, and Africa), the tournament host vying for qualification, and the host nation France, if unqualified, participated in the second leg of the UOQT with the winner obtaining a direct spot for Paris 2024. If the eight-team roster remained vacant, teams would be selected from a maximum of eight highest-ranked eligible NOCs based on the standings from 2023 FIBA 3x3 World Cup.
- OQT – The sixteen highest-ranked eligible NOCs based on the FIBA global standings, including the tournament host and host nation France, if unqualified, participated in the FIBA OQT with the top three securing the remaining berths for Paris 2024. The sixteen-team roster in the OQT had to field a minimum of two NOCs to a maximum of ten from the same continental zone (Asia and Oceania, Americas, Europe, and Africa).

== Qualified teams ==
Qualification method	Date	Venue	Berths	Qualified team
Host nation	—N/a	—N/a	0	—N/a
FIBA 3x3 World Ranking	1 November 2023	—N/a	3	Serbia; United States; China
2024 FIBA Universality Olympic Qualifying Tournament 1	12–14 April 2024	Hong Kong	1	Latvia
2024 FIBA Universality Olympic Qualifying Tournament 2	3–5 May 2024	(Japan) Utsunomiya	1	Netherlands
2024 FIBA Olympic Qualifying Tournament	16–19 May 2024	(Hungary) Debrecen	3	France; Lithuania; Poland
Total			8	

== FIBA Universality-driven Olympic Qualifying Tournament 1 (UOQT1) ==
The tournament was held in Hong Kong between 12 and 14 April 2024. The pools were revealed on 22 January 2024.

=== Qualified teams ===
Qualification method	Date	Venue	Berths	Qualified team
UOQT hosts	22 December 2023	—	1	Hong Kong
FIBA 3x3 World Rankings	1 November 2023	—	7	Netherlands; Mongolia; Latvia; Austria; Switzerland; Egypt; New Zealand
Total			8	

=== Preliminary round ===
==== Pool A ====
Pos	Team	Pld	W	L	PF	PA	PD	Qualification	Austria	Netherlands	Switzerland	Hong Kong
1	Austria	3	2	1	57	46	+11	Semifinals			18–19	21–10
2	Netherlands	3	2	1	56	44	+12	Semifinals	17–18			17–11
3	Switzerland	3	2	1	55	59	−4			15–22		
4	Hong Kong (H)	3	0	3	40	59	−19				19–21	

Source: FIBA
Rules for classification: 1) Wins; 2) Points scored; 3) Head-to-head record.
(H) Hosts

==== Pool B ====
Pos	Team	Pld	W	L	PF	PA	PD	Qualification	Latvia	New Zealand	Egypt	Mongolia
1	Latvia	3	3	0	63	38	+25	Semifinals		21–10	21–12	
2	New Zealand	3	2	1	39	44	−5	Semifinals			17–13	
3	Egypt	3	1	2	45	56	−11					20–18
4	Mongolia	3	0	3	44	53	−9		16–21	10–12		

Source: FIBA
Rules for classification: 1) Wins; 2) Points scored; 3) Head-to-head record.

=== Bracket ===
Semi-finals
14 April
Austria	20
New Zealand	18
14 April
Latvia (OT)	15
Netherlands	14

Final
14 April
Austria	14
Latvia	19

== FIBA Universality-driven Olympic Qualifying Tournament 2 (UOQT2) ==
The tournament was held in Utsunomiya, Japan between 3 and 5 May 2024. The pools were revealed on 22 January 2024.

=== Qualified teams ===
Qualification method		Date	Venue	Berths	Qualified team
UOQT hosts		29 November 2023	—	1	Japan
2023 FIBA 3x3 Continental Cup	Africa	1–3 December 2023	(Egypt) Cairo	1	Egypt
2023 FIBA 3x3 Continental Cup	Americas	1–3 December 2023	(Puerto Rico) San Juan	1	Puerto Rico
2023 FIBA 3x3 Continental Cup	Asia and Oceania	29 March – 2 April 2023	Singapore	1	Mongolia
2023 FIBA 3x3 Continental Cup	Europe	5–7 September 2023	(Israel) Jerusalem	1	Lithuania
2024 Olympics hosts		—N/a	—N/a	1	France
2023 FIBA 3x3 World Cup		30 May – 4 June 2023	(Austria) Vienna	2	Brazil; Netherlands
Total				8	

=== Preliminary round ===
==== Pool A ====
Pos	Team	Pld	W	L	PF	PA	PD	Qualification	Netherlands	Lithuania	Puerto Rico	Brazil
1	Netherlands	3	3	0	64	49	+15	Semifinals			21–16	22–15
2	Lithuania	3	2	1	60	47	+13	Semifinals	18–21			21–14
3	Puerto Rico	3	1	2	49	61	−12			12–21		
4	Brazil	3	0	3	48	64	−16				19–21	

Source: FIBA
Rules for classification: 1) Wins; 2) Points scored; 3) Head-to-head record.

==== Pool B ====
Pos	Team	Pld	W	L	PF	PA	PD	Qualification	France	Mongolia	Japan	Egypt
1	France	3	2	1	59	39	+20	Semifinals		17–21		21–8
2	Mongolia	3	2	1	54	56	−2	Semifinals			12–22	21–17
3	Japan (H)	3	2	1	53	53	0		10–21			
4	Egypt	3	0	3	45	63	−18				20–21	

Source: FIBA
Rules for classification: 1) Wins; 2) Points scored; 3) Head-to-head record.
(H) Hosts

=== Bracket ===
Semi-finals
5 May
Netherlands	21
Mongolia	11
5 May
France	15
Lithuania	21

Final
5 May
Netherlands	19
Lithuania	15

== FIBA Olympic Qualifying Tournament (OQT) ==
The tournament was held in Debrecen, Hungary between 16 and 19 May 2024. The pools were revealed on 22 January 2024.

=== Qualified teams ===
Qualification method	Date	Venue	Berths	Qualified team
OQT hosts	29 November 2023	—	1	Hungary
FIBA 3x3 World Rankings	1 November 2023	—	15	France; Egypt; Madagascar; Puerto Rico; Canada; Mongolia; Japan; Lithuania; Belgium; Austria; Switzerland; Germany; Poland; Spain; Israel
Total			16	

=== Preliminary round ===
==== Pool A ====
Pos	Team	Pld	W	L	PF	PA	PD	Qualification	Germany	Lithuania	Madagascar	Switzerland
1	Germany	3	2 (Note: Germany 18–16 Lithuania)	1	53	51	+2	Quarterfinals		18–16		
2	Lithuania	3	2	1	58	49	+9	Quarterfinals			21–13	21–18
3	Madagascar	3	1 (Note: Switzerland 16–21 Madagascar)	2	50	54	−4		16–17			
4	Switzerland	3	1	2	53	60	−7		19–18		16–21	

Source: FIBA
Rules for classification: 1) Wins; 2) Head-to-head record; 3) Points scored.

==== Pool B ====
Pos	Team	Pld	W	L	PF	PA	PD	Qualification	Austria	Israel	Puerto Rico	Hungary
1	Austria	3	2 (Note: Israel 16–19 Austria)	1	54	50	+4	Quarterfinals			14–21	21–13
2	Israel	3	2	1	55	46	+9	Quarterfinals	16–19			21–14
3	Puerto Rico	3	1 (Note: Hungary 21–19 Puerto Rico)	2	53	53	0			13–18		
4	Hungary (H)	3	1	2	48	61	−13				21–19	

Source: FIBA
Rules for classification: 1) Wins; 2) Head-to-head record; 3) Points scored.
(H) Hosts

==== Pool C ====
Pos	Team	Pld	W	L	PF	PA	PD	Qualification	Spain	France	Egypt	Canada
1	Spain	3	2 (Note: France 18–20 Spain)	1	52	49	+3	Quarterfinals			18–13	14–18
2	France	3	2	1	60	44	+16	Quarterfinals	18–20		21–13	
3	Egypt	3	1 (Note: Egypt 21–18 Canada)	2	47	57	−10					21–18
4	Canada	3	1	2	47	56	−9			11–21		

Source: FIBA
Rules for classification: 1) Wins; 2) Head-to-head record; 3) Points scored.

==== Pool D ====
Pos	Team	Pld	W	L	PF	PA	PD	Qualification	Mongolia	Poland	Japan	Belgium
1	Mongolia	3	3	0	62	49	+13	Quarterfinals		21–14		21–17
2	Poland	3	2	1	55	60	−5	Quarterfinals			21–20	
3	Japan	3	1	2	59	60	−1		18–20			
4	Belgium	3	0	3	55	62	−7			19–20	19–21	

Source: FIBA
Rules for classification: 1) Wins; 2) Head-to-head record; 3) Points scored.

=== Bracket ===
Quarter-finals
19 May
Germany	17
France (OT)	19
19 May
Mongolia	15
Israel	12
19 May
Austria	19
Poland	21
19 May
Spain	9
Lithuania	21

Semi-finals
19 May
France	21
Mongolia	20
19 May
Poland	15
Lithuania	21

Final
19 May
France	Q
Lithuania	Q
Third place
19 May
Mongolia	20
Poland (OT)	22

Note: By winning their semi-final matches both France and Lithuania qualified for the Olympics, thus the final match was not played.
