= FIBA 3x3 U17 Europe Cup =

Basketball competition

- Sport: 3x3 basketball
- Founded: 2015
- No. of teams: 24
- Country: FIBA Europe members
- Continent: Europe
- Most titles: M: eight teams (1 title); W: France (3 titles)

The FIBA 3x3 U17 Europe Cup (or FIBA 3x3 U18 Europe Cup until 2021) is an under-17/under-18 3x3 basketball competition between FIBA Europe members.

== History ==
The event was held for the first time in Minsk, Belarus in 2015 and has been held annually ever since.

In the championship there are 2 events, men's and women's. Each team has 4 players (3 on court, 1 bench), aged fewer than 18 years. The match is played on a half court and every rule applies as well as a 12-second shot clock and clearance needed on a new possession.

== Results ==
=== Men's tournament ===
| Year | Host | Final | | | Third Place Match | | |
| Year | Host | Champion | Score | Second Place | Third Place | Score | Fourth Place |
|---|---|---|---|---|---|---|---|
| 2015; Details | (Belarus); Minsk | Turkey | 16–14 | France | Spain | 18–15 | Belarus |
| 2016; Details | (Hungary); Debrecen | France | 19–15 | Belgium | Turkey | 18–17 | Andorra |
| 2017; Details | (Hungary); Debrecen | Belgium | 19–13 | Netherlands | France | 21–9 | Spain |
| 2018; Details | (Hungary); Debrecen | Hungary | 20–18 | Serbia | Spain | 21–12 | Romania |
| 2019; Details | (Georgia (country)); Tbilisi | Lithuania | 21–14 | France | Israel | 21–18 | Ukraine |
| 2021; Details | (Portugal); Lisbon | Slovenia | 19–14 | Ukraine | Hungary | 16–12 | Portugal |
| 2022; Details | (Greece); Athens | Germany | 21–20 | Latvia | France | 21–14 | Israel |
| 2023; Details | (Greece); Heraklion | Croatia | 21–19 | Spain | France | W/O | Israel |

=== Women's tournament ===
| Year | Host | Final | | | Third Place Match | | |
| Year | Host | Champion | Score | Second Place | Third Place | Score | Fourth Place |
|---|---|---|---|---|---|---|---|
| 2015; Details | (Belarus); Minsk | Hungary | 16–15 | Belarus | Israel | 16–12 | France |
| 2016; Details | (Hungary); Debrecen | France | 11–10 | Hungary | Czech Republic | 17–14 | Russia |
| 2017; Details | (Hungary); Debrecen | Hungary | 12–9 | Russia | Netherlands | 16–12 | Poland |
| 2018; Details | (Hungary); Debrecen | Belgium | 12–4 | France | Russia | 15–14 | Spain |
| 2019; Details | (Georgia (country)); Tbilisi | Spain | 17–16 | Germany | Russia | 17–16 | France |
| 2021; Details | (Portugal); Lisbon | Spain | 15–7 | Germany | Belarus | 15–10 | Ukraine |
| 2022; Details | (Greece); Athens | France | 13–12 | Spain | Poland | 12–11 | Netherlands |
| 2023; Details | (Greece); Heraklion | France | 13–10 | Spain | Germany | 19–14 | Bulgaria |

== Statistics ==
=== Medal table ===
| Rank | Nation | Gold | Silver | Bronze | Total |
|---|---|---|---|---|---|
| 1 | France | 4 | 3 | 3 | 10 |
| 2 | Hungary | 3 | 1 | 1 | 5 |
| 3 | Spain | 2 | 3 | 2 | 7 |
| 4 | Belgium | 2 | 1 | 0 | 3 |
| 5 | Germany | 1 | 2 | 1 | 4 |
| 6 | Turkey | 1 | 0 | 1 | 2 |
| 7 | Croatia | 1 | 0 | 0 | 1 |
| 7 | Lithuania | 1 | 0 | 0 | 1 |
| 7 | Slovenia | 1 | 0 | 0 | 1 |
| 10 | Russia | 0 | 1 | 2 | 3 |
| 11 | Belarus | 0 | 1 | 1 | 2 |
| 11 | Netherlands | 0 | 1 | 1 | 2 |
| 13 | Latvia | 0 | 1 | 0 | 1 |
| 13 | Serbia | 0 | 1 | 0 | 1 |
| 13 | Ukraine | 0 | 1 | 0 | 1 |
| 16 | Israel | 0 | 0 | 2 | 2 |
| 17 | Czech Republic | 0 | 0 | 1 | 1 |
| 17 | Poland | 0 | 0 | 1 | 1 |
| Totals (18 entries) | | 16 | 16 | 16 | 48 |

== See also ==
- FIBA 3x3 Europe Cup
- FIBA 3x3 U18 World Cup
