= 3x3 basketball at the 2026 Mediterranean Games – Men's tournament =

Men's 3x3 basketball at the 2026 Mediterranean Games
- Venue: Giardini Peripato
- Location: Taranto
- Dates: 29 August – 1 September
- Nations: 16

Medalists
gold medal	Spain
silver medal	Italy
bronze medal	Algeria

Men's 3x3 basketball tournament at the 2026 Mediterranean Games was held from 29 August to 1 September at the Giardini Peripato, in Taranto, Italy.

== Preliminary round ==
All times are local (UTC+2).

=== Group A ===
Pos	Team	Pld	W	L	PF	PA	PD	Qualification
1	Algeria	3	3	0	57	50	+7	Quarterfinals
2	Croatia	3	2	1	56	40	+16	Quarterfinals
3	Slovenia	3	1	2	49	49	0	
4	Cyprus	3	0	3	31	54	−23	

Source: Taranto 2026
Rules for classification: 1) Wins; 2) Head-to-head record; 3) Points scored.

29 August
10:05

Report

Algeria	17–12	Cyprus

Giardini Peripato, Taranto

29 August
10:30

Report

Croatia	18–12	Slovenia

Giardini Peripato, Taranto

29 August
16:35

Report

Cyprus	11–18	Slovenia

Giardini Peripato, Taranto

29 August
18:25

Report

Algeria	20–19	Croatia

Giardini Peripato, Taranto

30 August
10:35

Report

Croatia	19–8	Cyprus

Giardini Peripato, Taranto

30 August
18:25

Report

Slovenia	19–20	Algeria

Giardini Peripato, Taranto

=== Group B ===
Pos	Team	Pld	W	L	PF	PA	PD	Qualification
1	France	3	3	0	35	28	+7	Quarterfinals
2	Greece	3	2	1	35	37	−2	Quarterfinals
3	Egypt	3	1	2	31	36	−5	
4	North Macedonia	3	0	3	0	0	0	

Source: Taranto 2026
Rules for classification: 1) Wins; 2) Head-to-head record; 3) Points scored.

29 August
19:25

France	vs.	North Macedonia

Giardini Peripato, Taranto

29 August
19:25

Report

Greece	21–17	Egypt

Giardini Peripato, Taranto

30 August
10:05

North Macedonia	vs.	Egypt

Giardini Peripato, Taranto

30 August
10:05

Report

France	20–14	Greece

Giardini Peripato, Taranto

30 August
17:00

Greece	vs.	North Macedonia

Giardini Peripato, Taranto

30 August
17:00

Report

Egypt	14–15	France

Giardini Peripato, Taranto

=== Group C ===
Pos	Team	Pld	W	L	PF	PA	PD	Qualification
1	Turkey	3	3	0	37	26	+11	Quarterfinals
2	Portugal	3	2	1	32	28	+4	Quarterfinals
3	Kosovo	3	1	2	23	38	−15	
4	Serbia	3	0	3	0	0	0	

Source: Taranto 2026
Rules for classification: 1) Wins; 2) Head-to-head record; 3) Points scored.

29 August
10:55

Serbia	vs.	Kosovo

Giardini Peripato, Taranto

29 August
10:55

Report

Turkey	16–15	Portugal

Giardini Peripato, Taranto

29 August
17:00

Report

Kosovo	12–17	Portugal

Giardini Peripato, Taranto

29 August
18:50

Serbia	vs.	Turkey

Giardini Peripato, Taranto

30 August
10:55

Report

Turkey	21–11	Kosovo

Giardini Peripato, Taranto

30 August
19:15

Portugal	vs.	Serbia

Giardini Peripato, Taranto

=== Group D ===
Pos	Team	Pld	W	L	PF	PA	PD	Qualification
1	Italy (H)	3	3	0	61	48	+13	Quarterfinals
2	Spain	3	1	2	55	49	+6	Quarterfinals
3	Tunisia	3	1	2	51	57	−6	
4	Bosnia and Herzegovina	3	1	2	43	56	−13	

Source: Taranto 2026
Rules for classification: 1) Wins; 2) Head-to-head record; 3) Points scored.
(H) Hosts

29 August
20:15

Report

Spain	21–11	Bosnia and Herzegovina

Giardini Peripato, Taranto

29 August
21:15

Report

Italy	21–18	Tunisia

Giardini Peripato, Taranto

30 August
18:50

Report

Bosnia and Herzegovina	22–15	Tunisia

Giardini Peripato, Taranto

30 August
19:50

Report

Spain	19–20	Italy

Giardini Peripato, Taranto

30 August
20:40

Report

Tunisia	18–15	Spain

Giardini Peripato, Taranto

30 August
21:40

Report

Italy	20–11	Bosnia and Herzegovina

Giardini Peripato, Taranto

== Elimination round ==
=== Bracket ===
Championship bracket

Quarterfinals
31 August
Algeria	18
Portugal	17
31 August
Italy	17
Greece	11
31 August
France	15
Spain	21
31 August
Turkey	18
Croatia	16

Semifinals
1 September
Algeria	13
Italy	15
1 September
Spain	21
Turkey	15

Gold medal
1 September
Italy	18
Spain (OT)	20
Bronze medal
1 September
Algeria (OT)	21
Turkey	19

=== Quarterfinals ===
31 August
18:35

Report

Algeria	18–17	Portugal

Giardini Peripato, Taranto

31 August
19:00

Report

Italy	17–11	Greece

Giardini Peripato, Taranto

31 August
20:35

Report

France	15–21	Spain

Giardini Peripato, Taranto

31 August
21:00

Report

Turkey	18–16	Croatia

Giardini Peripato, Taranto

=== Semifinals ===
1 September
17:50

Report

Algeria	13–15	Italy

Giardini Peripato, Taranto

1 September
18:15

Report

Spain	21–18	Turkey

Giardini Peripato, Taranto

=== Bronze medal game ===
1 September
19:20

Report

Algeria	21–19 (OT)	Turkey

Giardini Peripato, Taranto

=== Gold medal game ===
1 September
20:30

Report

Italy	18–20 (OT)	Spain

Giardini Peripato, Taranto

== Final standings ==
Rank	Team	Record
1st place, gold medalist(s)	Spain	4–2
2nd place, silver medalist(s)	Italy	5–1
3rd place, bronze medalist(s)	Algeria	5–1
4	Turkey	4–2
5	France	3–1
6	Croatia	2–2
7	Portugal	2–2
8	Greece	2–2
9	Tunisia	1–2
10	Slovenia	1–2
11	Egypt	1–2
12	Bosnia and Herzegovina	1–2
13	Kosovo	1–2
14	Cyprus	0–3
WDR	North Macedonia	0–3
WDR	Serbia	0–3
