= Best Young Player Award =

Best Young Player Award may refer to:

== Association football ==
- Kopa Trophy, presented to the best performing player under 21
- Golden Boy, presented to the best performing young male footballer in Europe
- FIFA World Cup Young Player Award, FIFA World Cup for best young player of tournament
- FIFA Women's World Cup Young Player Award, FIFA Women's World Cup for best young player of tournament
- PFA Young Player of the Year
- Premier League Young Player of the Season
- Serie A Young Footballer of the Year
- Ligue 1 Young player of the year
- MLS Young Player of the Year Award
- K League Young Player of the Year Award
- J.League Best Young Player
- A-League Men Young Footballer of the Year
- A-League Women Young Footballer of the Year

== Basketball ==
- ACB Best Young Player Award
- LNB Pro A Best Young Player
- KML Best Young Player Award
- PLK Best Young Player
