= 2014 FIBA Europe 3x3 Championships =

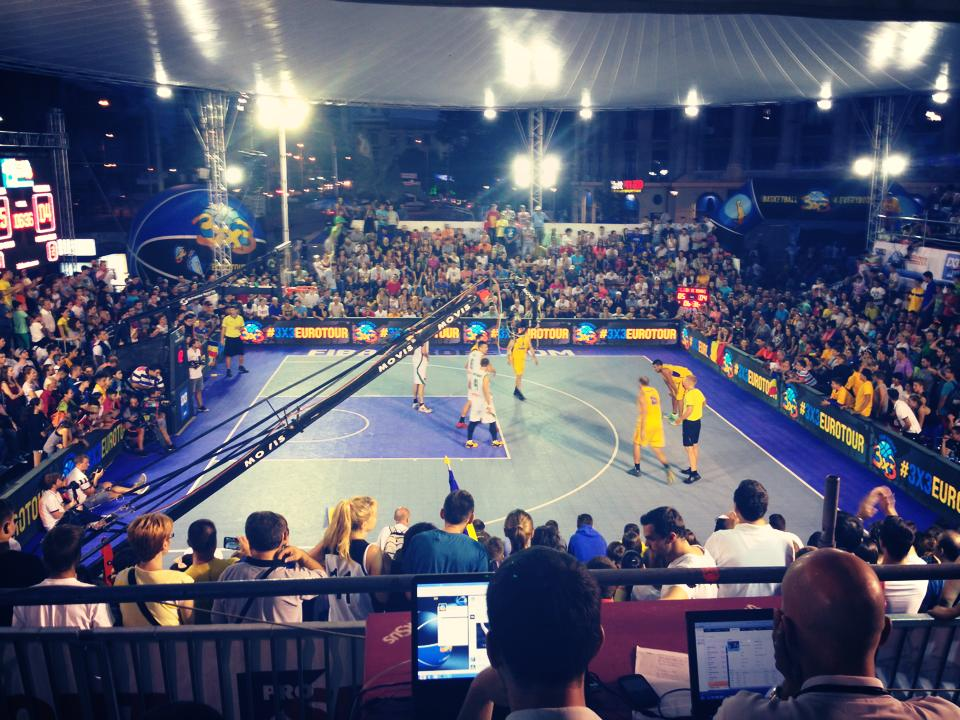
- Match during the championships

Tournament information
- Location: University Square, Bucharest
- Dates: 5–7 September 2014
- Host: Romania

The 2014 FIBA Europe 3x3 Championships, hosted at the University Square in Bucharest, Romania, was the inaugural European 3x3 basketball event that featured separate competitions for men's and women's national teams. The tournament was held from 5 to 7 September 2014.

In the final of the men's tournament, host Romania beat Slovenia to win their first European championship title. In the final of the women's tournament, Russia also beat Slovenia to win their first European championship title. Slovenia finished in second place in both the men's and women's tournaments.

== Qualification ==
The qualification events took place in the summer of 2014. A total of 15 teams of each gender (excluding the hosts Romania) qualified for the final tournament.

=== Men ===
==== Qualifier 1 ====
Was held in Zánka, Hungary, 12–13 July 2014. Top five will qualify.

Pool A

Team	Pld	W	L	PF	PA	PD	Pts
Spain	4	3	1	75	42	+33	7
Belgium	4	3	1	72	63	+9	7
Ukraine	4	2	2	53	61	−8	6
Poland	4	2	2	63	59	+4	6
Hungary	4	0	4	34	72	−38	4

Pool B

Team	Pld	W	L	PF	PA	PD	Pts
Lithuania	5	5	0	100	53	+47	10
Israel	5	3	2	79	76	+3	8
Switzerland	5	3	2	80	84	−4	8
Armenia	5	2	3	67	73	−6	7
Slovakia	5	1	4	60	84	−24	6
Germany	5	1	4	74	90	−16	6

Knock-out stage

Quarterfinals
Spain	21
Armenia	11
Israel	20
Ukraine	17
Lithuania	19
Poland	13
Belgium	15
Switzerland	7

Semifinals
Spain	21
Israel	16
Lithuania	21
Belgium	13

Final
Spain	14
Lithuania	15
Third place
Israel	21
Belgium	18

- Switzerland qualified to the Final Tournament as fifth qualified.

==== Qualifier 2 ====
Was held in Amsterdam, Netherlands, 19–20 July 2014. Top four, excluding hosts Romania, will qualify.

Pool A

Team	Pld	W	L	PF	PA	PD	Pts
Azerbaijan	3	2	1	49	35	+14	5
Romania	3	2	1	54	42	+12	5
Andorra	3	1	2	41	61	−20	4
Netherlands	3	1	2	47	53	−6	4

Pool B

Team	Pld	W	L	PF	PA	PD	Pts
Russia	3	3	0	61	29	+32	6
Turkey	3	2	1	44	46	−2	5
Georgia	3	1	2	41	38	+3	4
Sweden	3	0	3	23	56	−33	3

Knock-out stage

Quarterfinals
Russia	12
Netherlands	9
Romania	21
Georgia	17
Azerbaijan	21
Sweden	8
Turkey	21
Andorra	18

Semifinals
Russia	11
Romania	15
Azerbaijan	20
Turkey	11

Final
Romania	8
Azerbaijan	21
Third place
Russia	21
Turkey	16

- Andorra qualified to the Final Tournament as fifth qualified.

==== Qualifier 3 ====
Was held in Riga, Latvia, 2–3 August 2014. Top six will qualify.

Pool A

Team	Pld	W	L	PF	PA	PD	Pts
Slovenia	5	4	1	80	55	+25	9
Czech Republic	5	4	1	84	60	+24	9
Italy	5	3	2	77	61	+16	8
Denmark	5	3	2	71	54	+17	8
Croatia	5	1	4	62	83	−21	6
Wales	5	0	5	38	99	−61	5

Pool B

Team	Pld	W	L	PF	PA	PD	Pts
Serbia	5	5	0	99	73	+26	10
Greece	5	4	1	95	71	+24	9
Estonia	5	3	2	73	58	+15	8
Latvia	5	2	3	68	73	−5	7
North Macedonia	5	1	4	51	85	−34	6
Ireland	5	0	5	58	84	−26	5

Knockout stage

Quarterfinals
Slovenia	16
Latvia	15
Greece	21
Italy	11
Serbia	16
Denmark	12
Czech Republic	19
Estonia	13

Semifinals
Slovenia	17
Greece	18
Serbia	21
Czech Republic	15

Final
Greece	15
Serbia	21
Third place
Slovenia	20
Czech Republic	21

- Italy and Estonia also qualified to the Final Tournament as fifth and sixth qualified teams.

=== Women ===
==== Qualifier 1 ====
Was held in Zánka, Hungary, 12–13 July 2014. Top five, excluding hosts Romania, will qualify.

Pool A

Team	Pld	W	L	PF	PA	PD	Pts
Lithuania	3	2	1	40	44	−4	5
France	3	2	1	44	43	+1	5
Russia	3	1	2	44	44	0	4
Switzerland	3	1	2	48	45	+3	4

Pool B

Team	Pld	W	L	PF	PA	PD	Pts
Slovenia	4	4	0	59	42	+17	8
Azerbaijan	4	3	1	59	52	+7	7
Ukraine	4	2	2	63	65	−2	6
Romania	4	1	3	41	45	−4	5
Hungary	4	0	4	45	63	−18	4

Knock-out stage

Quarterfinals
Slovenia	8
Switzerland	14
France	17
Ukraine	18
Lithuania	16
Romania	8
Azerbaijan	10
Russia	15

Semifinals
Switzerland	21
Ukraine	12
Lithuania	13
Russia	11

Final
Switzerland	14
Lithuania	20
Third place
Ukraine	14
Russia	18

- Slovenia qualified to the Final Tournament as fifth qualified.

==== Qualifier 2 ====
Was held in Amsterdam, Netherlands, 19–20 July 2014. Top four will qualify.

Pool A

Team	Pld	W	L	PF	PA	PD	Pts
Belgium	3	3	0	54	21	+33	6
Netherlands	3	2	1	44	33	+11	5
Andorra	3	1	2	18	38	−20	4
Sweden	3	0	3	16	42	−26	3

Pool B

Team	Pld	W	L	PF	PA	PD	Pts
Greece	3	2	1	38	33	+5	5
Spain	3	2	1	30	25	+5	5
Italy	3	1	2	26	40	−14	4
Poland	3	1	2	33	29	+4	4

Knock-out stage

Quarterfinals
Greece	12
Sweden	7
Netherlands	12
Italy	11
Belgium	15
Poland	9
Spain	14
Andorra	10

Semifinals
Greece	11
Netherlands	10
Belgium	14
Spain	7

Final
Belgium	19
Greece	8
Third place
Netherlands	11
Spain	12

==== Qualifier 3 ====
Was held in Riga, Latvia, 2–3 August 2014. Top six will qualify.

Pool A

Team	Pld	W	L	PF	PA	PD	Pts
Ireland	3	2	1	39	29	+10	5
Estonia	3	2	1	35	24	+11	5
Slovakia	3	2	1	34	25	+9	5
Germany	3	0	3	24	54	−30	3

Pool B

Team	Pld	W	L	PF	PA	PD	Pts
Czech Republic	4	4	0	77	44	+33	8
Turkey	4	3	1	58	44	+14	7
Latvia	4	2	2	45	41	+4	6
Israel	4	1	3	43	38	+5	5
Wales	4	0	4	26	72	−46	4

Knockout stage

Quarterfinals
Ireland	8
Israel	9
Turkey	15
Slovakia	13
Czech Republic	18
Germany	1
Estonia	8
Latvia	12

Semifinals
Israel	10
Turkey	11
Czech Republic	11
Latvia	8

Final
Turkey	17
Czech Republic	13
Third place
Israel	8
Latvia	19

- Ireland and Slovakia also qualified to the Final Tournament as fifth and sixth qualified teams.

== Final tournament ==
Groups were announced on 27 August 2014.

=== Men's tournament ===
Pool A

Team	Pld	W	L	PF	PA	PD	Pts	SRB	ESP	ISR	CZE
Serbia	3	3	0	64	49	+15	6		22–17	21–16	21–16
Spain	3	2	1	58	59	−1	5	17–22		20–18	21–19
Israel	3	1	2	55	59	−4	4	16–21	18–20		21–18
Czech Republic	3	0	3	53	63	−10	3	16–21	19–21	18–21	

Source: FIBA

Pool B

Team	Pld	W	L	PF	PA	PD	Pts	BEL	EST	RUS	AND
Belgium	3	3	0	50	41	+9	6		13–10	16–15	21–16
Estonia	3	2	1	36	32	+4	5	10–13		15–14	11–5
Russia	3	1	2	44	39	+5	4	15–16	14–15		15–8
Andorra	3	0	3	29	47	−18	3	16–21	5–11	8–15	

Source: FIBA

Pool C

Team	Pld	W	L	PF	PA	PD	Pts	SLO	ROU	AZE	ITA
Slovenia	3	3	0	52	47	+5	6		21–20	16–15	15–12
Romania	3	2	1	51	42	+9	5	20–21		15–8	16–13
Azerbaijan	3	1	2	40	40	0	4	15–16	8–15		17–9
Italy	3	0	3	34	48	−14	3	12–15	13–16	9–17	

Source: FIBA

Pool D

Team	Pld	W	L	PF	PA	PD	Pts	LTU	GRE	TUR	SUI
Lithuania	3	3	0	51	39	+12	6		18–13	15–12	18–14
Greece	3	2	1	55	40	+15	5	13–18		21–8	21–14
Turkey	3	1	2	32	45	−13	4	12–15	8–21		12–9
Switzerland	3	0	3	37	51	−14	3	14–18	14–21	9–12	

Source: FIBA

==== Knockout stage ====
Quarterfinals
Serbia	16
Greece	20
Slovenia	14
Estonia	13
Belgium	15
Romania	21
Lithuania	15
Spain	13

Semifinals
Greece	13
Slovenia	16
Romania	18
Lithuania	13

Final
Slovenia	16
Romania	19
Third place
Greece	18
Lithuania	21

==== Final standings ====
Pos	Team	Pld	W	L	PF
1	Romania	6	5	1	109
2	Slovenia	6	5	1	98
3	Lithuania	6	5	1	100
4	Greece	6	3	3	106
5	Serbia	4	3	1	80
6	Belgium	4	3	1	65
7	Spain	4	2	2	71
8	Estonia	4	2	2	49
9	Israel	3	1	2	55
10	Russia	3	1	2	44
11	Azerbaijan	3	1	2	40
12	Turkey	3	1	2	32
13	Czech Republic	3	0	3	53
14	Switzerland	3	0	3	37
15	Italy	3	0	3	34
16	Andorra	3	0	3	29

=== Women's tournament ===
Pool A

Team	Pld	W	L	PF	PA	PD	Pts	LTU	TUR	CZE	GRE
Lithuania	3	3	0	39	32	+7	6		18–17	11–6	10–9
Turkey	3	2	1	42	40	+2	5	17–18		8–7	17–15
Czech Republic	3	1	2	30	35	−5	4	6–11	7–8		17–16
Greece	3	0	3	40	44	−4	3	9–10	15–17	16–17	

Source: FIBA

Pool B

Team	Pld	W	L	PF	PA	PD	Pts	RUS	SLO	ESP	LAT
Russia	3	3	0	54	38	+16	6		15–10	19–16	20–12
Slovenia	3	2	1	38	31	+7	5	10–15		11–10	17–6
Spain	3	1	2	40	37	+3	4	16–19	10–11		14–7
Latvia	3	0	3	25	51	−26	3	12–20	6–17	7–14	

Source: FIBA

Pool C

Team	Pld	W	L	PF	PA	PD	Pts	SUI	ROU	IRL	UKR
Switzerland	3	2	1	45	38	+7	5		20–15	17–11	8–12
Romania	3	2	1	52	49	+3	5	15–20		17–12	20–17
Ireland	3	1	2	39	48	−9	4	11–17	12–17		16–14
Ukraine	3	1	2	43	44	−1	4	12–8	17–20	14–16	

Source: FIBA

Pool D

Team	Pld	W	L	PF	PA	PD	Pts	BEL	NED	ISR	SVK
Belgium	3	3	0	46	31	+15	6		17–11	17–10	12–10
Netherlands	3	2	1	38	23	+15	5	11–17		12–1	15–5
Israel	3	1	2	27	42	−15	4	10–17	1–12		16–13
Slovakia	3	0	3	28	43	−15	3	10–12	5–15	13–16	

Source: FIBA

==== Knockout stage ====
Quarterfinals
Lithuania	13
Netherlands	14
Switzerland	10
Slovenia	11
Russia	21
Romania	15
Belgium	21
Turkey	17

Semifinals
Netherlands	8
Slovenia	13
Russia	15
Belgium	9

Final
Slovenia	13
Russia	16
Third place
Netherlands	10
Belgium	16

==== Final standings ====
Pos	Team	Pld	W	L	PF
1	Russia	6	6	0	106
2	Slovenia	6	4	2	75
3	Belgium	6	5	1	92
4	Netherlands	6	3	3	70
5	Lithuania	4	3	1	52
6	Romania	4	2	2	67
7	Turkey	4	2	2	59
8	Switzerland	4	2	2	55
9	Ukraine	3	1	2	43
10	Spain	3	1	2	40
11	Ireland	3	1	2	39
12	Czech Republic	3	1	2	30
13	Israel	3	1	2	27
14	Greece	3	0	3	40
15	Slovakia	3	0	3	28
16	Latvia	3	0	3	25

=== Medalists ===
Event	Gold	Silver	Bronze
Men	Romania; Adrian Vasile Stefan; Angel Santana; Bogdan Popescu; Catalin Vlaicu	Slovenia; Ales Kunc; Blaz Cresnar; Jasmin Hercegovac; Rok Smaka	Lithuania; Darius Tarvydas; Giedrius Marčiukaitis; Ovidijus Varanauskas; Vitalij Lukša
Women	Russia; Aleksandra Stolyar; Anastasia Logunova; Anna Leshkovtseva; Maria Cherepanova	Slovenia; Ana Ljubenović; Maša Piršič; Urša Žibert; Živa Zdolšek	Belgium; An-katrien Nauwelaers; Anne-sophie Strubbe; Hind Ben Abdelkader; Sara Leemans
