= Italy men's national 3x3 team =

National 3x3 basketball team

Italy
- FIBA zone: FIBA Europe

World Cup
- Appearances: 1

Europe Cup
- Appearances: 4
- Medals: Bronze: 2025

The Italy men's national 3x3 team is a national basketball team of Italy, administered by the Federazione Italiana Pallacanestro. It represents the country in international 3x3 (3 against 3) basketball competitions.

Italy also features a national under-18 3x3 team.

== Tournament record ==
=== World Cup ===
Year	Position	Pld	W	L
(Greece) 2012 Athens	did not qualify			
(Russia) 2014 Moscow	did not qualify			
(China) 2016 Guangzhou	16th	4	1	3
(France) 2017 Nantes	did not qualify			
(Philippines) 2018 Bocaue	did not qualify			
(Netherlands) 2019 Amsterdam	did not qualify			
(Belgium) 2022 Antwerp	did not qualify			
(Austria) 2023 Vienna	did not qualify			
(Mongolia) 2025 Ulaanbaatar	did not qualify			
(Poland) 2026 Warsaw	did not qualify			
2027 Singapore	to be determined			
Total	1/11	4	1	3

=== Europe Cup ===
Year	Position	Pld	W	L
(Romania) 2014 Bucharest	15th	3	0	3
(Romania) 2016 Bucharest	5th	3	1	2
(Netherlands) 2017 Amsterdam	Did not qualify			
(Romania) 2018 Bucharest	Did not qualify			
(Hungary) 2019 Debrecen	Did not qualify			
(France) 2021 Paris	Did not qualify			
(Austria) 2022 Graz	Did not qualify			
(Israel) 2023 Jerusalem	Did not qualify			
(Austria) 2024 Vienna	Did not qualify			
(Denmark) 2025 Copenhagen	3rd	5	3	2
(Belgium) 2026 Antwerp	10th	2	0	2
Total	3/11	13	4	9

== See also ==
- Italy national basketball team
- Italy women's national 3x3 team
