= 2017 FIBA 3x3 U18 Europe Cup =

International youth basketball competition

Tournament information
- Location: Debrecen
- Dates: 1–3 September
- Host(s): Hungary
- Venue(s): 1
- Teams: 24

The 2017 FIBA 3x3 Under-18 Europe Cup was the third edition of the Under-18 3x3 Europe Championships that was organized by FIBA Europe and was held between 1 and 3 September 2017, in Debrecen, Hungary. This 3x3 basketball event featured separate competitions for men's and women's national teams.

== Qualification ==
The qualification events took place in Szolnok, Hungary and Riga, Latvia on 5-6 August 2017. A total of 12 teams of each gender will be qualified for the championship through one of two qualifying tournaments.

=== Men ===
Event	Date	Location	Berths	Qualified
Host nation			1	Hungary
Latvia Qualifier	5–6 August	(Latvia) Riga	6	
Hungary Qualifier	5–6 August	(Hungary) Szolnok	5	
TOTAL			12	

=== Women ===
Event	Date	Location	Berths	Qualified
Host nation			1	Hungary
Latvia Qualifier	5–6 August	(Latvia) Riga	5	
Hungary Qualifier	5–6 August	(Hungary) Szolnok	6	
TOTAL			12	

== See also ==
- 2017 FIBA 3x3 Europe Cup
