= Toni Blazan =

Austrian basketball player (born 1992)

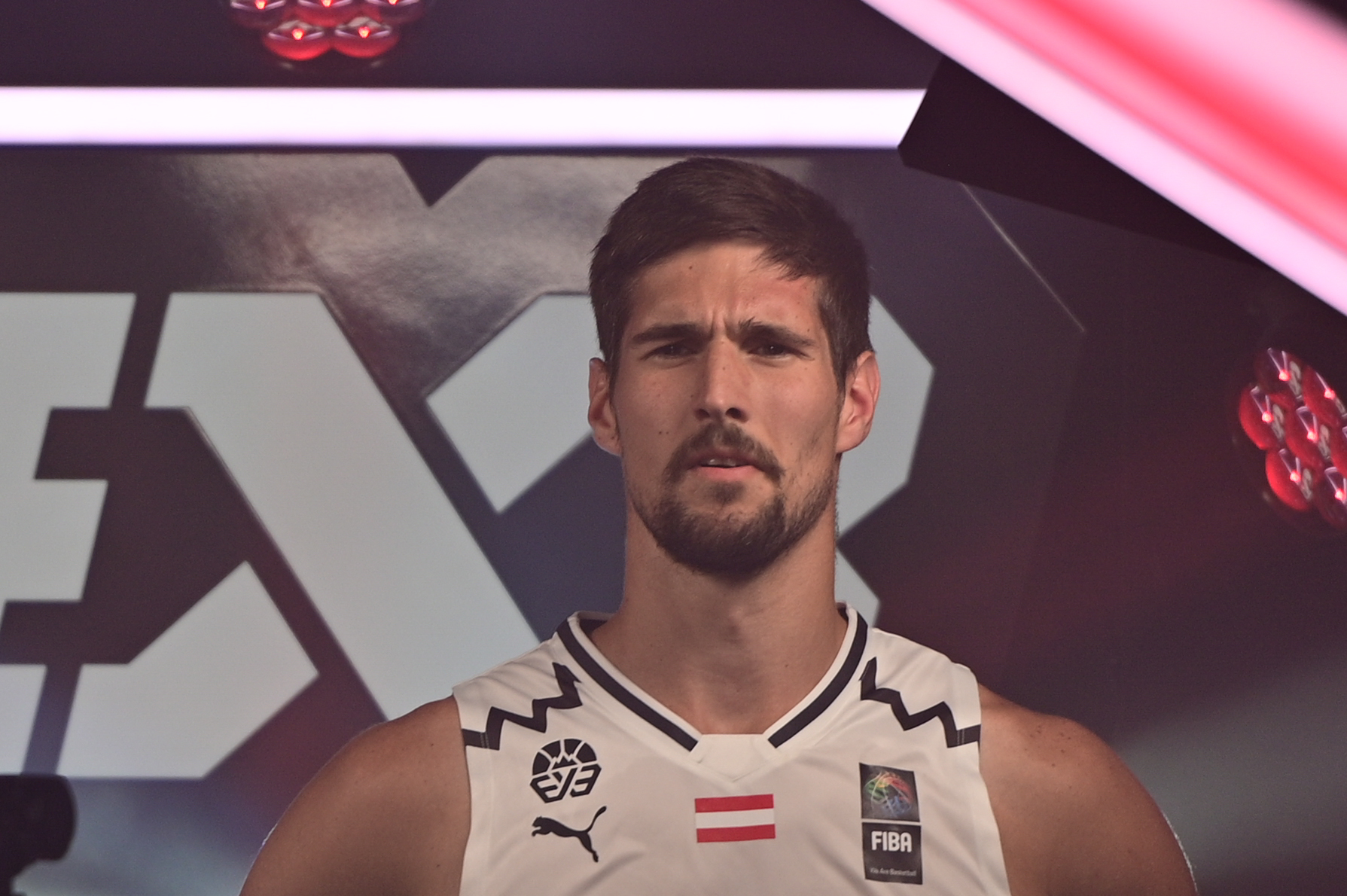
- Blazan in July 2024

Personal information
- Born: 15 May 1992 (age 34)
- Listed height: 6 ft 6 in (1.98 m)

Career information
- Playing career: 2010–present
- Position: Small forward

Career history
- 2010–2014: SKN St. Pölten
- 2014–2016: BSC Fürstenfeld Panthers
- 2016–2024: Swans Gmunden

Career highlights
- 2x Austrian Basketball Superliga champion (2021, 2023); Austrian Cup winner (2023); Austrian Supercup winner (2023); FIBA 3x3 Europe Cup winner (2024)
Medals
Men's 3x3 basketball
Representing Austria
FIBA 3x3 Europe Cup
Gold medal – first place	2024 Vienna

Toni Blazan (born 15 May 1992) is an Austrian basketball player who plays as a small forward.

== Professional career ==
Blazan made his first appearances in the Bundesliga during the 2010/11 season, playing for SKN St. Pölten. In 2014, he moved to league rivals Fürstenfeld Panthers, where he quickly became a regular starter, averaging 11.5 points and an average playing time of around 30 minutes per game.

In 2016, Blazan moved to Swans Gmunden. With the Upper Austrians he won the national championship in 2021. During the 2020/21 championship season, Blazan scored an average of 16 points per game and was the team's third-best scorer. In the 2022/23 season, he won the triple with Gmunden - the Bundesliga, the Cup, and the Supercup winners. After the 2023/24 season, he left Gmunden to devote himself entirely to 3x3 basketball.

== National team career ==
In the summer of 2016, Blazan was called up to the senior national team for the first time. With the Austrian team in 3x3 basketball, he finished sixth at the 2019 Europe Cup. At the 2024 edition of the 3x3 Europe Cup, which took place in Vienna, he won the European Championship title together with Nico Kaltenbrunner, Enis Murati, and Fabio Söhnel.
