= 2019 FIBA 3x3 U18 Europe Cup – Men's tournament =

2019 FIBA 3x3 U18 Europe Cup

Tournament details
- Host country: Georgia
- City: Tbilisi
- Dates: 6–8 September
- Teams: 12
- Venue(s): Rike Park

Final positions
- Champions: Lithuania (1st title)
- Runners-up: France
- Third place: Israel
- Fourth place: Ukraine

Tournament statistics
- MVP: (Lithuania) Gabrielius Celka

The 2019 FIBA 3x3 U18 Europe Cup – Men's tournament is the fifth edition of this continental championship. The event was held in Tbilisi, Georgia. It was contested by 12 teams.

Lithuania won their first title with a win against France in the final.

== Host selection ==
Georgia's capital, Tbilisi, was given the hosting rights.

== Qualified teams ==
Six teams qualified automatically, while two teams from qualifiers that were held in France, Italy and Hungary completed the field of twelve.

Automatically qualified

- (Georgia (country)) Georgia (host nation)
- Hungary (defending champion)
- Ukraine
- Estonia
- Romania
- Russia

Voiron Qualifier

- France
- Israel

Rieti Qualifier

- Italy
- Serbia

Szolnok Qualifier

- Belgium
- Lithuania

== Seeding ==
The seeding and groups were as follows:

Pool A	Pool B	Pool C	Pool D
Russia (1); Hungary (8); Lithuania (9)	Ukraine (2); Israel (7); Belgium (10)	France (3); Estonia (6) (Georgia (country)) Georgia (11)	Romania (4); Italy (5); Serbia (12)

== Preliminary round ==
=== Pool A ===
Pos	Team	Pld	W	L	PF	PA	PD	Qualification	(Lithuania)	(Russia)	(Hungary)
1	Lithuania	2	2	0	37	20	+17	quarter-finals			
2	Russia	2	1	1	33	29	+4	quarter-finals	12–16		21–13
3	Hungary	2	0	2	21	42	−21		8–21		

Source: FIBA
Rules for classification: 1) Wins; 2) Head-to-head record; 3) Points scored.

=== Pool B ===
Pos	Team	Pld	W	L	PF	PA	PD	Qualification	(Israel)	(Ukraine)	(Belgium)
1	Israel	2	2	0	41	28	+13	quarter-finals			20–13
2	Ukraine	2	1	1	36	31	+5	quarter-finals	15–21		21–10
3	Belgium	2	0	2	23	41	−18				

Source: FIBA
Rules for classification: 1) Wins; 2) Head-to-head record; 3) Points scored.

=== Pool C ===
Pos	Team	Pld	W	L	PF	PA	PD	Qualification	(France)	(Estonia)	(Georgia (country))
1	France	2	2	0	42	26	+16	quarter-finals		20–13	22–13
2	Estonia	2	1	1	34	30	+4	quarter-finals			21–10
3	(Georgia (country)) Georgia (H)	2	0	2	23	43	−20				

Source: FIBA
Rules for classification: 1) Wins; 2) Head-to-head record; 3) Points scored.
(H) Hosts

=== Pool D ===
Pos	Team	Pld	W	L	PF	PA	PD	Qualification	(Serbia)	(Italy)	(Romania)
1	Serbia	2	2	0	37	28	+9	quarter-finals			
2	Italy	2	1	1	36	31	+5	quarter-finals	15–21		
3	Romania	2	0	2	23	37	−14		13–16	10–21	

Source: FIBA
Rules for classification: 1) Wins; 2) Head-to-head record; 3) Points scored.

== Knockout stage ==
All times are local.

Quarter-finals
8 Sep 2019 – 12:45
Lithuania	15
Estonia	14
8 Sep 2019 – 13:10
Serbia	16
Ukraine	19
8 Sep 2019 – 14:45
Israel	18
Italy	16
8 Sep 2019 – 15:10
France	21
Russia	18

Semi-finals
8 Sep 2019 – 16:35
Lithuania	13
Ukraine	10
8 Sep 2019 – 17:00
Israel	11
France	21

Final
8 Sep 2019 – 19:00
Lithuania	21
France	14
Bronze medal
8 Sep 2019 – 18:00
Ukraine	18
Israel	21

== Final standings ==
Pos	Team	Pld	W	L	PF	PA	PD
1	Lithuania	5	5	0	86	58	+28
2	France	5	4	1	98	76	+22
3	Israel	5	4	1	91	83	+9
4	Ukraine	5	2	3	83	71	+12
5	Serbia	3	2	1	53	47	+6
6	Italy	3	1	2	52	49	+3
7	Russia	3	1	2	51	50	+1
8	Estonia	3	1	2	48	45	+3
9	Romania	2	0	2	23	37	–14
10	Belgium	2	0	2	23	41	–18
11	(Georgia (country)) Georgia	2	0	2	23	43	–20
12	Hungary	2	0	2	21	42	–21

== Awards ==
These players were given the awards after the competition:

=== Most valuable player ===
- (Lithuania) Gabrielius Celka

=== Top scorer ===
- (Ukraine) Illia Zaiets (43 points)

=== Team of the tournament ===
- (Lithuania) Gabrielius Celka
- (France) Sya Plaucoste
- (Israel) Omer Sadeh

== See also ==
- 2019 FIBA 3x3 World Cup – Men's tournament
- 2019 FIBA 3x3 World Cup – Women's tournament
- 2019 FIBA 3x3 Africa Cup
- 2019 FIBA 3x3 U18 Africa Cup
- 2019 FIBA 3x3 Asia Cup
- 2019 FIBA 3x3 Europe Cup
