= Norbert Thelissen =

Dutch basketball player

No. 21 – Utah State Aggies
- Position: Small forward
- League: Mountain West Conference

Personal information
- Born: 19 April 2000 (age 26) 's-Hertogenbosch, Netherlands
- Listed height: 2.01 m (6 ft 7 in)
- Listed weight: 99 kg (218 lb)

Career information
- College: Utah State (2021–present)
- Playing career: 2017–present

Career history
- 2017–2020: Heroes Den Bosch

Norbert Thelissen (born 19 April 2000) is a Dutch college basketball player for the Utah State Aggies of the Mountain West Conference (MWC). He previously played professionally for the Heroes Den Bosch in the Dutch Basketball League.

== Professional career ==
Thelissen made his debut for Den Bosch in the 2017–18 season, on 26 October 2017 against Aris Leeuwarden.

After the 2019–20 season, Thelissen decided to move back to Heroes Den Bosch U22.

== College career ==
Initially committed to Utah, he switched his commitment to Utah State and therefore will have three years of college eligibility remaining because he played professionally.

== Career statistics ==
Legend
GP	Games played	GS	Games started	MPG	Minutes per game
FG%	Field goal percentage	3P%	3-point field goal percentage	FT%	Free throw percentage
RPG	Rebounds per game	APG	Assists per game	SPG	Steals per game
BPG	Blocks per game	PPG	Points per game	**Bold**	Career high

=== College ===
Year	Team	GP	GS	MPG	FG%	3P%	FT%	RPG	APG	SPG	BPG	PPG
2021–22	Utah State	15	0	2.8	.400	.000	–	.5	.1	.1	.1	.5

== Personal life ==
Thelissen is majoring in health education and promotion.
