= Adrian Bogucki =

Polish basketball player (born 1999)

Free Agent
- Position: Center

Personal information
- Born: 18 November 1999 (age 26) Leszno, Poland
- Listed height: 215 cm (7 ft 1 in)

Career information
- NBA draft: 2022: undrafted
- Playing career: 2015–present

Career history
- 2015–2018: SMS PZKosz Władysławowo
- 2018–2019: Miasto Szkła Krosno
- 2019–2020: HydroTruck Radom
- 2020: Anwil Włocławek
- 2020–2021: Astoria Bydgoszcz
- 2021–2024: Arka Gdynia
- 2024–2025: Śląsk Wrocław
- 2025: Arka Gdynia
- 2025–2026: MKS Dąbrowa Górnicza

Career highlights
- PLK Best Young Player (2020); PLK Most Improved Player (2020)
Medals
Men's 3x3 basketball
Representing Poland
European Games
Bronze medal – third place	2023 Kraków–Małopolska

Adrian Bogucki (born 18 November 1999) is a Polish basketball player who last played for MKS Dąbrowa Górnicza of the Polish Basketball League (PLK). Standing at 2.15 m (7 ft 1 in), he plays as center.

== Professional career ==
Bogucki started playing professionally for SMS PZKosz Władysławowo in 2015–16 season. He stayed with the club for three seasons and signed with Miasto Szkła Krosno in 2018. He signed with HydroTruck Radom in 2019. He was named the PLK Best Young Player and PLK Most Improved Player while playing with HydroTruck Radom, in 2019–20 season.

In July 2020, Bogucki signed with Anwil Włocławek.

On December 12, 2020 he signed with Astoria Bydgoszcz of the Polish Basketball League.

On June 1, 2021 he signed with Arka Gdynia of the Polish Basketball League.

On June 12, 2024, he signed with Śląsk Wrocław of the Polish Basketball League.

On March 31, 2025, he signed with Arka Gdynia of the Polish Basketball League (PLK) for a second stint.

On July 19, 2025, he signed with MKS Dąbrowa Górnicza of the Polish Basketball League (PLK).
