= Thomas Kennedy (basketball) =

American basketball player

No. 1 – SeaHorses Mikawa
- Position: Power forward
- League: B.League

Personal information
- Born: May 17, 1987 (age 39) Detroit, Michigan
- Listed height: 6 ft 7 in (2.01 m)
- Listed weight: 209 lb (95 kg)

Career information
- High school: Southeastern (Detroit, Michigan)
- College: Mott CC (2006–2008); Detroit Mercy (2008–2010)
- NBA draft: 2010: undrafted
- Playing career: 2010–present

Career history
- 2010–2011: Wörthersee Piraten
- 2011–2012: Iwate Big Bulls
- 2012–2013: Yokohama B-Corsairs
- 2013: Shimane Susanoo Magic
- 2013–2014: Chiba Jets
- 2014–2015: Niigata Albirex BB
- 2015–2019: Gunma Crane Thunders
- 2019–2022: Hiroshima Dragonflies
- 2022–2024: Ibaraki Robots
- 2024–2025: Toyama Grouses
- 2025–present: SeaHorses Mikawa

Career highlights
- bj League champion (2013); B2 League MVP (2019); B2 League Scoring Leader (2019)

Thomas Kennedy (born May 17, 1987) is an American born Japanese professional basketball player for the SeaHorses Mikawa in the Japanese B.League.

== Career statistics ==
Legend
GP	Games played	GS	Games started	MPG	Minutes per game
FG%	Field goal percentage	3P%	3-point field goal percentage	FT%	Free throw percentage
RPG	Rebounds per game	APG	Assists per game	SPG	Steals per game
BPG	Blocks per game	PPG	Points per game	**Bold**	Career high

†	Denotes seasons in which Kennedy won an championship

Year	Team	GP	GS	MPG	FG%	3P%	FT%	RPG	APG	SPG	BPG	PPG
2011–12	Iwate	51	44	33.3	.425	.337	.776	6.1	1.3	1.0	0.2	18.0
2012–13†	Yokohama	52	46	29.6	.460	.358	.805	7.0	1.1	1.2	0.3	18.8
2013–14	Shimane	10	10	36.3	.400	.244	.853	7.5	2.9	1.3	0.7	17.1
2013–14	Chiba	14	14	25.9	.442	.365	.636	5.4	1.5	1.0	0.4	14.2
2013–14	Niigata	22	15	30.7	.442	.382	.817	5.8	1.5	0.9	0.4	18.0
2014–15	Niigata	52	52	31.6	.458	.371	.787	6.3	2.3	1.2	0.4	18.1
2015–16	Gunma	52	52	32.6	.478	.311	.817	7.2	2.1	1.1	0.1	24.6
