= Estonia men's national 3x3 team =

Estonia men's national 3x3 basketball team

Estonia
- Joined FIBA: 1934; 1991
- FIBA zone: FIBA Europe
- National federation: Estonian Basketball Association
- Coach: Siim Raudla

World Cup
- Appearances: 5

Europe Cup
- Appearances: 3
Home	Away

The Estonia men's national 3x3 team is the 3x3 basketball team representing Estonia in international men's competitions, organized and run by the Estonian Basketball Association.

== Competitive record ==
=== Olympic Games ===
Olympic Games					Qualification		
Year	Position	Pld	W	L	Pld	W	L
(Japan) 2020	Did not qualify				Did not qualify		
(France) 2024

=== World Cup ===
World Cup					Qualification		
Year	Position	Pld	W	L	Pld	W	L
(Russia) 2012	17th	5	1	4	via FIBA ranking		
(Greece) 2014	10th	6	4	2	via FIBA ranking		
(China) 2016	Did not qualify				via FIBA ranking		
(France) 2017	14th	4	1	3	via FIBA ranking		
(Philippines) 2018	9th	4	3	1	via FIBA ranking		
(Netherlands) 2019	15th	4	1	3	via FIBA ranking		
(Belgium) 2022	Did not qualify						
(Austria) 2023	Did not qualify						
(Mongolia) 2025	Did not qualify						
(Poland) 2026	To be determined						
(Singapore) 2027	To be determined						
Total	5/11	23	10	13			

=== Europe Cup ===
Europe Cup					Qualification		
Year	Position	Pld	W	L	Pld	W	L
(Romania) 2014	8th	4	2	2	6	3	3
(Romania) 2016	Did not qualify				3	1	2
(Netherlands) 2017	Did not enter						
(Romania) 2018	Did not qualify				3	2	1
(Hungary) 2019	Did not qualify				3	0	3
(Belgium) 2020	Cancelled				via FIBA ranking		
(France) 2021	7th	3	1	2	4	3	1
(Austria) 2022	Did not qualify				3	2	1
(Israel) 2023	Did not qualify				2	0	2
(Austria) 2024	Did not qualify				4	2	2
(Denmark) 2025	Did not qualify				2	0	2
(Belgium) 2026	11th	2	0	2	4	4	0
Total	3/11	9	3	6	34	17	17

=== European Games ===
European Games					Qualification		
Year	Position	Pld	W	L	Pld	W	L
(Azerbaijan) 2015	Top 16	4	0	4	via 2014 ECH		
(Belarus) 2019	PR	3	1	2	via FIBA ranking		
Total	2/2	7	1	6			

== Team ==
Estonia men's national 3x3 team – 2026 roster
Players
Coaches

Pos.	No.	Name	Age – Date of birth	Height	Club	Ctr.
G	1	Jaan Puidet	34 – January 4, 1992	1.91 m (6 ft 3 in)	TalTech	(Estonia)
G	2	Jorgen Rikberg	24 – March 9, 2002	1.90 m (6 ft 3 in)	Viimsi	(Estonia)
F	5	Aleksander Hint	26 – May 27, 2000	1.99 m (6 ft 6 in)	Tartu Ülikool Maks & Moorits	(Estonia)
F		Mihkel Kirves	29 – December 6, 1996	2.00 m (6 ft 7 in)	Transcom Pärnu	(Estonia)

Head coach

- (Estonia) Siim Raudla

Legend

- Club – describes last
  club before the tournament
- Age – describes age
  on 16 June 2026
