= 2024 FIBA 3x3 Europe Cup – Men's tournament =

Tournament details
- Host country: Austria
- City: Vienna
- Dates: 22–25 August
- Venue: Kaiserwiese

Final positions
- Champions: Austria (1st title)
- Runners-up: Serbia
- Third place: Lithuania
- Fourth place: Switzerland

The 2024 FIBA 3x3 Europe Cup – Men's tournament was the ninth edition of this continental championship. The event was held in the Austrian capital, Vienna.

Serbia were the five-time defending champions.

== Host selection ==
Vienna, Austria, was given the hosting rights on 21 February 2024. This marks the second time that Austria is hosting the event after Graz hosted the competition in 2022.

== Venue ==
The venue is at the Kaiserwiese in Vienna.

== Qualification ==
The only debutant is Great Britain.

	Date	Vacancies	Qualified
Host nation	21 February 2024	1	Austria
Defending champions		1	Serbia
3x3 World Rankings		3	Lithuania; Netherlands; France
(Denmark) Copenhagen Qualifier	7–8 June	2	Spain; Croatia
(Kosovo) Pristina Qalifier	8–9 June	1	Azerbaijan
(Slovakia) Bratislava Qualifier	15–16 June	2	Germany; Switzerland
(Romania) Bucharest Qualifier	15–16 June	2	Latvia; Great Britain
Total		12	

== Seeding ==
The seeding is as follows:

Pool A	Pool B	Pool C	Pool D
Serbia (1); Germany (8); Spain (9)	Lithuania (2); Switzerland (7); Croatia (10)	Netherlands (3); Austria (6); Azerbaijan (11)	France (4); Latvia (5); Great Britain (12)

== Tournament ==
The schedule was confirmed on July 26 2024.

=== Preliminary round ===
Pool A

Pos	Team	Pld	W	L	PF	PA	PD	Pts	Qualification	(Spain)	(Serbia)	(Germany)
1	Spain	2	2	0	42	33	+9	4	Quarterfinals			
2	Serbia	2	1	1	36	31	+5	3	Quarterfinals	15–21		21–10
3	Germany	2	0	2	28	42	−14	2		18–21		

Source: FIBA
Rules for classification: 1) Wins; 2) Head-to-head record; 3) Points scored; 4) Higher seed.

23 August 2024
13:15

Boxscore

Germany	18–21	Spain
Pts: Agyeman 9		Pts: De Blas 12

Kaiserwiese, Vienna
Referees: Vladimir Vesković, Alex Talisainen

23 August 2024
16:50

Boxscore

Serbia	15–21	Spain
Pts: Barać 6		Pts: Martínez 9

Kaiserwiese, Vienna
Referees: Brigitta Csabai-Kaskötő, Najib Chajiddine

23 August 2024
22:20

Boxscore

Serbia	21–10	Germany
Pts: Kojić 10		Pts: Giessmann 5

Kaiserwiese, Vienna
Referees: Pedro Maia, Najib Chajiddine

Pool B

Pos	Team	Pld	W	L	PF	PA	PD	Pts	Qualification	(Switzerland)	(Lithuania)	(Croatia)
1	Switzerland	2	2	0	37	32	+5	4	Quarterfinals			16–13
2	Lithuania	2	1	1	36	35	+1	3	Quarterfinals	19–21		17–14
3	Croatia	2	0	2	27	33	−6	2				

Source: FIBA
Rules for classification: 1) Wins; 2) Head-to-head record; 3) Points scored; 4) Higher seed.

22 August 2024
12:50

Boxscore

Lithuania	19–21	Switzerland
Pts: Uzupis 10		Pts: three players 6

Kaiserwiese, Vienna
Referees: Najib Chajiddine, Borka Srdić

22 August 2024
16:15

Boxscore

Lithuania	17–14	Croatia
Pts: Januševičius 11		Pts: Jović 6

Kaiserwiese, Vienna
Referees: Vladimir Vesković, Najib Chajiddine

22 August 2024
22:20

Boxscore

Switzerland	16–13	Croatia
Pts: Kazadi, Jurkovitz 6		Pts: Krstanović 6

Kaiserwiese, Vienna
Referees: Brigitta Csabai-Kaskötő, Pedro Maia

Pool C

Pos	Team	Pld	W	L	PF	PA	PD	Pts	Qualification	(Netherlands)	(Austria)	(Azerbaijan)
1	Netherlands	2	2	0	43	28	+15	4	Quarterfinals		22–19	21–9
2	Austria (H)	2	1	1	39	40	−1	3	Quarterfinals			20–18
3	Azerbaijan	2	0	2	27	41	−14	2				

Updated to match(es) played on 23 August 2024. Source: FIBA
Rules for classification: 1) Wins; 2) Head-to-head record; 3) Points scored; 4) Higher seed.
(H) Hosts

23 August 2024
13:40

Boxscore

Netherlands	21–9	Azerbaijan
Pts: Driessen, de Jong 6		Pts: Davis, Akbarov 3

Kaiserwiese, Vienna
Referees: Borka Srdić, Alex Talisainen

23 August 2024
17:15

Boxscore

Austria	20–18	Azerbaijan
Pts: Murati 9		Pts: Hamzayev 10

Kaiserwiese, Vienna
Referees: Pedro Maia, Brigitta Csabai-Kaskötő

23 August 2024
21:20

Boxscore

Netherlands	22–19	Austria
Pts: de Jong 10		Pts: Kaltenbrunner 9

Kaiserwiese, Vienna
Referees: Najib Chajiddine, Brigitta Csabai-Kaskötő

Pool D

Pos	Team	Pld	W	L	PF	PA	PD	Pts	Qualification	(France)	(United Kingdom)	(Latvia)
1	France	2	2	0	43	29	+14	4	Quarterfinals		22–14	21–15
2	Great Britain	2	1	1	35	42	−7	3	Quarterfinals			
3	Latvia	2	0	2	35	42	−7	2			20–21	

Source: FIBA
Rules for classification: 1) Wins; 2) Head-to-head record; 3) Points scored; 4) Higher seed.

22 August 2024
12:25

Boxscore

France	22–14	Great Britain
Pts: Seguela 9		Pts: Hamilton, Lautier-Ogunleye 6

Kaiserwiese, Vienna
Referees: Borka Srdić, Vladimir Vesković

22 August 2024
15:50

Boxscore

Latvia	20–21	Great Britain
Pts: Gluditis 10		Pts: Walshe 12

Kaiserwiese, Vienna
Referees: Najib Chajiddine, Borka Srdić

22 August 2024
21:55

Boxscore

France	21–15	Latvia
Pts: Seguela, Wilson 8		Pts: Lācis 9

Kaiserwiese, Vienna
Referees: Alex Talisainen, Pedro Maia

=== Knockout stage ===
All times are local.

Quarter-finals
August 24 – 21:15
Spain	16
Austria	21
August 24 – 20:50
France	16
Lithuania	21
August 24 – 14:45
Switzerland	21
Great Britain	10
August 24 – 15:10
Netherlands	16
Serbia	21

Semi-finals
August 25 – 13:00
Austria	21
Lithuania	14
August 25 – 13:25
Switzerland	10
Serbia	21

Final
August 25 – 19:30
Austria	18
Serbia	17
Bronze medal
August 25 – 18:15
Lithuania	21
Switzerland	18

==== Quarterfinals ====
24 August 2024
14:45

Boxscore

Switzerland	21–10	Great Britain
Pts: Jurkovitz 9		Pts: Walshe, Lautier-Ogunleye 3

Kaiserwiese, Vienna
Referees: Najib Chajiddine, Vladimir Vesković

24 August 2024
15:10

Boxscore

Netherlands	16–21	Serbia
Pts: de Jong 7		Pts: Kojić 9

Kaiserwiese, Vienna
Referees: Alex Talisainen, Brigitta Csabai-Kaskötő

24 August 2024
20:50

Boxscore

France	16–21	Lithuania
Pts: Wilson 7		Pts: Januševičius 11

Kaiserwiese, Vienna
Referees: Alex Talisainen, Brigitta Csabai-Kaskötő

24 August 2024
21:15

Boxscore

Spain	16–21	Austria
Pts: Aurrecoechea 6		Pts: Kaltenbrunner 13

Kaiserwiese, Vienna
Referees: Najib Chajiddine, Pedro Maia

==== Semifinals ====
25 August 2024
13:00

Boxscore

Austria	21–14	Lithuania
Pts: Murati, Söhnel 8		Pts: Januševičius 6

Kaiserwiese, Vienna
Referees: Vladimir Vesković, Brigitta Csabai-Kaskötő

25 August 2024
13:25

Boxscore

Switzerland	10–21	Serbia
Pts: Kazadi 4		Pts: Stojačić 8

Kaiserwiese, Vienna
Referees: Alex Talisainen, Najib Chajiddine

==== Bronze medal game ====
25 August 2024
18:15

Boxscore

Lithuania	21–18	Switzerland
Pts: Januševičius 11		Pts: Kazadi 10

Kaiserwiese, Vienna
Referees: Najib Chajiddine, Vladimir Vesković

==== Final ====
25 August 2024
19:30

Boxscore

Austria	18–17	Serbia
Pts: Kaltenbrunner 8		Pts: Kojić 8

Kaiserwiese, Vienna
Referees: Alex Talisainen, Brigitta Csabai-Kaskötő

== See also ==
- 2024 FIBA 3x3 Europe Cup – Women's tournament
- Basketball at the 2024 Summer Olympics – Men's 3x3 tournament
- Basketball at the 2024 Summer Olympics – Women's 3x3 tournament
- 2024 FIBA 3x3 AmeriCup – Men's tournament
- 2024 FIBA 3x3 AmeriCup – Women's tournament
- 2024 FIBA 3x3 Asia Cup – Men's tournament
- 2024 FIBA 3x3 Asia Cup – Women's tournament
- 2024 FIBA 3x3 Africa Cup – Men's tournament
- 2024 FIBA 3x3 Africa Cup – Women's tournament
