= Enis Murati =

Kosovan-Austrian basketball player (born 1988)

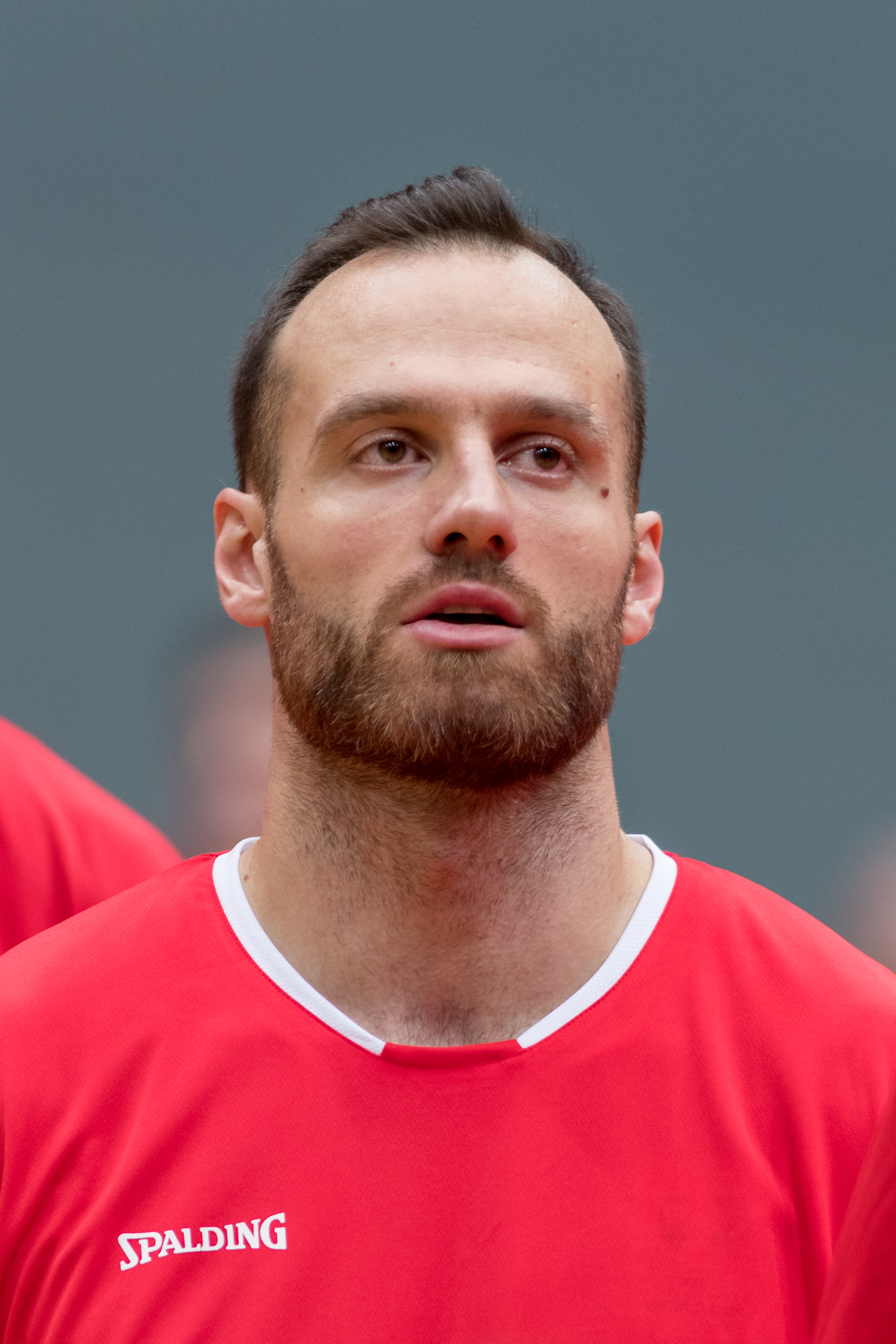
- Murati in 2017

Personal information
- Born: 2 August 1988 (age 38) Pristina, SAP Kosovo, SR Serbia, SFR Yugoslavia
- Listed height: 6 ft 5 in (1.96 m)

Career information
- Playing career: 2006–present
- Position: Small forward

Career history
- 2006–2015: Swans Gmunden
- 2015–2016: Leuven Bears
- 2016–2021: Swans Gmunden
- 2021–2023: BC Vienna

Career highlights
- 2x Austrian Basketball Bundesliga champion (2006, 2007); 2x Austrian Basketball Superliga champion (2021, 2022); 5x Austrian Cup winner (2008, 2010, 2011, 2012, 2022); 4x Austrian Supercup winner (2007, 2008, 2010, 2011); FIBA 3x3 Europe Cup winner (2024)
Medals
Men's 3x3 basketball
Representing Austria
FIBA 3x3 Europe Cup
Gold medal – first place	2024 Vienna

Enis Murati (born 2 August 1988) is a Kosovan-Austrian basketball player who plays as a small forward.

== Early life ==
Born in Pristina, SAP Kosovo, SFR Yugoslavia to ethnic Albanian parents, Murati moved to Subotica, Serbia with his family. He played for the youth team of Spartak Subotica.

== Professional career ==
Murati, who came to Austria in 2006, made his first brief appearances for Swans Gmunden in the Austrian Basketball Bundesliga during the 2006/07 season and helped them win the championship title. In the following years, he developed into the team's key player. In 2010 and 2011, Murati was named the Bundesliga player who had developed the best in a single season by the internet portal eurobasket.com. In 2010, he won the championship title again with Gmunden.

Murati spent the 2015/16 season with the Belgian first division team Leuven Bears. He returned to Gmunden for the 2016/17 season. In 2021, Murati was named Most Valuable Player of the Season after leading Gmunden to the championship title and averaging 18.9 points, 4.5 rebounds and 2.6 assists in 35 season games. In the summer of 2021, he joined BC GGMT Vienna, which was described by his new club as a "sensational transfer". He won the Austrian championship title and the cup competition with the team in the 2021/22 season.

In 2023, he switched to the 3x3 format.

== National team career ==
In 2014, Murati was in the Austrian national team squad for the first time after receiving Austrian citizenship the previous year. He played a total of 42 international matches. At the 2024 edition of the 3x3 Europe Cup, which took place on the Kaiserwiese in Vienna's Prater, he won the European Championship title together with Nico Kaltenbrunner, Toni Blazan and Fabio Söhnel.

== Personal life ==
Murati studied biology at the University of Salzburg.
