= Kosovo men's national 3x3 team =

National 3x3 basketball team

Kosovo
- FIBA ranking: 55 (8 June 2024)
- Joined FIBA: 2015
- FIBA zone: FIBA Europe
- National federation: Federata e Basketbollit të Kosovës (FBK)
- Coach: Agon Fehmiu
- Nickname(s): Dardanët (Dardanians)

FIBA 3x3 Europe Cup
- Appearances: None
Home	Away

First international
- Slovenia 21–8 Kosovo (Constanța, Romania; 30 June 2019)

Biggest win
- Andorra 6–21 Kosovo (Constanța, Romania; 30 June 2019)

Biggest defeat
- Slovenia 21–8 Kosovo (Constanța, Romania; 30 June 2019)

The Kosovo men's national 3x3 team (Albanian: Kombëtarja 3x3 e meshkujve të Kosovës, Serbian: Мушки 3к3 репрезентација Косова/Muški 3x3 reprezentacija Kosova) represents Kosovo in international men's 3x3 basketball. It is controlled by the Basketball Federation of Kosovo, the governing body for basketball in Kosovo.

== Competitive record ==
=== FIBA 3x3 Europe Cup ===
On 30 May 2019, The Basketball Federation of Kosovo confirmed that Kosovo will be part of 2019 FIBA 3x3 Europe Cup qualifications, together with Andorra and Slovenia. On 30 June 2019, Kosovo made his debut on 2019 FIBA 3x3 Europe Cup qualifications with a 21–8 away defeat against Slovenia and in the same day, Kosovo takes the first win in qualifications that was simultaneously also the first-ever competitive win was a 6–21 away win against Andorra.

FIBA 3x3 Europe Cup record							Qualifications record				
Year	Round	Pos	Pld	W	L	Squad	Year	Pos	Pld	W	L
(Romania) 2014	Not a FIBA Europe member						Not a FIBA Europe member				
(Romania) 2016 to (Romania) 2018	Team did not exist						—				
(Hungary) 2019	Did not qualify						(Romania) 2019	2nd	2	1	1
(France) 2021	Did not qualify						(United Kingdom) 2021	4th	0	0	3
Total	—	0/5	0	0	0	—	Total	2/6	5	1	4

== Team ==
=== Current roster ===
The following is the Kosovo roster were called up for the 2019 FIBA 3x3 Europe Cup qualifications.

Kosovo men's national 3x3 team roster
Players
Coaches

Pos.	No.	Name	Age – Date of birth	Height	Club	Ctr.
SG	1	Arti Hajdari	26 – 12 May 1993	1.90 m (6 ft 3 in)	Depertejshen	(Kosovo)
G/F	2	Arian Mehmeti	24 – 13 February 1995	2.02 m (6 ft 8 in)	Air Force One	(Kosovo)
G	3	Albatrit Berisha	28 – 19 June 1990	1.98 m (6 ft 6 in)	Air Force One	(Kosovo)
PG	8	Altin Sahiti (C)	29 – 27 December 1989	1.82 m (6 ft 0 in)	Air Force One	(Kosovo)

Head coach

- (Kosovo) Agon Fehmiu

- (C) Team captain
- Age – describes age,
  on 30 May 2019

== Notes and references ==
=== Notes ===
1. Agon Fehmiu in fact it is the coordinator of Kosovo 3x3, but during qualifications played the role of the head coach.
2. Arti Hajdari plays for Depertejshen in the 3x3 and for Peja in basketball.
3. Arian Mehmeti plays for Air Force One in the 3x3 and for Prishtina in basketball.
4. Albatrit Berisha plays for Air Force One in the 3x3 and for Rahoveci in basketball.
5. Altin Sahiti plays for Air Force One in the 3x3 and for NewBasket in basketball.
