= PLK Best Young Player =

The PLK Best Young Player award was an annual award in the Polish PLK that is given to the best player with the requirement for the player to be under 21 years old. A select group press members voted for the winner of the award. The last time the award was handed out was in the 2014–15 season.

== Winners ==
Season	Player	Club	Ref.
2010–11	(Poland) Michał Kwiatkowski	Polonia Warszawa	
2014–15	(Poland) Damian Jeszke	Rosa Radom	
