= Armenia men's national 3x3 team =

National 3x3 basketball team

Armenia
- FIBA zone: FIBA Europe

FIBA 3x3 World Championships
- Appearances: None

FIBA Europe 3x3 Championships
- Appearances: 1 (2014)
- Medals: None

The Armenia men's national 3x3 team is a national basketball team of Armenia, administered by the Basketball Federation of Armenia. It represents the country in international 3x3 (3 against 3) basketball competitions.

== See also ==
- Armenia national basketball team
