= Great Britain men's national 3x3 team =

National 3x3 basketball team

Great Britain
- FIBA zone: FIBA Europe

World Cup
- Appearances: 1

Europe Cup
- Appearances: 1

The Great Britain men's national 3x3 team is a national basketball team of Great Britain, administered by the Basketball Federation of Montenegro. It represents the country in international 3x3 basketball competitions.

== Results ==
=== World Cup ===
Year	Position	Pld	W	L
(Greece) 2012 Athens	Did not qualify			
(Russia) 2014 Moscow	Did not qualify			
(China) 2016 Guangzhou	Did not qualify			
(France) 2017 Nantes	Did not qualify			
(Philippines) 2018 Bocaue	Did not qualify			
(Netherlands) 2019 Amsterdam	Did not qualify			
(Belgium) 2022 Antwerp	Did not qualify			
(Austria) 2023 Vienna	Did not qualify			
(Mongolia) 2025 Ulaanbaatar	14th	4	1	3
(Poland) 2026 Warsaw	Did not qualify			
2027 Singapore	To be determined			
Total	1/11	4	1	3

=== Europe Cup ===
- 2024 – 8th place

== See also ==
- Great Britain men's national basketball team
- Great Britain women's national 3x3 team
