= Romania men's national 3x3 team =

International 3x3 basketball team

Romania
- Joined FIBA: 1932
- FIBA zone: FIBA Europe
- National federation: FRB

FIBA 3x3 World Cup
- Appearances: 5
- Medals: None

FIBA 3x3 Europe Cup
- Appearances: 4
- Medals: Gold: 2014
Home	Away

The Romanian men's national 3x3 team represents Romania in international 3x3 basketball matches and is controlled by the Romanian Basketball Federation (Romanian: Federația Română de Baschet).

== Senior Competitions ==
=== Performance at World Championships ===
Year	Position	Pld	W	L
2012 Greece	Round of 16	6	3	3
2014 Russia	Quarter-Finals	7	4	3
2016 China	15th	4	1	3
2017 France	13th	4	1	3
2018 Philippines	15th	4	1	3
2019 Netherlands	Did not qualify			
2022 Belgium	Did not qualify			
2023 Austria	Did not qualify			
2025 Mongolia	Did not qualify			
2026 Poland	Did not qualify			
Total	5/10	25	10	15

=== Performance at European Championship ===
Year	Position	Pld	W	L
2014 Romania	1st	6	5	1
2016 Romania	7th	3	1	2
2017 Netherlands	Did not qualify			
2018 Romania	11th	2	0	2
2019 Hungary	Did not qualify			
2021 France	Did not qualify			
2022 Austria	Did not qualify			
2023 Israel	Did not qualify			
2024 Austria	Did not qualify			
2025 Denmark	Did not qualify			
2026 Belgium	Did not qualify			
Total	3/11	11	6	5

== Current squad ==
Squad members for 2014 FIBA Europe 3x3 Championships.

Number	Player	Height (m)	Year of birth	Home city	World Ranking
4	Ángel Santana	1.98	1977	Bucharest	11
5	Ștefan Adrian Vasile	1.93	1985	Râmnicu Vâlcea	18
15	Bogdan Popescu	2.00	1978	Bucharest	74
27	Cătălin Vlaicu	2.00	1986	Bucharest	10

== See also ==
- 3x3 basketball
- Romania women's national 3x3 team
