= Austria men's national 3x3 team =

National 3x3 basketball team

Austria
- FIBA ranking: 12
- FIBA zone: FIBA Europe
- National federation: ÖBV

World Cup
- Appearances: 4

Europe Cup
- Appearances: 6
- Medals: Gold: 2024

The Austria men's national 3x3 team is the 3x3 basketball team representing Austria in international men's competitions.

The team competed at the 2021 FIBA 3x3 Olympic Qualifying Tournament hoping to qualify for the 2020 Summer Olympics in Tokyo, Japan. The team qualified for the tournament as host nation as the tournament was held in Graz, Austria. In 2024 the team won the Europe Cup in Vienna.

== Competitions ==
=== World Cup ===
Year	Position	Pld	W	L
(Greece) 2012 Athens	Did not qualify			
(Russia) 2014 Moscow	Did not qualify			
(China) 2016 Guangzhou	Did not qualify			
(France) 2017 Nantes	Did not qualify			
(Philippines) 2018 Bocaue	Did not qualify			
(Netherlands) 2019 Amsterdam	Did not qualify			
(Belgium) 2022 Antwerp	12th	5	1	4
(Austria) 2023 Vienna	6th	6	3	3
(Mongolia) 2025 Ulaanbaatar	11th	5	2	3
(Poland) 2026 Warsaw	7th	6	4	2
2027 Singapore	To be determined			
Total	3/11	22	10	12

=== European Championships ===
Year	Position	Pld	W	L	Players
(Romania) 2014 Bucharest	did not enter				
(Romania) 2016 Bucharest	did not enter				
(Netherlands) 2017 Amsterdam	did not enter				
(Romania) 2018 Bucharest	did not enter				
(Hungary) 2019 Debrecen	6th	3	1	2	Blazan, Lanegger, Linortner, Poljak
(France) 2021 Paris	12th	2	0	2	Kaltenbrunner, Krämer, Lanegger, Linortner
(Austria) 2022 Graz	6th	3	1	2	Kaltenbrunner, Krämer, Linortner, Trmal
(Israel) 2023 Jerusalem	5th	3	1	2	Kaltenbrunner, Krämer, Linortner, Murati
(Austria) 2024 Vienna	1st (gold)	5	4	1	Blazan, Kaltenbrunner, Murati, Söhnel
(Denmark) 2025 Copenhagen	8th	3	2	1	Diggs, Kaltenbrunner, Murati, Söhnel
(Belgium) 2026 Antwerp	future competition				
Total	6/11	19	9	10	

=== Champions Cup ===
Year	Position	Pld	W	L
(Thailand) 2025 Bangkok	6th	3	1	2
(Thailand) 2026 Bangkok	did not qualify			
Total	1/2	3	1	2
