= Belgium men's national 3x3 team =

National 3x3 basketball team

Belgium
- FIBA ranking: 4
- FIBA zone: FIBA Europe
- National federation: Basketball Belgium

Olympic Games
- Appearances: 1

World Cup
- Appearances: 4

Europe Cup
- Appearances: 6

The Belgium men's national 3x3 team is a national basketball team of Belgium, administered by the Royal Belgian Basketball Federation. It represents the country in international 3x3 (3 against 3) basketball competitions.

== Tournament record ==
=== Summer Olympics ===
| Year | Position | Pld | W | L |
|---|---|---|---|---|
| (Japan) 2020 Tokyo | 4th | 10 | 4 | 5 |
| (France) 2024 Paris | Did not qualify | | | |
| Total | 1/2 | 10 | 4 | 5 |

=== World Cup ===
| Year | Position | Pld | W | L |
|---|---|---|---|---|
| (Greece) 2012 Athens | Did not qualify | | | |
| (Russia) 2014 Moscow | Did not qualify | | | |
| (China) 2016 Guangzhou | Did not qualify | | | |
| (France) 2017 Nantes | Did not qualify | | | |
| (Philippines) 2018 Bocaue | Did not qualify | | | |
| (Netherlands) 2019 Amsterdam | Did not qualify | | | |
| (Belgium) 2022 Antwerp | 4th | 7 | 5 | 2 |
| (Austria) 2023 Vienna | 11th | 5 | 2 | 3 |
| (Mongolia) 2025 Ulaanbaatar | 15th | 4 | 1 | 3 |
| (Poland) 2026 Warsaw | 12th | 5 | 1 | 4 |
| 2027 Singapore | TBD | | | |
| Total | 4/11 | 21 | 9 | 12 |

=== Europe Cup ===
| Year | Position | Pld | W | L |
|---|---|---|---|---|
| 2014 Romania | 6th | 4 | 3 | 1 |
| 2016 Romania | Did not qualify | | | |
| 2017 Netherlands | Did not qualify | | | |
| 2018 Romania | 9th | 2 | 1 | 1 |
| 2019 Hungary | Did not qualify | | | |
| 2021 France | 9th | 2 | 1 | 1 |
| 2022 Austria | 7th | 3 | 1 | 2 |
| 2023 Israel | 7th | 3 | 1 | 2 |
| 2024 Austria | Did not qualify | | | |
| 2025 Denmark | Did not qualify | | | |
| 2026 Belgium | 8th | 3 | 1 | 2 |
| Total | 6/11 | 17 | 8 | 9 |

=== European Games ===
| Year | Position | Pld | W | L |
|---|---|---|---|---|
| (Azerbaijan) 2015 Baku | 11th | 4 | 1 | 3 |
| (Belarus) 2019 Minsk | Did not qualify | | | |
| (Poland) 2023 Kraków | 2nd (silver) | 6 | 5 | 1 |
| Total | 2/3 | 10 | 6 | 4 |

== See also ==
- Belgium national basketball team
- Belgium women's national 3x3 team
