= 2023 FIBA 3x3 World Cup – Men's tournament =

2023 FIBA 3x3 World Cup
Tournament details
- Host country: Austria
- City: Vienna
- Dates: May 30 – June 4
- Teams: 20

Final positions
- Champions: Serbia (6th title)
- Runners-up: United States
- Third place: Latvia
- Fourth place: Brazil

Tournament statistics
- MVP: (Serbia) Strahinja Stojačić

The 2023 FIBA 3x3 World Cup was held in Vienna, Austria, and was contested by 20 teams.

Serbia won their second consecutive and sixth title overall with a win over the United States.

== Qualified teams ==
All five FIBA zones were represented. The top 20 teams, including the hosts, based on the FIBA National Federation ranking qualified for the tournament.

Competition	Dates	Host	Vacancies	Qualified
Host nation			1	Austria
2022 FIBA 3x3 Asia Cup	6–10 July 2022	Singapore	3	Australia; Japan; Mongolia
2022 FIBA 3x3 Europe Cup	9–11 September 2022	(Austria) Graz	9	Belgium; France; Germany; Latvia; Lithuania; Netherlands; Poland; Serbia; Switzerland
2022 FIBA 3x3 AmeriCup	4–6 November 2022	(United States) Miami	3	Brazil; Puerto Rico; United States
2022 FIBA 3x3 Africa Cup	3–4 December 2022	(Egypt) Cairo	1	Madagascar
FIBA 3x3 World Cup Qualifier	6–7 May 2023	(Israel) Eilat	3	Hungary; Israel; Slovenia

== Players ==
Seed	Team	Players			
9	Austria	Nico Kaltenbrunner	Filip Krämer	Matthias Linortner	Rashaan Mbemba
17	Australia	Daniel Johnson	Mitch McCarron	Andrew Steel	Lucas Walker
5	Belgium	Caspar Augustijnen	Bryan De Valck	Dennis Donkor	Thibaut Vervoort
18	Brazil	Léo Branquinho	Jonatas Mello	Ruan Miranda	Jefferson Socas
8	France	Vincent Fauché	Jules Rambaut	Franck Séguéla	Alex Vialaret
10	Germany	Denzel Agyeman	Linus Beikame	Niklas Geske	Bastian Landgraf
19	Hungary	Kelemen Balázs	Attila Demeter	Tomislav Ivosev	Uroš Rosić
14	Israel	Ben Altit	Gur Lavy	Guy Palatin	Joaquin Szuchman
13	Japan	Thomas Kennedy	Tomoya Ochiai	Ryo Sadohara	Ryuto Yasuoka
7	Latvia	Francis Lācis	Kārlis Lasmanis	Nauris Miezis	Agnis Čavars
3	Lithuania	Evaldas Džiaugys	Gintautas Matulis	Darius Tarvydas	Ignas Vaitkus
20	Madagascar	Fiary Rakotonirina	Elly Randriamampionona	Livio Ratianarivo	Alpha Solondrainy
6	Mongolia	Ariunboldyn Anand	Davaasambuugiin Delgernyam	Onolbaataryn Enkhbaatar	Tsogtyn Otgonjargal
4	Netherlands	Jan Driessen	Arvin Slagter	Worthy de Jong	Dimeo van der Horst
11	Poland	Adrian Bogucki	Szymon Rduch	Mateusz Szlachetka	Przemysław Zamojski
16	Puerto Rico	Leandro Allende	Luis Cuascut	Adrián Ocasio	Antonio Ralat
1	Serbia	Marko Branković	Dejan Majstorović	Strahinja Stojačić	Mihailo Vasić
15	Slovenia	Adrian Hirschmann	Blaž Janežič	Jure Ličen	Jakob Strel
12	Switzerland	Jonathan Dubas	Marco Lehmann	Gilles Martin	Westher Molteni
2	United States	Canyon Barry	Jimmer Fredette	Kareem Maddox	Dylan Travis

== Preliminary round ==
The pools were announced on 8 March 2023.

All times are local (UTC+2).

=== Pool A ===
Pos	Team	Pld	W	L	PF	PA	PR	Qualification
1	Serbia	4	4	0	84	56	1.500	Quarterfinals
2	Brazil	4	3	1	73	68	1.074	Round of 16
3	France	4	1 (Note: Head-to-head: One win, one loss, ranked by points scored.)	3	66	72	0.917	Round of 16
4	Madagascar	4	1	3	63	81	0.778	
5	Germany	4	1	3	59	68	0.868	

Source: FIBA
Rules for classification: 1) Wins; 2) Head-to-head record; 3) Points scored.
Notes:

30 May 2023
18:15

Boxscore

Germany	14–17	Brazil
Pts: Beikame 5		Pts: Branquinho, Socas 5

Rathausplatz, Vienna
Referees: Cecília Tóth (HUN), Marek Maliszewski (POL)

30 May 2023
18:40

Boxscore

Madagascar	9–21	Serbia
Pts: Randriamampionona 4		Pts: Stojačić 7

Rathausplatz, Vienna
Referees: Glenn Tuitt (USA), Marek Maliszewski (POL)

30 May 2023
20:25

Boxscore

Brazil	19–16	France
Pts: three players 5		Pts: Vialaret 7

Rathausplatz, Vienna
Referees: Marek Maliszewski (POL), Edmond Ho (HKG)

30 May 2023
20:50

Boxscore

Madagascar	16–20	Germany
Pts: Randriamampionona, Ratianarivo 5		Pts: Geske, Landgraf 6

Rathausplatz, Vienna
Referees: Glenn Tuitt (USA), Cecília Tóth (HUN)

30 May 2023
22:05

Boxscore

Serbia	21–16	France
Pts: Stojačić 7		Pts: Vialaret 10

Rathausplatz, Vienna
Referees: Edmond Ho (HKG), Cecília Tóth (HUN)

1 June 2023
18:15

Boxscore

Germany	14–21	Serbia
Pts: Beikame 5		Pts: Stojačić 9

Rathausplatz, Vienna
Referees: Markos Michaelides (SUI), Glenn Tuitt (USA)

1 June 2023
18:40

Boxscore

Brazil	20–17	Madagascar
Pts: Branquinho 12		Pts: Ratianarivo 9

Rathausplatz, Vienna
Referees: Marek Maliszewski (POL), Cecília Tóth (HUN)

1 June 2023
20:25

Boxscore

France	14–11	Germany
Pts: Fauché, Rambaut 5		Pts: Agyeman 5

Rathausplatz, Vienna
Referees: Markos Michaelides (SUI), Marek Maliszewski (POL)

1 June 2023
20:50

Boxscore

Serbia	21–17	Brazil
Pts: Stojačić 7		Pts: Branquinho 7

Rathausplatz, Vienna
Referees: Markos Michaelides (SUI), Cecília Tóth (HUN)

1 June 2023
22:05

Boxscore

France	20–21	Madagascar
Pts: Séguéla 8		Pts: Ratianarivo 12

Rathausplatz, Vienna
Referees: Glenn Tuitt (USA), Marek Maliszewski (POL)

=== Pool B ===
Pos	Team	Pld	W	L	PF	PA	PR	Qualification
1	United States	4	4	0	84	65	1.292	Quarterfinals
2	Latvia	4	3	1	81	59	1.373	Round of 16
3	Austria (H)	4	2	2	72	71	1.014	Round of 16
4	Australia	4	1	3	64	70	0.914	
5	Slovenia	4	0	4	50	86	0.581	

Source: FIBA
Rules for classification: 1) Wins; 2) Head-to-head record; 3) Points scored.
(H) Hosts

31 May 2023
17:10

Boxscore

United States	21–17	Latvia
Pts: Fredette 11		Pts: Miezis 6

Rathausplatz, Vienna
Referees: Markos Michaelides (SUI), Edmond Ho (HKG)

31 May 2023
17:35

Boxscore

Slovenia	15–21	Austria
Pts: Hirschmann 9		Pts: Linortner 9

Rathausplatz, Vienna
Referees: Cecília Tóth (HUN), Edmond Ho (HKG)

31 May 2023
19:20

Boxscore

United States	21–18	Australia
Pts: Fredette 8		Pts: Walker 8

Rathausplatz, Vienna
Referees: Su Yuyen (CHN), Edmond Ho (HKG)

31 May 2023
19:45

Boxscore

Latvia	22–11	Slovenia
Pts: Čavars 7		Pts: Hirschmann, Ličen 4

Rathausplatz, Vienna
Referees: Cecília Tóth (HUN), Markos Michaelides (SUI)

31 May 2023
21:40

Boxscore

Austria	17–15	Australia
Pts: Linortner 8		Pts: Johnson 9

Rathausplatz, Vienna
Referees: Cecília Tóth (HUN), Markos Michaelides (SUI)

2 June 2023
17:10

Boxscore

Australia	22–10	Slovenia
Pts: Johnson 9		Pts: Hirschmann, Strel 4

Rathausplatz, Vienna
Referees: Cecília Tóth (HUN), Markos Michaelides (SUI)

2 June 2023
17:35

Boxscore

Latvia	20–18	Austria
Pts: Miezis 12		Pts: Linortner 7

Rathausplatz, Vienna
Referees: Markos Michaelides (SUI), Donald Quinn (INA)

2 June 2023
19:20

Boxscore

Slovenia	14–21	United States
Pts: Ličen 8		Pts: Travis 8

Rathausplatz, Vienna
Referees: Markos Michaelides (SUI), Su Yuyen (CHN)

2 June 2023
19:45

Boxscore

Australia	9–22	Latvia
Pts: Johnson 7		Pts: Travis 10

Rathausplatz, Vienna
Referees: Cecília Tóth (HUN), Donald Quinn (INA)

2 June 2023
21:20

Boxscore

Austria	16–21	United States
Pts: Kaltenbrunner 8		Pts: Fredette 13

Rathausplatz, Vienna
Referees: Markos Michaelides (SUI), Cecília Tóth (HUN)

=== Pool C ===
Pos	Team	Pld	W	L	PF	PA	PR	Qualification
1	Poland	4	2	2	80	78	1.026	Quarterfinals
2	Lithuania	4	2	2	78	70	1.114	Round of 16
3	Belgium	4	2	2	75	79	0.949	Round of 16
4	Puerto Rico	4	2	2	74	76	0.974	
5	Israel	4	2	2	70	74	0.946	

Source: FIBA
Rules for classification: 1) Wins; 2) Head-to-head record; 3) Points scored.

30 May 2023
12:00

Boxscore

Belgium	21–18	Israel
Pts: Donkor 10		Pts: Lavy 10

Rathausplatz, Vienna
Referees: Donald Quinn (INA), Markos Michaelides (SUI)

30 May 2023
12:25

Boxscore

Poland	18–21	Puerto Rico
Pts: Bogucki 6		Pts: Ocasio 7

Rathausplatz, Vienna
Referees: Markos Michaelides (SUI), Jasmina Juras (SRB)

30 May 2023
14:00

Boxscore

Lithuania	22–18	Belgium
Pts: Džiaugys 7		Pts: Donkor 6

Rathausplatz, Vienna
Referees: Jasmina Juras (SRB), Markos Michaelides (SUI)

30 May 2023
14:25

Boxscore

Israel	21–19	Poland
Pts: Palatin 9		Pts: Bogucki 6

Rathausplatz, Vienna
Referees: Jasmina Juras (SRB), Su Yuyen (CHN)

30 May 2023
15:25

Boxscore

Lithuania	21–15	Puerto Rico
Pts: Džiaugys 7		Pts: Ralat 6

Rathausplatz, Vienna
Referees: Donald Quinn (INA), Markos Michaelides (SUI)

1 June 2023
12:00

Boxscore

Poland	22–21 (OT)	Lithuania
Pts: Bogucki 9		Pts: Tarvydas 9

Rathausplatz, Vienna
Referees: Edmond Ho (HKG), Su Yuyen (CHN)

1 June 2023
12:25

Boxscore

Puerto Rico	20–16	Israel
Pts: Ralat 14		Pts: four players 4

Rathausplatz, Vienna
Referees: Jasmina Juras (SRB), Donald Quinn (INA)

1 June 2023
14:00

Boxscore

Belgium	15–21	Poland
Pts: Donkor 7		Pts: Zamojski 8

Rathausplatz, Vienna
Referees: Edmond Ho (HKG), Donald Quinn (INA)

1 June 2023
14:25

Boxscore

Israel	15–14	Lithuania
Pts: Lavy, Palatin 5		Pts: Matulis 5

Rathausplatz, Vienna
Referees: Jasmina Juras (SRB), Edmond Ho (HKG)

1 June 2023
15:25

Boxscore

Puerto Rico	18–21	Belgium
Pts: Ralat 8		Pts: Vervoort 10

Rathausplatz, Vienna
Referees: Jasmina Juras (SRB), Edmond Ho (HKG)

=== Pool D ===
Pos	Team	Pld	W	L	PF	PA	PR	Qualification
1	Netherlands	4	4	0	85	52	1.635	Quarterfinals
2	Switzerland	4	3	1	74	71	1.042	Round of 16
3	Japan	4	2	2	69	56	1.232	Round of 16
4	Mongolia	4	1	3	58	84	0.690	
5	Hungary	4	0	4	62	85	0.729	

Source: FIBA
Rules for classification: 1) Wins; 2) Head-to-head record; 3) Points scored.

31 May 2023
12:00

Boxscore

Mongolia	21–19	Hungary
Pts: Anand 12		Pts: Demeter 9

Rathausplatz, Vienna
Referees: Jasmina Juras (SRB), Glenn Tuitt (USA)

31 May 2023
12:25

Boxscore

Switzerland	14–13	Japan
Pts: Lehmann 8		Pts: Kennedy 7

Rathausplatz, Vienna
Referees: Marek Maliszewski (POL), Donald Quinn (INA)

31 May 2023
14:00

Boxscore

Netherlands	22–12	Mongolia
Pts: De Jong 13		Pts: Delgernyam 5

Rathausplatz, Vienna
Referees: Jasmina Juras (SRB), Marek Maliszewski (POL)

31 May 2023
14:25

Boxscore

Hungary	20–21	Switzerland
Pts: Demeter 9		Pts: Dubas, Lehmann 6

Rathausplatz, Vienna
Referees: Jasmina Juras (SRB), Donald Quinn (INA)

31 May 2023
15:25

Boxscore

Netherlands	21–13	Japan
Pts: De Jong 12		Pts: Sadohara 8

Rathausplatz, Vienna
Referees: Glenn Tuitt (USA), Marek Maliszewski (POL)

2 June 2023
12:00

Boxscore

Switzerland	17–21	Netherlands
Pts: Dubas 7		Pts: De Jong 9

Rathausplatz, Vienna
Referees: Edmond Ho (HKG), Glenn Tuitt (USA)

2 June 2023
12:25

Boxscore

Japan	22–13	Hungary
Pts: Kennedy 10		Pts: Demeter 6

Rathausplatz, Vienna
Referees: Edmond Ho (HKG), Marek Maliszewski (POL)

2 June 2023
14:00

Boxscore

Mongolia	17–22	Switzerland
Pts: Delgernyam 7		Pts: Dubas 9

Rathausplatz, Vienna
Referees: Edmond Ho (HKG), Glenn Tuitt (USA)

2 June 2023
14:25

Boxscore

Hungary	10–21	Netherlands
Pts: Demeter 5		Pts: De Jong 11

Rathausplatz, Vienna
Referees: Edmond Ho (HKG), Jasmina Juras (SRB)

2 June 2023
15:25

Boxscore

Japan	21–8	Mongolia
Pts: Kennedy 11		Pts: Otgonjargal 5

Rathausplatz, Vienna
Referees: Edmond Ho (HKG), Jasmina Juras (SRB)

== Knockout stage ==
=== Bracket ===
Round of 16
Lithuania	18
Austria	22
Latvia	19
Belgium	15
Brazil	20
Japan	17
Switzerland	18
France	19

Quarter-finals
Serbia	21
Austria	18
Latvia	19
Netherlands	18
Poland	11
Brazil	12
France	19
United States	21

Semi-finals
Serbia	21
Latvia	18
Brazil	17
United States	21

Final
Serbia	21
United States	19
Third place
Latvia	22
Brazil	12

=== Round of 16 ===
3 June 2023
14:00

Boxscore

Brazil	20–17	Japan
Pts: Mello, Miranda 7		Pts: Kennedy 8

Rathausplatz, Vienna
Referees: Glenn Tuitt (USA), Jasmina Juras (SRB)

3 June 2023
14:25

Boxscore

Latvia	19–15	Belgium
Pts: Lasmanis 13		Pts: Vervoort 9

Rathausplatz, Vienna
Referees: Marek Maliszewski (POL), Edmond Ho (HKG)

3 June 2023
16:10

Boxscore

Lithuania	18–22	Austria
Pts: Džiaugys 7		Pts: Linortner 9

Rathausplatz, Vienna
Referees: Edmond Ho (HKG), Markos Michaelides (SUI)

3 June 2023
16:35

Boxscore

Switzerland	18–19	France
Pts: Molteni 8		Pts: Séguéla 11

Rathausplatz, Vienna
Referees: Cecília Tóth (HUN), Donald Quinn (INA)

=== Quarterfinals ===
3 June 2023
19:20

Boxscore

Poland	11–12	Brazil
Pts: Bogucki, Szlachetka 4		Pts: Branquinho, Mello 5

Rathausplatz, Vienna
Referees: Markos Michaelides (SUI), Su Yuyen (CHN)

3 June 2023
19:45

Boxscore

France	19–21	United States
Pts: Séguéla, Vialaret 9		Pts: Fredette 7

Rathausplatz, Vienna
Referees: Jasmina Juras (SRB), Donald Quinn (INA)

3 June 2023
21:40

Boxscore

Serbia	21–18	Austria
Pts: Stojačić 7		Pts: Krämer 10

Rathausplatz, Vienna
Referees: Edmond Ho (HKG), Marek Maliszewski (POL)

3 June 2023
22:05

Boxscore

Latvia	19–18	Netherlands
Pts: Lasmanis 9		Pts: De Jong 8

Rathausplatz, Vienna
Referees: Cecília Tóth (HUN), Glenn Tuitt (USA)

=== Semifinals ===
4 June 2023
15:40

Boxscore

Serbia	21–18	Latvia
Pts: Stojačić 12		Pts: Miezis 8

Rathausplatz, Vienna
Referees: Markos Michaelides (SUI), Cecília Tóth (HUN)

4 June 2023
16:05

Boxscore

Brazil	17–21	United States
Pts: Branquinho 8		Pts: Fredette, Travis 6

Rathausplatz, Vienna
Referees: Jasmina Juras (SRB), Edmond Ho (HKG)

=== Third place game ===
4 June 2023
17:15

Boxscore

Latvia	22–12	Brazil
Pts: Lasmanis 7		Pts: Branquinho 6

Rathausplatz, Vienna
Referees: Jasmina Juras (SRB), Marek Maliszewski (POL)

=== Final ===
4 June 2023
18:25

Boxscore

Serbia	21–19	United States
Pts: Majstorović 7		Pts: Fredette 10

Rathausplatz, Vienna
Referees: Cecília Tóth (HUN), Edmond Ho (HKG)

== Final ranking ==
Rank	Team	Record
1st place, gold medalist(s)	Serbia	7–0
2nd place, silver medalist(s)	United States	6–1
3rd place, bronze medalist(s)	Latvia	6–2
4	Brazil	5–3
5	Netherlands	4–1
6	Austria	3–3
7	Poland	2–3
8	France	2–4
9	Switzerland	3–2
10	Lithuania	2–3
11	Belgium	2–3
12	Japan	2–3
13	Puerto Rico	2–2
14	Israel	2–2
15	Australia	1–3
16	Madagascar	1–3
17	Germany	1–3
18	Mongolia	1–3
19	Hungary	0–4
20	Slovenia	0–4

== Statistics and awards ==
=== Statistical leaders ===
Name	Points
(United States) Jimmer Fredette	59
(Serbia) Strahinja Stojačić	55
(Netherlands) Worthy de Jong	53
(Latvia) Nauris Miezis	49
(Brazil) Léo Branquinho	48
(Latvia) Kārlis Lasmanis	48

=== Awards ===
The awards were announced on 4 June 2023.

All-Star team
(Serbia) Strahinja Stojačić
(United States) Jimmer Fredette
(Latvia) Nauris Miezis
MVP
(Serbia) Strahinja Stojačić
