= Spain men's national 3x3 team =

National 3x3 basketball team

Spain
- Joined FIBA: 1934
- FIBA zone: FIBA Europe
- National federation: FEB
- Coach: Jaume Comas
- Nickname(s): La ÑBA, la Roja

World Cup
- Appearances: 4
- Medals: Gold: 2025

Europe Cup
- Appearances: 7

European Games
- Appearances: 1
- Medals: Silver: 2015

Mediterranean Games
- Appearances: 2
- Medals: Bronze: 2022
Home	Away

The Spain men's national 3x3 team is the 3x3 basketball team representing Spain in international competitions, organized and run by the Spanish Basketball Federation. (Spanish: Federación Española de Baloncesto)

== Senior Competitions ==
=== World Championships ===
Year	Pos	Pld	W	L	Players
(Greece) 2012	13th	6	3	3	L. Angulo, Comas, Garbajosa, Jiménez
(Russia) 2014	did not enter				
(China) 2016	4th	7	5	2	Meras, Rojas, Sánchez, Vasco
(France) 2017	did not enter				
(Philippines) 2018	did not enter				
(Netherlands) 2019	did not enter				
(Belgium) 2022	did not enter				
(Austria) 2023	did not enter				
(Mongolia) 2025	1st	8	6	2	Aurrecoechea, De Blas, Expósito, Martinez
(Poland) 2026	14th	4	1	3	Aurrecoechea, De Blas, Expósito, Martinez
(Singapore) 2027	to be determined				
Total	3/11	25	15	10	

=== European Games ===
Year	Pos	Pld	W	L	Players
(Azerbaijan) 2015	2nd	7	5	2	De la Fuente, Llorca, Martín, Vasco
(Belarus) 2019	did not enter				
(Poland) 2023	11th	3	1	2	Galarza, Martín, Martínez, Mendicote
Total	2/3	10	6	4	

=== European Championships ===
Year	Final tournament				Qualifier			Players
Year	Pos	Pld	W	L	Pld	W	L	Players
(Romania) 2014	7th	4	2	2	7	5	2	Martín, Rojas, Ros, Vasco (F), De la Fuente (Q)
(Romania) 2016	6th	3	1	2	7	6	1	De la Fuente, Rojas (F), Sesé (F), Vasco, Llorca (Q), Martín (Q)
(Netherlands) 2017	8th	3	1	2	4	3	1	De la Fuente, Díaz, Martín (F), Ortega (Q), Rojas
(Romania) 2018	6th	3	1	2	3	3	0	De la Fuente (Q), Guirao (F), Llorca (Q), Martín (Q), Pino, Rojas (F), Sánchez (F)
(Hungary) 2019	4th	5	3	2	5	4	1	De la Fuente, Martín, Pino, Reina (F), Vega (Q)
(France) 2021	Did not qualify				3	0	3	Martín, Martínez, Pino, Vega
(Austria) 2022	Did not qualify				4	3	1	Blázquez, Llorca, Martínez, Pino
(Israel) 2023	Did not qualify				2	0	2	Blázquez, Martín, Martínez, Mulero
(Austria) 2024	6th	3	2	1	4	4	0	Aurrecoechea, De Blas, Martínez, Mendicote
(Denmark) 2025	Did not qualify				5	4	1	Aurrecoechea, De Blas, Martínez, Mendicote
(Belgium) 2026	6th	3	2	1	4	4	0	Aurrecoechea, De Blas, Expósito, Zanca
Total	7/11	24	12	12	48	36	12	

=== Mediterranean Games ===
Year	Pos	Pld	W	L	Players
(Spain) 2018	9th	2	0	2	Brià, De la Rua, Omeragic, Oroz
(Algeria) 2022	3rd	5	4	1	Arcos, González, Mayo, Mendicote
Total	2/2	7	5	3	

=== Champions Cup ===
Year	Position	Pld	W	L
(Thailand) 2025 Bangkok	did not qualify			
(Thailand) 2026 Bangkok	2nd	5	2	3
Total	1/1	5	2	3

== Youth Competitions ==
=== Performance at Youth Olympics ===
Year	Pos	Pld	W	L	Players
(Singapore) 2010	8th	7	3	4	Costa, Medori, Motos, Pascual
(China) 2014	10th	10	7	3	Omeragic, Oroz, Sánchez, Triginer
(Argentina) 2018	did not qualify				

=== Performance at Under-18 World Championships ===
Year	Pos	Pld	W	L	Players
(Italy) 2011	13th	12	8	4	Chapela, Gómez, Medina, Méndez
(Spain) 2012	10th	8	5	3	Brizuela, Iriarte, Mendía, Zubizarreta
(Indonesia) 2013	7th	9	7	2	Gomila, Moix, Morales, Sarasola
(Hungary) 2015	4th	16	9	7	Brià, Jou, E. Pérez, de la Rúa
(Kazakhstan) 2016	9th	4	2	2	Font, García, A. Pérez, Vanaclocha
(China) 2017	did not enter				
(Mongolia) 2019	did not enter				
(Hungary) 2021	did not enter				
(Hungary) 2022	did not enter				
(Hungary) 2023	did not enter				
(Hungary) 2024	2nd	4	3	1	Coll, Enabulele, Huguet, Torres

== See also ==
- Spanish Basketball Federation
- Spain men's national basketball team
- Spain women's national 3x3 team
