= Germany men's national 3x3 team =

National 3x3 basketball team

Germany
- FIBA ranking: 9
- FIBA zone: FIBA Europe
- National federation: DBB
- Coach: Matthias Weber

World Cup
- Appearances: 5
- Medals: Silver: 2026

Europe Cup
- Appearances: 5
Home	Away
Medal record
World Cup
Silver medal – second place	2026 Poland	Team

The Germany men's national 3x3 basketball team for men is the basketball side that represents Germany in international 3x3 (3 against 3) competitions. It is organized and run by the German Basketball Federation.

== Tournament record ==
=== World Cup ===
Year	Position	Pld	W	L
(Greece) 2012 Athens	did not qualify			
(Russia) 2014 Moscow	23rd	5	0	5
(China) 2016 Guangzhou	did not qualify			
(France) 2017 Nantes	did not qualify			
(Philippines) 2018 Bocaue	did not qualify			
(Netherlands) 2019 Amsterdam	did not qualify			
(Belgium) 2022 Antwerp	11th	5	2	3
(Austria) 2023 Vienna	17th	4	1	3
(Mongolia) 2025 Ulaanbaatar	4th	8	5	3
(Poland) 2026 Warsaw	2nd	7	6	1
2027 Singapore	to be determined			
Total	5/11	29	14	15

=== Europe Cup ===
Year	Position	Pld	W	L
(Romania) 2014 Bucharest	did not qualify			
(Romania) 2016 Bucharest	did not qualify			
(Netherlands) 2017 Amsterdam	did not qualify			
(Romania) 2018 Bucharest	did not qualify			
(Hungary) 2019 Debrecen	11th	2	0	2
(France) 2021 Paris	did not qualify			
(Austria) 2022 Graz	did not qualify			
(Israel) 2023 Jerusalem	9th	2	0	2
(Austria) 2024 Vienna	10th	2	0	2
(Denmark) 2025 Copenhagen	4th	5	2	3
(Belgium) 2026 Antwerp	5th	3	2	1
Total	5/11	14	4	10

== Head coach position ==
- (Germany) Matthias Weber – (2021)

== See also ==
- Germany women's national 3x3 team
- Germany men's national basketball team
