= Croatia men's national 3x3 team =

National 3x3 basketball team

Croatia
- FIBA zone: FIBA Europe
- National federation: Croatian Basketball Federation

Mediterranean Games
- Appearances: 2018, 2026

The Croatia men's national 3x3 team is the 3x3 basketball team representing Croatia in international men's competitions.

In 2018, the team competed in the men's 3x3 basketball tournament at the 2018 Mediterranean Games held in Tarragona, Spain. The team was eliminated in the quarter-finals by eventual gold medalist France. At the men's 3x3 basketball tournament at the 2026 Mediterranean Games held in Taranto, Italy, team was again eliminated in the quarter-finals, reaching 6th place.

The team competed at the 2021 FIBA 3x3 Olympic Qualifying Tournament hoping to qualify for the 2020 Summer Olympics in Tokyo, Japan but failed finishing last in its group.
