= Israel men's national 3x3 team =

National basketball team in Israel

Israel
- FIBA zone: FIBA Europe

World Cup
- Appearances: 2

Europe Cup
- Appearances: 3

The Israel men's national 3x3 team is a national basketball team of Israel, administered by the Israel Basketball Association. It represents the country in international 3x3 (3 against 3) basketball competitions.

== World Cup record ==
Year	Position	Pld	W	L
(Greece) 2012	4th	9	5	4
(Russia) 2014	Did not qualify			
(China) 2016	Did not qualify			
(France) 2017	Did not qualify			
(Philippines) 2018	Did not qualify			
(Netherlands) 2019	Did not qualify			
(Belgium) 2022	Did not qualify			
(Austria) 2023	14th	4	2	2
(Mongolia) 2025	Did not qualify			
(Poland) 2026	Did not qualify			
(Singapore) 2027	To be determined			
Total	2/11	13	7	6

== See also ==
- Israel national basketball team
- Israel women's national 3x3 team
