= 2026 FIBA 3x3 Europe Cup =

Tournament details
- Host country: Belgium
- City: Antwerp
- Dates: 11–13 September
- Venue: Groenplaats

The 2026 FIBA 3x3 Europe Cup was the eleventh edition of the continental championship. The event was held at Groenplaats in Antwerp, Belgium. Lithuania were the men's and Netherlands the women's defending champions.

== Venue ==
The venue was located at Groenplaats, a public space situated in Antwerp's city centre, next to the Cathedral of Our Lady.

== Qualification ==
=== Men ===
12 teams participated.

| | Vacancies | Qualified |
|---|---|---|
| Host nation | 1 | Belgium |
| Defending champions | 1 | Lithuania |
| 3x3 World Rankings | 5 | France; Germany; Netherlands; Serbia; Latvia |
| Slovakia Qualifier | 2 | Italy; Switzerland |
| Romania Qualifier | 2 | Estonia; Spain |
| Kosovo Qualifier | 1 | Ireland |
| Total | 12 | |

=== Women ===
12 teams participated.

| | Vacancies | Qualified |
|---|---|---|
| Host nation | 1 | Belgium |
| Defending champions | 1 | Netherlands |
| 3x3 World Rankings | 5 | Czech Republic; France; Germany; Poland; Spain |
| Slovakia Qualifier | 2 | Hungary; Slovenia |
| Romania Qualifier | 2 | Sweden; Ukraine |
| Kosovo Qualifier | 1 | Azerbaijan |
| Total | 12 | |

== Medalists ==
| Event | Gold | Silver | Bronze |
|---|---|---|---|
| Men's team | Latvia; Francis Lacis; Kārlis Lasmanis; Nauris Miezis; Zigmars Raimo | Netherlands; Nesta Agasi; Jan Driessen; Worthy de Jong; Adriaan van Tilborg | France; Paul Djoko; Jules Rambaut; Hugo Suhard; Lucas Ugolin |
| Women's team | Netherlands; Janis Boonstra; Noortje Driessen; Ilse Kuijt; Evelien Lutje Schipholt | Spain; Txell Alarcón; Gracia Alonso De Armiño; Marta Canella; Helena Oma | Azerbaijan; Arica Carter; Brianna Fraser; Alexandra Mollenhauer; Dina Ulyanova |

== Men's tournament ==
Quarter-finals
13 September
Serbia (OT) | 21
Lithuania | 19
13 September
Germany | 14
Netherlands | 16
13 September
Spain | 14
France | 21
13 September
Latvia | 21
Belgium | 18

Semi-finals
13 September
Serbia | 14
Netherlands | 20
13 September
France | 15
Latvia | 17

Final
13 September
Netherlands | 10
Latvia | 19
Third place
13 September
Serbia | 14
France | 21

== Women's tournament ==
Quarter-finals
13 September
Netherlands | 21
Czech Republic | 3
13 September
Germany | 9
Slovenia | 17
13 September
Spain | 20
Belgium | 9
13 September
France | 15
Azerbaijan | 20

Semi-finals
13 September
Netherlands | 19
Slovenia | 15
13 September
Spain | 20
Azerbaijan | 16

Final
13 September
Netherlands | 16
Spain | 13
Third place
13 September
Slovenia | 18
Azerbaijan | 21
