= 2025 FIBA 3x3 Europe Cup =

Tournament details
- Host country: Denmark
- City: Copenhagen
- Dates: 5–7 September
- Venue: Ofelia Plads

The 2025 FIBA 3x3 Europe Cup was the tenth edition of the continental championship. The event was held on Ofelia Plads in Copenhagen.

Austria were the men's and Spain the women's defending champions.

== Host selection ==
Copenhagen, Denmark, was given the hosting rights on 6 February 2023. This was the first time that Denmark was hosting a major international basketball event.

== Venue ==
The venue was located at Ofelia Plads, a public space situated on the Kvæsthus Pier next to the Royal Danish Playhouse on the harbourfront in Copenhagen.

== Qualification ==
=== Men ===
12 teams participated.

| | Date | Vacancies | Qualified |
|---|---|---|---|
| Host nation | | 1 | Denmark |
| Defending champions | 22–25 August 2024 | 1 | Austria |
| 3x3 World Rankings | 1 January 2025 | 3 | Netherlands; France; Serbia |
| Slovakia Qualifier | 7–8 June 2025 | 3 | Germany; Lithuania; Italy |
| Romania Qualifier | 7–8 June 2025 | 3 | Switzerland; Latvia; Hungary |
| Kosovo Qualifier | 7–8 June 2025 | 1 | Ireland |
| Total | | 12 | |

=== Women ===
12 teams participated.

| | Date | Vacancies | Qualified |
|---|---|---|---|
| Host nation | | 1 | Denmark |
| Defending champions | 22–25 August 2024 | 1 | Spain |
| 3x3 World Rankings | 1 January 2025 | 3 | Netherlands; France; Germany |
| Slovakia Qualifier | 7–8 June 2025 | 3 | Great Britain; Lithuania; Austria |
| Romania Qualifier | 7–8 June 2025 | 3 | Hungary; Poland; Ukraine |
| Kosovo Qualifier | 7–8 June 2025 | 1 | Azerbaijan |
| Total | | 12 | |

== Medalists ==
| Event | Gold | Silver | Bronze |
|---|---|---|---|
| Men's team | Lithuania; Evaldas Džiaugys; Aurelijus Pukelis; Marijus Užupis; Ignas Vaitkus | Latvia; Rihards Kuksiks; Francis Lācis; Nauris Miezis; Zigmārs Raimo | Italy; Amedeo Della Valle; Carlo Fumagalli; Raphael Gaspardo; Dario Masciarelli |
| Women's team | Netherlands; Janis Boonstra; Noortje Driessen; Zoë Slagter; Lotte van Kruistum | Azerbaijan; Arica Carter; Brianna Fraser; Alexandra Mollenhauer; Dina Ulyanova | Spain; Gracia Alonso de Armiño; Juana Camilión; Vega Gimeno; Sandra Ygueravide |

== Men's tournament ==
Quarter-finals
7 September – 10:50
Serbia | 14
Latvia | 20
7 September – 11:15
Austria | 13
Germany | 21
7 September – 13:25
France | 17
Lithuania | 21
7 September – 13:50
Netherlands | 18
Italy | 21

Semi-finals
7 September – 16:00
Latvia | 21
Germany | 19
7 September – 16:25
Lithuania | 21
Italy | 15

Final
7 September – 19:25
Latvia | 17
Lithuania | 21
Third place
7 September – 18:25
Germany | 15
Italy | 22

== Women's tournament ==
Quarter-finals
7 September – 10:00
Netherlands | 21
Hungary | 10
7 September – 10:25
Germany | 11
France | 17
7 September – 12:25
Azerbaijan | 16
Poland | 13
7 September – 12:50
Spain | 20
Lithuania | 14

Semi-finals
7 September – 15:00
Netherlands | 21
France | 10
7 September – 15:25
Azerbaijan | 21
Spain | 17

Final
7 September – 19:00
Netherlands | 21
Azerbaijan | 16
Third place
7 September – 18:00
France | 15
Spain | 21
