= 2016 FIBA Europe Under-18 3x3 Championships =

International youth basketball competition

The 2016 FIBA Europe Under-18 3x3 Championships was the second edition of the European Under-18 3x3 basketball event that features separate competitions for men's and women's national teams. The tournament started on 16 July 2016 with the start of two qualifying tournaments and its final tournament was played in Debrecen, Hungary from 9–11 September 2016.

France won an historic double as both their men's and women's teams took home gold for their first championship in this competition.

== Qualification ==
The qualification events took place on 16–17 July 2016. A total of 26 men's teams and 22 women's teams took part in the two tournaments, with 12 teams of each gender qualifying for the final championship.

=== Men ===
==== Qualifier 1 ====
The first qualifying tournament took place in Riga, Latvia from 16 to 17 July 2016. The top six teams qualified for the U-18 European Championships.

Group A

| Pos | Team | Pld | W | L | PF | PA | PD | PCT | Qualification |
|---|---|---|---|---|---|---|---|---|---|
| 1 | Germany | 2 | 2 | 0 | 40 | 18 | +22 | 1.000 | Quarterfinals |
| 2 | Romania | 2 | 1 | 1 | 22 | 26 | −4 | .500 | Quarterfinals |
| 3 | Russia | 2 | 0 | 2 | 16 | 34 | −18 | .000 | |

Source: FIBA
Rules for classification: 1) Winning percentage; 2) Head-to-head; 3) Points scored.

Group B

| Pos | Team | Pld | W | L | PF | PA | PD | PCT | Qualification |
|---|---|---|---|---|---|---|---|---|---|
| 1 | Slovenia | 2 | 1 | 1 | 28 | 28 | 0 | .500 | Quarterfinals |
| 2 | Latvia | 2 | 1 | 1 | 26 | 24 | +2 | .500 | Quarterfinals |
| 3 | Spain | 2 | 1 | 1 | 25 | 27 | −2 | .500 | |

Source: FIBA
Rules for classification: 1) Winning percentage; 2) Head-to-head; 3) Points scored.

Group C

| Pos | Team | Pld | W | L | PF | PA | PD | PCT | Qualification |
|---|---|---|---|---|---|---|---|---|---|
| 1 | Belarus | 3 | 2 | 1 | 48 | 34 | +14 | .667 | Quarterfinals |
| 2 | Poland | 3 | 2 | 1 | 44 | 39 | +5 | .667 | Quarterfinals |
| 3 | North Macedonia | 3 | 1 | 2 | 38 | 56 | −18 | .333 | |
| 4 | Ukraine | 3 | 1 | 2 | 44 | 45 | −1 | .333 | |

Source: FIBA
Rules for classification: 1) Winning percentage; 2) Head-to-head; 3) Points scored.

Group D

| Pos | Team | Pld | W | L | PF | PA | PD | PCT | Qualification |
|---|---|---|---|---|---|---|---|---|---|
| 1 | Turkey | 3 | 3 | 0 | 50 | 39 | +11 | 1.000 | Quarterfinals |
| 2 | Serbia | 3 | 2 | 1 | 42 | 31 | +11 | .667 | Quarterfinals |
| 3 | Israel | 3 | 1 | 2 | 38 | 45 | −7 | .333 | |
| 4 | Bulgaria | 3 | 0 | 3 | 26 | 41 | −15 | .000 | |

Source: FIBA
Rules for classification: 1) Winning percentage; 2) Head-to-head; 3) Points scored.

Bracket

Quarterfinals
Germany | 13
Serbia | 18
Belarus | 10
Latvia | 14
Slovenia | 15
Poland | 13
Turkey | 13
Romania | 19

Semifinals
Serbia | 7
Latvia | 9
Slovenia | 13
Romania | 11

Final
Latvia | 14
Slovenia | 15

Loser Bracket
Germany | 21
Belarus | 10
Poland | 9
Turkey | 14

Qualify
Germany
Turkey

- The four quarterfinal winners (Slovenia, Latvia, Serbia, and Romania), plus the fifth and sixth-placed teams (Turkey and Germany), qualified for the U-18 European Championships.

==== Qualifier 2 ====
The second qualifying tournament took place in Szolnok, Hungary from 16 to 17 July 2016. The top six teams qualified for the U-18 European Championships.

Group A

| Pos | Team | Pld | W | L | PF | PA | PD | PCT | Qualification |
|---|---|---|---|---|---|---|---|---|---|
| 1 | Georgia | 2 | 2 | 0 | 38 | 21 | +17 | 1.000 | Quarterfinals |
| 2 | Netherlands | 2 | 1 | 1 | 22 | 33 | −11 | .500 | Quarterfinals |
| 3 | Slovakia | 2 | 0 | 2 | 28 | 34 | −6 | .000 | |

Source: FIBA
Rules for classification: 1) Winning percentage; 2) Head-to-head; 3) Points scored.

Group B

| Pos | Team | Pld | W | L | PF | PA | PD | PCT | Qualification |
|---|---|---|---|---|---|---|---|---|---|
| 1 | Hungary | 2 | 2 | 0 | 42 | 28 | +14 | 1.000 | Quarterfinals |
| 2 | France | 2 | 1 | 1 | 34 | 31 | +3 | .500 | Quarterfinals |
| 3 | Ireland | 2 | 0 | 2 | 24 | 41 | −17 | .000 | |

Source: FIBA
Rules for classification: 1) Winning percentage; 2) Head-to-head; 3) Points scored.

Group C

| Pos | Team | Pld | W | L | PF | PA | PD | PCT | Qualification |
|---|---|---|---|---|---|---|---|---|---|
| 1 | Czech Republic | 1 | 1 | 0 | 20 | 8 | +12 | 1.000 | Quarterfinals |
| 2 | Andorra | 1 | 0 | 1 | 8 | 20 | −12 | .000 | Quarterfinals |
| 3 | Wales (D) | 0 | 0 | 0 | 0 | 0 | 0 | — | |

Source: FIBA
Rules for classification: 1) Winning percentage; 2) Head-to-head; 3) Points scored.
(D) Disqualified

Group D

| Pos | Team | Pld | W | L | PF | PA | PD | PCT | Qualification |
|---|---|---|---|---|---|---|---|---|---|
| 1 | Belgium | 2 | 2 | 0 | 40 | 33 | +7 | 1.000 | Quarterfinals |
| 2 | Lithuania | 2 | 1 | 1 | 27 | 27 | 0 | .500 | Quarterfinals |
| 3 | Switzerland | 2 | 0 | 2 | 24 | 31 | −7 | .000 | |

Source: FIBA
Rules for classification: 1) Winning percentage; 2) Head-to-head; 3) Points scored.

Bracket

Quarterfinals
Georgia | 18
Lithuania | 12
Czech Republic | 21
France | 17
Hungary | 21
Andorra | 16
Belgium | 19
Netherlands | 17

Semifinals
Georgia | 17
Czech Republic | 21
Hungary | 10
Belgium | 13

Final
Czech Republic | 14
Belgium | 13

Loser Bracket
Lithuania | 14
France | 21
Andorra | 21
Netherlands | 19

Fifth place game
France | 21
Andorra | 16

- The four quarterfinal winners (Czech Republic, Belgium, Hungary, and Georgia), plus the fifth and sixth-placed teams (France and Andorra), qualified for the U-18 European Championships.

=== Women ===
==== Qualifier 1 ====
The first qualifying tournament took place in Riga, Latvia from 16 to 17 July 2016. The top five teams qualified for the U-18 European Championships.

Group A

| Pos | Team | Pld | W | L | PF | PA | PD | PCT | Qualification |
|---|---|---|---|---|---|---|---|---|---|
| 1 | Belgium | 4 | 4 | 0 | 58 | 44 | +14 | 1.000 | Quarterfinals |
| 2 | Russia | 4 | 3 | 1 | 63 | 49 | +14 | .750 | Quarterfinals |
| 3 | Switzerland | 4 | 1 | 3 | 57 | 60 | −3 | .250 | Quarterfinals |
| 4 | Netherlands | 4 | 1 | 3 | 52 | 59 | −7 | .250 | Quarterfinals |
| 5 | Germany | 4 | 1 | 3 | 44 | 62 | −18 | .250 | |

Source: FIBA
Rules for classification: 1) Winning percentage; 2) Head-to-head; 3) Points scored.

Group B

| Pos | Team | Pld | W | L | PF | PA | PD | PCT | Qualification |
|---|---|---|---|---|---|---|---|---|---|
| 1 | Spain | 4 | 4 | 0 | 78 | 9 | +69 | 1.000 | Quarterfinals |
| 2 | Latvia | 4 | 3 | 1 | 44 | 41 | +3 | .750 | Quarterfinals |
| 3 | Slovakia | 4 | 2 | 2 | 35 | 52 | −17 | .500 | Quarterfinals |
| 4 | Turkey | 4 | 1 | 3 | 42 | 50 | −8 | .250 | Quarterfinals |
| 5 | Andorra | 4 | 0 | 4 | 27 | 74 | −47 | .000 | |

Source: FIBA
Rules for classification: 1) Winning percentage; 2) Head-to-head; 3) Points scored.

Bracket

Quarterfinals
Belgium | 14
Turkey | 4
Latvia | 5
Switzerland | 16
Spain | 13
Netherlands | 8
Russia | 11
Slovakia | 7

Semifinals
Belgium | 16
Switzerland | 14
Spain | 21
Russia | 5

Final
Belgium | 6
Spain | 20

Loser Bracket
Turkey | 16
Latvia | 8
Netherlands | 14
Slovakia | 13

Fifth place game
Turkey | 10
Netherlands | 17

- The four quarterfinal winners (Spain, Belgium, Russia, and Switzerland), plus the fifth-placed team (Netherlands), qualified for the U-18 European Championships.

==== Qualifier 2 ====
The second qualifying tournament took place in Szolnok, Hungary from 16 to 17 July 2016. The top six teams, plus host Hungary, qualified for the U-18 European Championships.

Group A

| Pos | Team | Pld | W | L | PF | PA | PD | PCT | Qualification |
|---|---|---|---|---|---|---|---|---|---|
| 1 | Lithuania | 1 | 1 | 0 | 15 | 11 | +4 | 1.000 | Quarterfinals |
| 2 | Hungary | 1 | 0 | 1 | 11 | 15 | −4 | .000 | Quarterfinals |
| 3 | Wales (D) | 0 | 0 | 0 | 0 | 0 | 0 | — | |

Source: FIBA
Rules for classification: 1) Winning percentage; 2) Head-to-head; 3) Points scored.
(D) Disqualified

Group B

| Pos | Team | Pld | W | L | PF | PA | PD | PCT | Qualification |
|---|---|---|---|---|---|---|---|---|---|
| 1 | France | 2 | 2 | 0 | 38 | 27 | +11 | 1.000 | Quarterfinals |
| 2 | Belarus | 2 | 1 | 1 | 33 | 20 | +13 | .500 | Quarterfinals |
| 3 | Ireland | 2 | 0 | 2 | 14 | 38 | −24 | .000 | |

Source: FIBA
Rules for classification: 1) Winning percentage; 2) Head-to-head; 3) Points scored.

Group C

| Pos | Team | Pld | W | L | PF | PA | PD | PCT | Qualification |
|---|---|---|---|---|---|---|---|---|---|
| 1 | Czech Republic | 2 | 2 | 0 | 36 | 17 | +19 | 1.000 | Quarterfinals |
| 2 | Austria | 2 | 1 | 1 | 23 | 26 | −3 | .500 | Quarterfinals |
| 3 | Poland | 2 | 0 | 2 | 19 | 35 | −16 | .000 | |

Source: FIBA
Rules for classification: 1) Winning percentage; 2) Head-to-head; 3) Points scored.

Group D

| Pos | Team | Pld | W | L | PF | PA | PD | PCT | Qualification |
|---|---|---|---|---|---|---|---|---|---|
| 1 | Israel | 2 | 2 | 0 | 26 | 24 | +2 | 1.000 | Quarterfinals |
| 2 | Ukraine | 2 | 1 | 1 | 34 | 33 | +1 | .500 | Quarterfinals |
| 3 | Romania | 2 | 0 | 2 | 30 | 33 | −3 | .000 | |

Source: FIBA
Rules for classification: 1) Winning percentage; 2) Head-to-head; 3) Points scored.

Bracket

Quarterfinals
Lithuania | 13
Ukraine | 8
Czech Republic | 17
Belarus | 14
France | 13
Austria | 11
Israel | 17
Hungary | 12

Semifinals
Lithuania | 18
Czech Republic | 16
France | 12
Israel | 7

Final
Lithuania | 15
France | 19

Loser Bracket
Ukraine | 12
Belarus | 21
Austria | 13
Hungary | 11

Qualify
Belarus
Austria

- Hosts Hungary and the four quarterfinal winners (France, Lithuania, Czech Republic, and Israel), plus the fifth and sixth-placed teams (Belarus and Austria), qualified for the U-18 European Championships.

== Final Tournament ==
The second edition of the FIBA 3x3 Under-18 European Championships was held in Debrecen, Hungary from 9 to 11 September 2016. A total of 12 teams of each gender qualified for the championship through one of two qualifying tournaments. Pools were announced on 9 August 2016.

France won an historic double as both their men's and women's teams took home gold for their first championship in this competition.

=== Qualified Teams ===
Men's teams

- Hungary (hosts)
- Andorra
- Belgium
- Czech Republic
- France
- Georgia
- Germany
- Latvia
- Romania
- Serbia
- Slovenia
- Turkey

Women's teams

- Hungary (hosts)
- Austria
- Belarus
- Belgium
- Czech Republic
- France
- Israel
- Lithuania
- Netherlands
- Russia
- Spain
- Switzerland

=== Men's tournament ===
==== Pool play ====
Pool A

| Pos | Team | Pld | W | L | PF | PA | PD | PCT | Qualification | (Romania) | (France) | (Georgia (country)) |
|---|---|---|---|---|---|---|---|---|---|---|---|---|
| 1 | Romania | 2 | 2 | 0 | 33 | 28 | +5 | 1.000 | Advance to quarterfinals | — | 17–14 | 16–14 |
| 2 | France | 2 | 1 | 1 | 28 | 30 | −2 | .500 | Advance to quarterfinals | — | — | 14–13 |
| 3 | Georgia | 2 | 0 | 2 | 27 | 30 | −3 | .000 | | — | — | — |

Source: FIBA
Rules for classification: 1) Winning percentage; 2) Head-to-head; 3) Points scored.

Pool B

| Pos | Team | Pld | W | L | PF | PA | PD | PCT | Qualification | (Czech Republic) | (Andorra) | (Slovenia) |
|---|---|---|---|---|---|---|---|---|---|---|---|---|
| 1 | Czech Republic | 2 | 2 | 0 | 33 | 27 | +6 | 1.000 | Advance to quarterfinals | — | 18–13 | — |
| 2 | Andorra | 2 | 1 | 1 | 34 | 35 | −1 | .500 | Advance to quarterfinals | — | — | — |
| 3 | Slovenia | 2 | 0 | 2 | 31 | 36 | −5 | .000 | | 14–15 | 17–21 | — |

Source: FIBA
Rules for classification: 1) Winning percentage; 2) Head-to-head; 3) Points scored.

Pool C

| Pos | Team | Pld | W | L | PF | PA | PD | PCT | Qualification | (Hungary) | (Turkey) | (Latvia) |
|---|---|---|---|---|---|---|---|---|---|---|---|---|
| 1 | Hungary (H) | 2 | 2 | 0 | 37 | 29 | +8 | 1.000 | Advance to quarterfinals | — | 21–15 | 16–14 |
| 2 | Turkey | 2 | 1 | 1 | 36 | 35 | +1 | .500 | Advance to quarterfinals | — | — | 21–14 |
| 3 | Latvia | 2 | 0 | 2 | 28 | 37 | −9 | .000 | | — | — | — |

Source: FIBA
Rules for classification: 1) Winning percentage; 2) Head-to-head; 3) Points scored.
(H) Hosts

Pool D

| Pos | Team | Pld | W | L | PF | PA | PD | PCT | Qualification | (Germany) | (Belgium) | (Serbia) |
|---|---|---|---|---|---|---|---|---|---|---|---|---|
| 1 | Germany | 2 | 2 | 0 | 36 | 27 | +9 | 1.000 | Advance to quarterfinals | — | 20–14 | 16–13 |
| 2 | Belgium | 2 | 1 | 1 | 29 | 28 | +1 | .500 | Advance to quarterfinals | — | — | 15–8 |
| 3 | Serbia | 2 | 0 | 2 | 21 | 31 | −10 | .000 | | — | — | — |

Source: FIBA
Rules for classification: 1) Winning percentage; 2) Head-to-head; 3) Points scored.

==== Knockout stage ====
Quarterfinals
11 September
Romania | 12
Belgium | 13
11 September
Hungary | 14
Andorra | 18
11 September
Czech Republic | 16
Turkey | 20
11 September
Germany | 13
France | 16

Semifinals
11 September
Belgium | 11
Andorra | 5
11 September
Turkey | 12
France | 17

Final
11 September
Belgium | 15
France | 19
Third place
11 September
Andorra | 17
Turkey | 18

==== Final standings ====
| Pos | Team | Pld | W | L | PF |
|---|---|---|---|---|---|
| 1 | France | 5 | 4 | 1 | 80 |
| 2 | Belgium | 5 | 3 | 2 | 68 |
| 3 | Turkey | 5 | 3 | 2 | 86 |
| 4 | Andorra | 5 | 2 | 3 | 74 |
| 5 | Hungary | 3 | 2 | 1 | 51 |
| 6 | Germany | 3 | 2 | 1 | 49 |
| 7 | Czech Republic | 3 | 2 | 1 | 49 |
| 8 | Romania | 3 | 2 | 1 | 45 |
| 9 | Slovenia | 2 | 0 | 2 | 31 |
| 10 | Latvia | 2 | 0 | 2 | 28 |
| 11 | Georgia | 2 | 0 | 2 | 27 |
| 12 | Serbia | 2 | 0 | 2 | 21 |

=== Women's tournament ===
==== Pool play ====
Pool A

| Pos | Team | Pld | W | L | PF | PA | PD | PCT | Qualification | (Hungary) | (Belarus) | (Israel) |
|---|---|---|---|---|---|---|---|---|---|---|---|---|
| 1 | Hungary (H) | 2 | 2 | 0 | 36 | 12 | +24 | 1.000 | Advance to quarterfinals | — | 21–5 | 15–7 |
| 2 | Belarus | 2 | 1 | 1 | 19 | 34 | −15 | .500 | Advance to quarterfinals | — | — | — |
| 3 | Israel | 2 | 0 | 2 | 20 | 29 | −9 | .000 | | — | 13–14 | — |

Source: FIBA
Rules for classification: 1) Winning percentage; 2) Head-to-head; 3) Points scored.
(H) Hosts

Pool B

| Pos | Team | Pld | W | L | PF | PA | PD | PCT | Qualification | (Belgium) | (Russia) | (Netherlands) |
|---|---|---|---|---|---|---|---|---|---|---|---|---|
| 1 | Belgium | 2 | 2 | 0 | 34 | 21 | +13 | 1.000 | Advance to quarterfinals | — | — | — |
| 2 | Russia | 2 | 1 | 1 | 22 | 19 | +3 | .500 | Advance to quarterfinals | 11–13 | — | — |
| 3 | Netherlands | 2 | 0 | 2 | 16 | 32 | −16 | .000 | | 10–21 | 6–11 | — |

Source: FIBA
Rules for classification: 1) Winning percentage; 2) Head-to-head; 3) Points scored.

Pool C

| Pos | Team | Pld | W | L | PF | PA | PD | PCT | Qualification | (Spain) | (Czech Republic) | (Lithuania) |
|---|---|---|---|---|---|---|---|---|---|---|---|---|
| 1 | Spain | 2 | 2 | 0 | 36 | 15 | +21 | 1.000 | Advance to quarterfinals | — | 15–10 | 21–5 |
| 2 | Czech Republic | 2 | 1 | 1 | 25 | 26 | −1 | .500 | Advance to quarterfinals | — | — | 15–11 |
| 3 | Lithuania | 2 | 0 | 2 | 16 | 36 | −20 | .000 | | — | — | — |

Source: FIBA
Rules for classification: 1) Winning percentage; 2) Head-to-head; 3) Points scored.

Pool D

| Pos | Team | Pld | W | L | PF | PA | PD | PCT | Qualification | (France) | (Switzerland) | (Austria) |
|---|---|---|---|---|---|---|---|---|---|---|---|---|
| 1 | France | 2 | 2 | 0 | 29 | 14 | +15 | 1.000 | Advance to quarterfinals | — | 10–6 | 19–8 |
| 2 | Switzerland | 2 | 1 | 1 | 17 | 20 | −3 | .500 | Advance to quarterfinals | — | — | 11–10 |
| 3 | Austria | 2 | 0 | 2 | 18 | 30 | −12 | .000 | | — | — | — |

Source: FIBA
Rules for classification: 1) Winning percentage; 2) Head-to-head; 3) Points scored.

==== Knockout stage ====
Quarterfinals
4 September
Hungary | 11
Switzerland | 7
4 September
Spain | 16
Russia | 17
4 September
Belgium | 10
Czech Republic | 11
4 September
France | 15
Belarus | 11

Semifinals
4 September
Hungary | 13
Russia | 10
4 September
Czech Republic | 7
France | 9

Final
4 September
Hungary | 10
France | 11
Third place
4 September
Russia | 14
Czech Republic | 17

==== Final standings ====
| Pos | Team | Pld | W | L | PF |
|---|---|---|---|---|---|
| 1 | France | 5 | 5 | 0 | 64 |
| 2 | Hungary | 5 | 4 | 1 | 70 |
| 3 | Czech Republic | 5 | 3 | 2 | 60 |
| 4 | Russia | 5 | 2 | 3 | 63 |
| 5 | Spain | 3 | 2 | 1 | 52 |
| 6 | Belgium | 3 | 2 | 1 | 44 |
| 7 | Belarus | 3 | 1 | 2 | 30 |
| 8 | Switzerland | 3 | 1 | 2 | 24 |
| 9 | Israel | 2 | 0 | 2 | 20 |
| 10 | Austria | 2 | 0 | 2 | 18 |
| 11 | Netherlands | 2 | 0 | 2 | 16 |
| 12 | Lithuania | 2 | 0 | 2 | 16 |
