= 2024 FIBA 3x3 Europe Cup – Women's tournament qualification =

The 2024 FIBA 3x3 Europe Cup – Women's tournament qualification took place in June 2024 and decided who qualified for the 2024 FIBA 3x3 Europe Cup – Women's tournament in Vienna.

== Format ==
The hosts, defending champions automatically qualified, plus the 3 highest ranked teams not yet qualified. The other 7 spots were decided by four qualifying tournaments. Three of the tournaments (Bratislava, Bucharest and Copenhagen) had 2 spots on the line, while the Pristina qualifier was dedicated to the small basketball nations and had one spot.

== Qualified teams ==
	Date	Vacancies	Qualified
Host nation	21 February 2024	1	Austria
Defending champions		1	Netherlands
3x3 World Rankings		3	France; Germany; Hungary
(Denmark) Copenhagen Qualifier	7–8 June	2	Spain; Italy
(Kosovo) Pristina Qualifier	8–9 June	1	Azerbaijan
(Slovakia) Bratislava Qualifier	15–16 June	2	Ukraine; Poland
(Romania) Bucharest Qualifier	15–16 June	2	Romania; Latvia
Total		12	

== Copenhagen qualifier ==
The Copenhagen Qualifier was played between 7–8 June.

Pool seeding
Pool A	Pool B
Spain (1); Portugal (4); Croatia (5)	Czech Republic (2); Italy (3); Denmark (6) (H)

=== Pool A ===
Pos	Team	Pld	W	L	PF	PA	PD	Qualification	(Spain)	(Portugal)	(Croatia)
1	Spain	2	2	0	39	26	+13	Semifinals		21–17	18–9
2	Portugal	2	1	1	37	31	+6	Play In			20–10
3	Croatia	2	0	2	19	38	−19	Play In			

Source: FIBA
Rules for classification: 1) Wins; 2) Head-to-head record; 3) Points scored.

=== Pool B ===
Pos	Team	Pld	W	L	PF	PA	PD	Qualification	(Italy)	(Czech Republic)	(Denmark)
1	Italy	2	2	0	28	19	+9	Semifinals			13–11
2	Czech Republic	2	1	1	22	27	−5	Play In	8–15		14–12
3	Denmark (H)	2	0	2	23	27	−4	Play In			

Source: FIBA
Rules for classification: 1) Wins; 2) Head-to-head record; 3) Points scored.
(H) Hosts

=== Knockout stage ===
==== Bracket ====
Play In
8 June
Czech Republic	21
Croatia	14
8 June
Portugal	20
Denmark	16

Semifinals
8 June
Spain	19
Czech Republic	12
8 June
Italy	21
Portugal	16

Qualified Teams
Spain
Italy

== Bratislava qualifier ==
The Bratislava Qualifier was played between 15–16 June.

Pool seeding
Pool A	Pool B
Lithuania (1); Lithuania (4); Slovakia (5) (H)	Poland (2); Ukraine (3); Turkey (6); Estonia (7)

=== Pool A ===
Pos	Team	Pld	W	L	PF	PA	PD	Qualification	(Lithuania)	(Slovakia)	(Switzerland)
1	Lithuania	2	2	0	42	15	+27	Semifinals		21–6	21–9
2	Slovakia (H)	2	1	1	24	36	−12	Play In			
3	Switzerland	2	0	2	24	39	−15	Play In		15–18	

Source: FIBA
Rules for classification: 1) Wins; 2) Head-to-head record; 3) Points scored.
(H) Hosts

=== Pool B ===
Pos	Team	Pld	W	L	PF	PA	PD	Qualification	(Ukraine)	(Poland)	(Turkey)	(Estonia)
1	Ukraine	3	3	0	53	39	+14	Semifinals			19–12	18–15
2	Poland	3	2	1	47	39	+8	Play In	12–16			13–9
3	Turkey	3	1	2	43	52	−9	Play In		14–22		
4	Estonia	3	0	3	35	48	−13				11–17	

Source: FIBA
Rules for classification: 1) Wins; 2) Head-to-head record; 3) Points scored.

=== Knockout stage ===
==== Bracket ====
Play In
16 June
Poland	21
Switzerland	8
16 June
Slovakia	16
Turkey	14

Semifinals
16 June
Lithuania	13
Poland	14
16 June
Ukraine	21
Slovakia	13

Qualified Teams
Poland
Ukraine

== Bucharest qualifier ==
The Bucharest Qualifier took place between the 15–16 June.

Pool seeding
Pool A	Pool B
Israel (1); Greece (4); Slovenia (5)	Romania (2) (H); Latvia (3); Great Britain (6); Georgia (7)

=== Pool A ===
Pos	Team	Pld	W	L	PF	PA	PD	Qualification	(Israel)	(Greece)	(Slovenia)
1	Israel	2	2	0	38	30	+8	Semifinals		19–13	19–17
2	Greece	2	1	1	31	36	−5	Play In			18–17
3	Slovenia	2	0	2	34	37	−3	Play In			

Source: FIBA
Rules for classification: 1) Wins; 2) Head-to-head record; 3) Points scored.

=== Pool B ===
Pos	Team	Pld	W	L	PF	PA	PD	Qualification	(Romania)	(Latvia)	(United Kingdom)	(Georgia (country))
1	Romania (H)	3	3	0	57	33	+24	Semifinals		16–13		20–8
2	Latvia	3	2	1	55	32	+23	Play In			21–13	21–3
3	Great Britain	3	1	2	47	46	+1	Play In	12–21			
4	Georgia	3	0	3	15	63	−48				4–22	

Source: FIBA
Rules for classification: 1) Wins; 2) Head-to-head record; 3) Points scored.
(H) Hosts

=== Knockout stage ===
==== Bracket ====
Play In
16 June
Latvia	16
Slovenia	14
16 June
Greece	11
Great Britain	16

Semifinals
16 June
Israel	12
Latvia	21
16 June
Romania	21
Great Britain	17

Qualified Teams
Latvia
Romania

== Pristina qualifier ==
The Pristina Qualifier took place between the 8–9 June. The Pristina qualifier was dedicated to small basketball nations and had one spot on the line.

Pool seeding
Pool A	Pool B
Azerbaijan (1); Luxembourg (4); Malta (5)	Ireland (2); Kosovo (3) (H); Cyprus (6); Andorra (7)

=== Pool A ===
Pos	Team	Pld	W	L	PF	PA	PD	Qualification	(Azerbaijan)	(Luxembourg)	(Malta)
1	Azerbaijan	2	2	0	38	22	+16	Semifinals		21–8	17–14
2	Luxembourg	2	1	1	29	36	−7	Play In			21–15
3	Malta	2	0	2	29	38	−9	Play In			

Source: FIBA
Rules for classification: 1) Wins; 2) Head-to-head record; 3) Points scored.

=== Pool B ===
Pos	Team	Pld	W	L	PF	PA	PD	Qualification	(Cyprus)	(Republic of Ireland)	(Andorra)	(Kosovo)
1	Cyprus	3	3	0	49	36	+13	Semifinals		16–13		
2	Ireland	3	2	1	52	38	+14	Play In			22–7	17–15
3	Andorra	3	1	2	35	51	−16	Play In	9–16			
4	Kosovo (H)	3	0	3	42	53	−11		14–17		13–19	

Source: FIBA
Rules for classification: 1) Wins; 2) Head-to-head record; 3) Points scored.
(H) Hosts

=== Knockout stage ===
==== Bracket ====
Play In
9 June
Ireland	13
Malta	17
9 June
Luxembourg	21
Andorra	10

Semifinals
9 June
Azerbaijan	15
Malta	10
9 June
Cyprus	18
Luxembourg	16

Final
9 June
Azerbaijan	21
Cyprus	12

== See also ==
- 2024 FIBA 3x3 Europe Cup – Men's tournament qualification
- 2024 FIBA 3x3 Europe Cup – Men's tournament
- Basketball at the 2024 Summer Olympics – Men's 3x3 tournament
- Basketball at the 2024 Summer Olympics – Women's 3x3 tournament
- 2024 FIBA 3x3 AmeriCup – Men's tournament
- 2024 FIBA 3x3 AmeriCup – Women's tournament
- 2024 FIBA 3x3 Asia Cup – Men's tournament
- 2024 FIBA 3x3 Asia Cup – Women's tournament
