= Sweden women's national 3x3 team =

National 3x3 basketball team

Sweden
- FIBA ranking: 21
- FIBA zone: FIBA Europe
- National federation: Swedish Basketball Federation

Europe Cup
- Appearances: 1

The Sweden women's national 3x3 team is a national basketball team of Sweden, administered by the Royal Belgian Basketball Federation. It represents the country in international 3x3 (3 against 3) women's basketball competitions.

== Europe Cup record ==
Year	Position	Pld	W	L
(Romania) 2014 Bucharest	Did not qualify			
(Romania) 2016 Bucharest	Did not qualify			
(Netherlands) 2017 Amsterdam	Did not qualify			
(Romania) 2018 Bucharest	Did not qualify			
(Hungary) 2019 Debrecen	Did not qualify			
(France) 2021 Paris	Did not qualify			
(Austria) 2022 Graz	Did not qualify			
(Israel) 2023 Jerusalem	Did not qualify			
(Austria) 2024 Vienna	Did not qualify			
(Denmark) 2025 Copenhagen	Did not qualify			
(Belgium) 2026 Antwerp	9th	2	1	1
Total	1/11	2	1	1
