= 2025 FIBA 3x3 World Cup – Women's tournament =

International basketball competition in Ulaanbaatar, Mongolia

2025 FIBA 3x3 World Cup
Tournament details
- Host country: Mongolia
- City: Ulaanbaatar
- Dates: 23–29 June
- Teams: 20

Final positions
- Champions: Netherlands (1st title)
- Runners-up: Mongolia
- Third place: Canada
- Fourth place: Poland

The 2025 FIBA 3x3 World Cup was held in Ulaanbaatar, Mongolia from 23 to 29 June 2025, and contested by 20 teams.

The Netherlands won their first title after a finals win over Mongolia.

== Qualified teams ==
The host, along the winners of the four Zone Cups of four FIBA zones, and the three winners of the qualifiers also qualify. The other twelve teams qualify based on the FIBA National Federation rankings.

Competition	Dates	Host	Vacancies	Qualified
Host nation	—N/a		1	Mongolia
Federation rankings	—N/a		12	Austria; China; Czech Republic; France; Japan; Germany; Hungary; Italy; Netherlands; Poland; Ukraine; United States
2024 FIBA 3x3 Asia Cup	27–31 March 2024	Singapore	1	Australia
2024 FIBA 3x3 Europe Cup	22–25 August 2024	(Austria) Vienna	1	Spain
2024 FIBA 3x3 AmeriCup	13–15 December 2024	(Puerto Rico) San Juan	1	Canada
2024 FIBA 3x3 Africa Cup	29 November – 1 December 2024	(Madagascar) Antananarivo	1	Madagascar
FIBA 3x3 World Cup Qualifier	24–25 May 2025	(Azerbaijan) Baku	3	Brazil; Chile; Latvia

== Players ==
Seed	Team	Players			
1	China	Li Wenxia	Yang Hengyu	Zhang Wanglai	Zhou Mengyun
2	Netherlands	Janis Boonstra	Noortje Driessen	Ilse Kuijt	Evelien Lutje Schipholt
3	France	Camille Droguet	Hortense Limouzin	Marie Mané	Marie Milapie
4	Spain	Gracia Alonso de Armiño	Juana Camilión	Vega Gimeno	Sandra Ygueravide
5	Germany	Ama Degbeon	Elisa Mevius	Sarah Polleros	Laura Zolper
6	Canada	Kacie Bosch	Cassandra Brown	Paige Crozon	Saicha Grant-Allen
7	United States	Morgan Maly	Sarah Strong	Mikaylah Williams	Sahara Williams
8	Poland	Klaudia Gertchen	Anna Pawłowska	Weronika Telenga	Aleksandra Zięmborska
9	Italy	Raelin D'Alie	Sofia Frustaci	Meriem Nasraoui	Beatrice Olajide
10	Czech Republic	Kristýna Brabencová	Kateřina Galíčková	Petra Malíková	Karolina Šotolová
11	Hungary	Dorottya Budácsik	Réka Mányoky	Klaudia Papp	Orsolya Tóth
12	Mongolia	Bat-Erdeniin Ariuntsetseg	Mönkhsaikhany Tserenlkham	Nyamjavyn Nandinkhüsel	Onolbaataryn Khulan
13	Ukraine	Daria Dubniuk	Anzhelika Liashko	Miriam Uro-Nilie	Tetiana Yurkevichus
14	Austria	Anja Fuchs-Robetin	Sina Elke Höllerl	Rebekka Kalaydjiev	Sigrid Koizar
15	Japan	Aoi Katsura	Kiho Miyashita	Fuyuko Takahashi	Miku Takahashi
16	Australia	Anneli Maley	Miela Sowah	Marena Whittle	Alex Wilson
17	Chile	Gabi Ahumada	Ziomara Morrison	Fernanda Ovalle	Francisca Salvatierra
18	Latvia	Marta Leimane	Marta Miščenko	Digna Strautmane	Ketija Vihmane
19	Brazil	Gabriella D'Arrigo	Gabriela Guimarães	Kawanni Silva	Luana de Souza
20	Madagascar	Sydonie Andriamihajanirina	Harisoa Hajanirina	Minaoharisoa Jaofera	Rondro Raherimanana

== Preliminary round ==
The pools were announced on 26 May 2025.

All times are local (UTC+8).

=== Pool A ===
Pos	Team	Pld	W	L	PF	PA	PR	Qualification
1	Australia	4	4	0	84	54	1.556	Quarterfinals
2	Poland	4	3	1	79	59	1.339	Round of 16
3	China	4	2	2	70	66	1.061	Round of 16
4	Italy	4	1	3	60	73	0.822	
5	Madagascar	4	0	4	44	85	0.518	

Source: FIBA
Rules for classification: 1) Wins; 2) Head-to-head record; 3) Points scored.

23 June 2025
11:00

Boxscore

China	12–21	Australia
Pts: Yang, Zhou 5		Pts: Wilson 8

Sükhbaatar Square, Ulaanbaatar
Referees: Gonzalo Paz Chiapponi (URU), Deanna Jackson (USA)

23 June 2025
11:25

Boxscore

Madagascar	11–21	Italy
Pts: Raherimanana 6		Pts: D'Alie 16

Sükhbaatar Square, Ulaanbaatar
Referees: Najib Chajiddine (FRA), Brigitta Csabai-Kaskötõ (HUN)

23 June 2025
12:40

Boxscore

Australia	21–18	Poland
Pts: Whittle 8		Pts: Zięmborska 9

Sükhbaatar Square, Ulaanbaatar
Referees: Gonzalo Paz Chiapponi (URU), Brigitta Csabai-Kaskötõ (HUN)

23 June 2025
13:05

Boxscore

Italy	11–20	China
Pts: D'Alie 9		Pts: Yang 10

Sükhbaatar Square, Ulaanbaatar
Referees: Brigitta Csabai-Kaskötõ (HUN), Deanna Jackson (USA)

23 June 2025
14:30

Boxscore

Poland	21–13	Madagascar
Pts: Gertchen 9		Pts: Raherimanana 5

Sükhbaatar Square, Ulaanbaatar
Referees: Brigitta Csabai-Kaskötõ (HUN), Gonzalo Paz Chiapponi (URU)

25 June 2025
11:00

Boxscore

Australia	21–5	Madagascar
Pts: Wilson 8		Pts: Hajanirina 4

Sükhbaatar Square, Ulaanbaatar
Referees: Deanna Jackson (USA), Dorothy Okatch (BOT)

25 June 2025
11:25

Boxscore

China	16–19	Poland
Pts: Yang 6		Pts: Zięmborska 8

Sükhbaatar Square, Ulaanbaatar
Referees: Najib Chajiddine (FRA), Dorothy Okatch (BOT)

25 June 2025
12:40

Boxscore

Italy	19–21	Australia
Pts: D'Alie, Nasraoui 7		Pts: Wilson 10

Sükhbaatar Square, Ulaanbaatar
Referees: Najib Chajiddine (FRA), Alex Talisainen (EST)

25 June 2025
13:05

Boxscore

Madagascar	15–22	China
Pts: Raherimanana 6		Pts: Zhou 9

Sükhbaatar Square, Ulaanbaatar
Referees: Deanna Jackson (USA), Dorothy Okatch (BOT)

25 June 2025
14:30

Boxscore

Poland	21–9	Italy
Pts: Telenga 8		Pts: D'Alie 4

Sükhbaatar Square, Ulaanbaatar
Referees: Najib Chajiddine (FRA), Alex Talisainen (EST)

=== Pool B ===
Pos	Team	Pld	W	L	PF	PA	PR	Qualification
1	United States	4	4	0	78	37	2.108	Quarterfinals
2	Japan	4	3	1	71	67	1.060	Round of 16
3	Netherlands	4	2	2	69	64	1.078	Round of 16
4	Czech Republic	4	1	3	66	79	0.835	
5	Chile	4	0	4	47	84	0.560	

Source: FIBA
Rules for classification: 1) Wins; 2) Head-to-head record; 3) Points scored.

24 June 2025
11:50

Boxscore

Chile	16–21	Czech Republic
Pts: Ovalle 9		Pts: Šotolová 9

Sükhbaatar Square, Ulaanbaatar
Referees: Najib Chajiddine (FRA), Deanna Jackson (USA)

24 June 2025
12:15

Boxscore

Netherlands	16–21	Japan
Pts: Lutje Schipholt 6		Pts: F. Takahashi 12

Sükhbaatar Square, Ulaanbaatar
Referees: Shi Qirong (CHN), Alex Talisainen (EST)

24 June 2025
13:40

Boxscore

United States	21–12	Czech Republic
Pts: Strong 12		Pts: Galíčková, Šotolová 4

Sükhbaatar Square, Ulaanbaatar
Referees: Najib Chajiddine (FRA), Alex Talisainen (EST)

24 June 2025
14:05

Boxscore

Japan	21–12	Chile
Pts: F. Takahashi 7		Pts: Morrison 9

Sükhbaatar Square, Ulaanbaatar
Referees: Najib Chajiddine (FRA), Shi Qirong (CHN)

24 June 2025
16:20

Boxscore

Netherlands	11–15	United States
Pts: Lutje Schipholt 6		Pts: Strong 7

Sükhbaatar Square, Ulaanbaatar
Referees: Dorothy Okatch (BOT), Vladimir Vesković (SRB)

26 June 2025
11:50

Boxscore

Japan	8–21	United States
Pts: Miyashita F. Takahashi 3		Pts: Strong 8

Sükhbaatar Square, Ulaanbaatar
Referees: Shi Qirong (CHN), Alex Talisainen (EST)

26 June 2025
12:15

Boxscore

Chile	13–21	Netherlands
Pts: Morrison 8		Pts: Driessen 11

Sükhbaatar Square, Ulaanbaatar
Referees: Brigitta Csabai-Kaskötő (HUN), Alex Talisainen (EST)

26 June 2025
13:40

Boxscore

Czech Republic	18–21	Japan
Pts: Galíčková 6		Pts: Katsura 9

Sükhbaatar Square, Ulaanbaatar
Referees: Gonzalo Paz Chiapponi (URU), Alex Talisainen (EST)

26 June 2025
14:05

Boxscore

United States	21–6	Chile
Pts: Strong, M. Williams 6		Pts: Ovalle 3

Sükhbaatar Square, Ulaanbaatar
Referees: Brigitta Csabai-Kaskötõ (HUN), Shi Qirong (CHN)

26 June 2025
16:20

Boxscore

Czech Republic	15–21	Netherlands
Pts: Šotolová 11		Pts: Driessen 9

Sükhbaatar Square, Ulaanbaatar
Referees: Najib Chajiddine (FRA), Dorothy Okatch (BOT)

=== Pool C ===
Pos	Team	Pld	W	L	PF	PA	PR	Qualification
1	France	4	4	0	69	58	1.190	Quarterfinals
2	Hungary	4	2 (Note: Canada 14–16 Hungary)	2	52	53	0.981	Round of 16
3	Canada	4	2	2	64	55	1.164	Round of 16
4	Austria	4	1 (Note: Austria 17–14 Latvia)	3	58	62	0.935	
5	Latvia	4	1	3	53	62	0.855	

Source: FIBA
Rules for classification: 1) Wins; 2) Head-to-head record; 3) Points scored.
Notes:

23 June 2025
14:55

Boxscore

Canada	17–10	Latvia
Pts: Grant-Allen 9		Pts: Miščenko 5

Sükhbaatar Square, Ulaanbaatar
Referees: Najib Chajiddine (FRA), Deanna Jackson (USA)

23 June 2025
20:20

Boxscore

Hungary	16–21	France
Pts: Mányoky 7		Pts: Droguet 9

Sükhbaatar Square, Ulaanbaatar
Referees: Dorothy Okatch (BOT), Shi Qirong (CHN)

23 June 2025
20:45

Boxscore

Austria	15–20	Canada
Pts: Höllerl 6		Pts: Brown 9

Sükhbaatar Square, Ulaanbaatar
Referees: Alex Talisainen (EST), Vladimir Vesković (SRB)

23 June 2025
22:00

Boxscore

Latvia	15–10	Hungary
Pts: Leimane 5		Pts: Papp 4

Sükhbaatar Square, Ulaanbaatar
Referees: Shi Qirong (CHN), Alex Talisainen (EST)

23 June 2025
22:25

Boxscore

France	16–15	Austria
Pts: Mané 7		Pts: Fuchs-Robetin 9

Sükhbaatar Square, Ulaanbaatar
Referees: Dorothy Okatch (BOT), Alex Talisainen (EST)

25 June 2025
14:55

Boxscore

Hungary	12–11	Austria
Pts: Papp 6		Pts: Höllerl 5

Sükhbaatar Square, Ulaanbaatar
Referees: Najib Chajiddine (FRA), Dorothy Okatch (BOT)

25 June 2025
17:10

Boxscore

France	14–13	Canada
Pts: Milapie 6		Pts: Brown 6

Sükhbaatar Square, Ulaanbaatar
Referees: Gonzalo Paz Chiapponi (URU), Vladimir Vesković (SRB)

25 June 2025
17:35

Boxscore

Austria	17–14	Latvia
Pts: Höllerl 11		Pts: Miščenko, Strautmane 4

Sükhbaatar Square, Ulaanbaatar
Referees: Gonzalo Paz Chiapponi (URU), Shi Qirong (CHN)

25 June 2025
19:00

Boxscore

Canada	14–16	Hungary
Pts: Crozon, Grant-Allen 5		Pts: Mányoky 6

Sükhbaatar Square, Ulaanbaatar
Referees: Shi Qirong (CHN), Vladimir Vesković (SRB)

25 June 2025
19:25

Boxscore

Latvia	14–18	France
Pts: Miščenko 5		Pts: Droguet, Limouzin 6

Sükhbaatar Square, Ulaanbaatar
Referees: Gonzalo Paz Chiapponi (URU), Brigitta Csabai-Kaskötõ (HUN)

=== Pool D ===
Pos	Team	Pld	W	L	PF	PA	PR	Qualification
1	Spain	4	4	0	78	47	1.660	Quarterfinals
2	Mongolia (H)	4	3	1	62	66	0.939	Round of 16
3	Germany	4	2	2	66	65	1.015	Round of 16
4	Brazil	4	1	3	65	74	0.878	
5	Ukraine	4	0	4	62	81	0.765	

Source: FIBA
Rules for classification: 1) Wins; 2) Head-to-head record; 3) Points scored.
(H) Hosts

24 June 2025
16:45

Boxscore

Germany	18–16	Brazil
Pts: Mevius 6		Pts: D'Arrigo 7

Sükhbaatar Square, Ulaanbaatar
Referees: Brigitta Csabai-Kaskötõ (HUN), Dorothy Okatch (BOT)

24 June 2025
18:00

Boxscore

Spain	21–10	Ukraine
Pts: Gimeno 8		Pts: three players 3

Sükhbaatar Square, Ulaanbaatar
Referees: Gonzalo Paz Chiapponi (URU), Dorothy Okatch (BOT)

24 June 2025
18:25

Boxscore

Brazil	14–16	Mongolia
Pts: D'Arrigo 4		Pts: Bat-Erdene 7

Sükhbaatar Square, Ulaanbaatar
Referees: Gonzalo Paz Chiapponi (URU), Brigitta Csabai-Kaskötõ (HUN)

24 June 2025
19:50

Boxscore

Ukraine	16–21	Germany
Pts: Dubniuk 7		Pts: Polleros 8

Sükhbaatar Square, Ulaanbaatar
Referees: Brigitta Csabai-Kaskötõ (HUN), Vladimir Vesković (SRB)

24 June 2025
20:15

Boxscore

Mongolia	10–22	Spain
Pts: Khulan 4		Pts: Ygueravide 11

Sükhbaatar Square, Ulaanbaatar
Referees: Gonzalo Paz Chiapponi (URU), Dorothy Okatch (BOT)

26 June 2025
16:45

Boxscore

Brazil	14–20	Spain
Pts: Guimarães 9		Pts: Gimeno 10

Sükhbaatar Square, Ulaanbaatar
Referees: Najib Chajiddine (FRA), Dorothy Okatch (BOT)

26 June 2025
18:00

Boxscore

Germany	14–18	Mongolia
Pts: Degbeon 5		Pts: Bat-Erdene 7

Sükhbaatar Square, Ulaanbaatar
Referees: Najib Chajiddine (FRA), Deanna Jackson (USA)

26 June 2025
18:25

Boxscore

Ukraine	20–21	Brazil
Pts: Liashko 8		Pts: De Souza 10

Sükhbaatar Square, Ulaanbaatar
Referees: Dorothy Okatch (BOT), Vladimir Vesković (SRB)

26 June 2025
19:50

Boxscore

Spain	15–13	Germany
Pts: Ygueravide 7		Pts: Mevius 5

Sükhbaatar Square, Ulaanbaatar
Referees: Najib Chajiddine (FRA), Vladimir Vesković (SRB)

26 June 2025
20:15

Boxscore

Mongolia	18–16 (OT)	Ukraine
Pts: Khulan 10		Pts: Uro-Nilie 10

Sükhbaatar Square, Ulaanbaatar
Referees: Deanna Jackson (USA), Dorothy Okatch (BOT)

== Knockout stage ==
=== Bracket ===
Round of 16
27 June
Hungary	9
Netherlands	21
27 June
Japan	6
Canada	18
27 June
Poland	20
Germany	18
27 June
Mongolia (OT)	21
China	19

Quarter-finals
28 June
Australia	11
Netherlands	21
28 June
Canada	11
Spain	10
28 June
France	15
Poland	19
28 June
Mongolia	18
United States	15

Semi-finals
29 June
Netherlands	21
Canada	15
29 June
Poland	17
Mongolia (OT)	18

Final
29 June
Netherlands	15
Mongolia	9
Third place
29 June
Canada	21
Poland	9

=== Round of 16 ===
27 June 2025
16:00

Boxscore

Hungary	9–21	Netherlands
Pts: Mányoky 4		Pts: Boonstra 9

Sükhbaatar Square, Ulaanbaatar
Referees: Shi Qirong (CHN), Alex Talisainen (EST)

27 June 2025
16:25

Boxscore

Japan	6–18	Canada
Pts: Miyashita F. Takahashi 2		Pts: Brown 8

Sükhbaatar Square, Ulaanbaatar
Referees: Deanna Jackson (USA), Dorothy Okatch (BOT)

27 June 2025
18:00

Boxscore

Poland	20–18	Germany
Pts: Telenga 9		Pts: Mevius 7

Sükhbaatar Square, Ulaanbaatar
Referees: Gonzalo Paz Chiapponi (URU), Brigitta Csabai-Kaskötő (HUN)

27 June 2025
18:25

Boxscore

Mongolia	21–19 (OT)	China
Pts: Ariuntsetseg 9		Pts: Yang, Zhang 6

Sükhbaatar Square, Ulaanbaatar
Referees: Najib Chajiddine (FRA), Dorothy Okatch (BOT)

=== Quarterfinals ===
28 June 2025
17:00

Boxscore

Australia	11–21	Netherlands
Pts: Whittle 5		Pts: Boonstra, Schipholt 6

Sükhbaatar Square, Ulaanbaatar
Referees: Dorothy Okatch (BOT), Vladimir Vesković (SRB)

28 June 2025
17:25

Boxscore

Canada	11–10	Spain
Pts: Grant-Allen 6		Pts: Gimeno 5

Sükhbaatar Square, Ulaanbaatar
Referees: Gonzalo Paz Chiapponi (URU), Deanna Jackson (USA)

28 June 2025
19:20

Boxscore

Mongolia	18–15	United States
Pts: Khulan 9		Pts: M. Williams, Strong 5

Sükhbaatar Square, Ulaanbaatar
Referees: Brigitta Csabai-Kaskötő (HUN), Alex Talisainen (EST)

28 June 2025
19:45

Boxscore

France	15–19	Poland
Pts: Mané 5		Pts: Zięmborska 11

Sükhbaatar Square, Ulaanbaatar
Referees: Dorothy Okatch (BOT), Shi Qirong (CHN)

=== Semifinals ===
29 June 2025
17:00

Boxscore

Netherlands	21–15	Canada
Pts: Driessen 9		Pts: Crozon 10

Sükhbaatar Square, Ulaanbaatar
Referees: Dorothy Okatch (BOT), Shi Qirong (CHN)

29 June 2025
17:25

Boxscore

Poland	17–18 (OT)	Mongolia
Pts: Telenga 6		Pts: Ariuntsetseg 11

Sükhbaatar Square, Ulaanbaatar
Referees: Brigitta Csabai-Kaskötõ (HUN), Vladimir Vesković (SRB)

=== Third place game ===
29 June 2025
19:00

Boxscore

Canada	21–9	Poland
Pts: Crozon 13		Pts: Pawłowska, Telenga 3

Sükhbaatar Square, Ulaanbaatar
Referees: Dorothy Okatch (BOT), Shi Qirong (CHN)

=== Final ===
29 June 2025
20:00

Boxscore

Netherlands	15–9	Mongolia
Pts: Driessen 6		Pts: Khulan 4

Sükhbaatar Square, Ulaanbaatar
Referees: Brigitta Csabai-Kaskötõ (HUN), Alex Talisainen (EST)

== Final standings ==
Rank	Team	Record
1st place, gold medalist(s)	Netherlands	6–2
2nd place, silver medalist(s)	Mongolia	6–2
3rd place, bronze medalist(s)	Canada	5–3
4	Poland	5–3
5	Australia	4–1
6	United States	4–1
7	Spain	4–1
8	France	4–1
9	Japan	3–2
10	China	2–3
11	Germany	2–3
12	Hungary	2–3
13	Czech Republic	1–3
14	Brazil	1–3
15	Italy	1–3
16	Austria	1–3
17	Latvia	1–3
18	Ukraine	0–4
19	Chile	0–4
20	Madagascar	0–4

== Statistics and awards ==
=== Statistical leaders ===
Name	Points
(Mongolia) Bat-Erdeniin Ariuntsetseg	44
(Netherlands) Noortje Driessen	43
(Poland) Aleksandra Zięmborska	42
(United States) Sarah Strong	38
(Canada) Saicha Grant-Allen	38
(Canada) Paige Crozon	38
(Mongolia) Onolbaataryn Khulan	38

=== Awards ===
The awards were announced on 29 June 2025.

All-Star team
(Netherlands) Noortje Driessen
(Mongolia) Onolbaataryn Khulan
(Canada) Saicha Grant-Allen
MVP
(Netherlands) Noortje Driessen
