= 2016 FIBA 3x3 Under-18 World Championships =

2016 FIBA 3x3 Under-18 World Championship Чемпионат мира по баскетболу 3x3 среди юношей до 18 лет 2016 FIBA 3x3 18 жасқа дейінгі әлем чемпионаты

Tournament information
- Host: Kazakhstan
- Venue: 1
- Teams: 40
- Website: www.fiba.com/world/3x3u18/2016

The 2016 FIBA 3x3 Under-18 World Championship was an international 3x3 basketball event hosted in Kazakhstan. It featured separate competitions for men's and women's under-18 national teams. The tournament was held in Astana in front of the Astana Opera. It was co-organized by the FIBA.

== Participating teams ==
The FIBA 3x3 Federation Ranking was used as basis to determine the participating FIBA member associations. The winners of both the men's and women's tournaments of the 2014 edition, New Zealand and France respectively automatically qualifies.

=== Men ===
- Andorra
- Argentina
- Belgium
- Brazil
- China
- Egypt
- Georgia
- Hungary
- Indonesia
- Italy
- Kazakhstan
- Netherlands
- New Zealand
- Philippines
- Qatar
- Romania
- Slovenia
- Spain
- Turkey
- Uruguay

=== Women ===
- Andorra
- China
- Czech Republic
- Egypt
- France
- Germany
- Guatemala
- Hungary
- Israel
- Italy
- Kazakhstan
- Netherlands
- New Zealand
- Poland
- Spain
- Tunisia
- Turkey
- United Arab Emirates
- United States
- Venezuela

== See also ==
- FIBA 3x3 U18 World Cup
