= Basketball in Andorra =

Basketball in Andorra is organized by the Andorran Basketball Federation (Catalan: Federació Andorrana de Basquetbol).

Andorran national teams participates in FIBA Europe competitions. The senior teams play in Division C and also in the Games of the Small States of Europe.

== National league ==
Andorra has got also an amateur men league called Lliga Andorrana de Bàsquet (Andorran Basketball League). There are only five teams participating in this competition on 2010-11 season. They play a round-robin regular season and later, the champion is determine in the playoffs.

There is also a professional basketball club called BC Andorra, which plays in Liga ACB, the top level of Spanish basketball.

=== Clubs in Lliga Andorrana de Bàsquet 2011–12 ===
- Bàsquet Femení Andorra (women's team)
- BC Encamp
- BC Principat
- Filand
- Insitu B52 Bàsquet
- UE Engordany

== See also ==
- Andorran Basketball Federation
- Andorra national basketball team
