= Belgium women's national 3x3 team =

National 3x3 basketball team

Belgium
- FIBA ranking: 58
- FIBA zone: FIBA Europe
- National federation: Basketball Belgium

World Cup
- Appearances: 2
- Medals: Bronze(2014)

Europe Cup
- Appearances: 5
- Medals: Bronze (2014)

The Belgium women's national 3x3 team is a national basketball team of Belgium, administered by the Royal Belgian Basketball Federation. It represents the country in international 3x3 (3 against 3) women's basketball competitions.

== Tournament record ==
=== World Cup ===
Year	Position	Pld	W	L
(Greece) 2012 Athens	Did not qualify			
(Russia) 2014 Moscow	3rd	9	8	1
(China) 2016 Guangzhou	Did not qualify			
(France) 2017 Nantes	Did not qualify			
(Philippines) 2018 Bocaue	Did not qualify			
(Netherlands) 2019 Amsterdam	Did not qualify			
(Belgium) 2022 Antwerp	8th	5	3	2
(Austria) 2023 Vienna	did not qualify			
(Mongolia) 2025 Ulaanbaatar	did not qualify			
(Poland) 2026 Warsaw	to be determined			
2027 Singapore	to be determined			
Total	2/11	14	11	3

=== Europe Cup ===
Year	Position	Pld	W	L
(Romania) 2014 Bucharest	3rd	6	5	1
(Romania) 2016 Bucharest	11th	2	0	2
(Netherlands) 2017 Amsterdam	Did not qualify			
(Romania) 2018 Bucharest	7th	3	1	2
(Hungary) 2019 Debrecen	Did not qualify			
(France) 2021 Paris	11th	2	0	2
(Austria) 2022 Graz	Did not qualify			
(Israel) 2023 Jerusalem	Did not qualify			
(Austria) 2024 Vienna	Did not qualify			
(Denmark) 2025 Copenhagen	Did not qualify			
(Belgium) 2026 Antwerp	7th	3	1	2
Total	5/11	16	7	9

== See also ==
- Belgium men's national 3x3 team
- Belgium women's national basketball team
