= 2026 FIBA 3x3 Europe Cup – Women's tournament =

Tournament details
- Host country: Belgium
- City: Antwerp
- Dates: 11–13 September
- Teams: 12

Final positions
- Champions: Netherlands (3rd title)
- Runners-up: Spain
- Third place: Azerbaijan
- Fourth place: Slovenia

Tournament statistics
- MVP: (Netherlands) Noortje Driessen

The 2026 FIBA 3x3 Europe Cup was the 11th edition of this continental championship. The event was held in Antwerp, Belgium from 11 to 13 September 2026.

The Netherlands won their third title with a win over Spain.

== Qualification ==
12 teams participated.

| | Vacancies | Qualified |
|---|---|---|
| Host nation | 1 | Belgium |
| Defending champions | 1 | Netherlands |
| 3x3 World Rankings | 5 | Czech Republic; France; Germany; Poland; Spain |
| Slovakia Qualifier | 2 | Hungary; Slovenia |
| Romania Qualifier | 2 | Sweden; Ukraine |
| Kosovo Qualifier | 1 | Azerbaijan |
| Total | 12 | |

== Preliminary round ==
The pools were announced on 7 July 2026.

=== Pool A ===
| Pos | Team | Pld | W | L | PF | PA | PR | Qualification | NED | AZE | UKR |
|---|---|---|---|---|---|---|---|---|---|---|---|
| 1 | Netherlands | 2 | 2 | 0 | 40 | 26 | 1.538 | Quarterfinals | | 21–12 | 19–14 |
| 2 | Azerbaijan | 2 | 1 | 1 | 32 | 28 | 1.143 | Quarterfinals | | | |
| 3 | Ukraine | 2 | 0 | 2 | 21 | 39 | 0.538 | | | 7–20 | |

Source: FIBA
Legend: Blue = home team win; Yellow = draw; Red = away team win.
Rules for classification: 1) Wins; 2) Head-to-head record; 3) Points scored.

=== Pool B ===
| Pos | Team | Pld | W | L | PF | PA | PR | Qualification | ESP | SLO | HUN |
|---|---|---|---|---|---|---|---|---|---|---|---|
| 1 | Spain | 2 | 2 | 0 | 40 | 23 | 1.739 | Quarterfinals | | 21–9 | 19–14 |
| 2 | Slovenia | 2 | 1 | 1 | 26 | 36 | 0.722 | Quarterfinals | | | |
| 3 | Hungary | 2 | 0 | 2 | 29 | 36 | 0.806 | | | 15–17 | |

Source: FIBA
Legend: Blue = home team win; Yellow = draw; Red = away team win.
Rules for classification: 1) Wins; 2) Head-to-head record; 3) Points scored.

=== Pool C ===
| Pos | Team | Pld | W | L | PF | PA | PR | Qualification | FRA | CZE | SWE |
|---|---|---|---|---|---|---|---|---|---|---|---|
| 1 | France | 2 | 1 | 1 | 34 | 23 | 1.478 | Quarterfinals | | 14–15 | 20–8 |
| 2 | Czech Republic | 2 | 1 | 1 | 27 | 29 | 0.931 | Quarterfinals | | | 12–15 |
| 3 | Sweden | 2 | 1 | 1 | 23 | 32 | 0.719 | | | | |

Source: FIBA
Legend: Blue = home team win; Yellow = draw; Red = away team win.
Rules for classification: 1) Wins; 2) Head-to-head record; 3) Points scored.

=== Pool D ===
| Pos | Team | Pld | W | L | PF | PA | PR | Qualification | GER | BEL | POL |
|---|---|---|---|---|---|---|---|---|---|---|---|
| 1 | Germany | 2 | 2 | 0 | 35 | 23 | 1.522 | Quarterfinals | | 14–8 | 21–15 |
| 2 | Belgium (H) | 2 | 1 | 1 | 26 | 29 | 0.897 | Quarterfinals | | | |
| 3 | Poland | 2 | 0 | 2 | 30 | 39 | 0.769 | | | 15–18 | |

Source: FIBA
Legend: Blue = home team win; Yellow = draw; Red = away team win.
Rules for classification: 1) Wins; 2) Head-to-head record; 3) Points scored.
(H) Hosts

== Knockout stage ==
Quarter-finals
13 September
Netherlands | 21
Czech Republic | 3
13 September
Germany | 9
Slovenia | 17
13 September
Spain | 20
Belgium | 9
13 September
France | 15
Azerbaijan | 20

Semi-finals
13 September
Netherlands | 19
Slovenia | 15
13 September
Spain | 20
Azerbaijan | 16

Final
13 September
Netherlands | 16
Spain | 13
Third place
13 September
Slovenia | 18
Azerbaijan | 21

== Final ranking ==
| Rank | Team | Record |
|---|---|---|
| 1st place, gold medalist(s) | Netherlands | 5–0 |
| 2nd place, silver medalist(s) | Spain | 4–1 |
| 3rd place, bronze medalist(s) | Azerbaijan | 3–2 |
| 4 | Slovenia | 2–3 |
| 5 | Germany | 2–1 |
| 6 | France | 1–2 |
| 7 | Belgium | 1–2 |
| 8 | Czech Republic | 1–2 |
| 9 | Sweden | 1–1 |
| 10 | Poland | 0–2 |
| 11 | Hungary | 0–2 |
| 12 | Ukraine | 0–2 |
