= Kakizaki =

Kakizaki may refer to:

- Kakizaki (surname), a Japanese surname
- Kakizaki, Niigata, a former town in Nakakubiki District, Niigata Prefecture, Japan
- Kakizaki Station, a railway station in Jōetsu, Niigata Prefecture, Japan
