= Kakizaki (surname) =

Kakizaki (written: 柿崎 or 蠣崎) is a Japanese surname. Notable people with the surname include:

- Kakizaki Hakyo (蠣崎 波響, 1764–1826), Japanese samurai
- Hiroe Kakizaki (柿崎 宏江, born 1969), Japanese women's basketball player
- Junichi Kakizaki (柿崎 順一, born 1971), Japanese artist, sculptor, and installation artist
- Kakizaki Kageie (柿崎 景家, died 1575), Japanese samurai
