= Chanson V-Magic =

Chanson V-Magic シャンソンVマジック
- League: Women's Japan Basketball League
- Founded: 1962
- Arena: Konohana Arena
- Capacity: 4,000
- Location: Shizuoka, Shizuoka
- Ownership: Chanson Cosmetics, Inc.
- Championships: 16
- Website: vmagic.chanson.co.jp
Home	Away	Third

The Chanson V-Magic (シャンソンVマジック, Shanson V-Majikku) are a Japanese professional basketball team based in Shizuoka, Shizuoka. The V-Magic compete in the "Premier" first division of the Women's Japan Basketball League (WJBL).

== Notable players ==
- Anne Donovan
- Maki Eguchi
- Saori Fujiyoshi
- Ha Eun-ju
- Aki Ichijō
- Sachiko Ishikawa
- Tammy Jackson
- Hiroe Kakizaki
- Takako Katō
- Miyuki Kawamura
- Kumi Watanabe (née Kubota)
- Satomi Miki
- Sanae Motokawa
- Kana Motoyama
- Chikako Murakami
- Mutsuko Nagata
- Akemi Okazato
- Takami Takeuchi
- Mayumi Yoshiyama
- Cassandra Brown

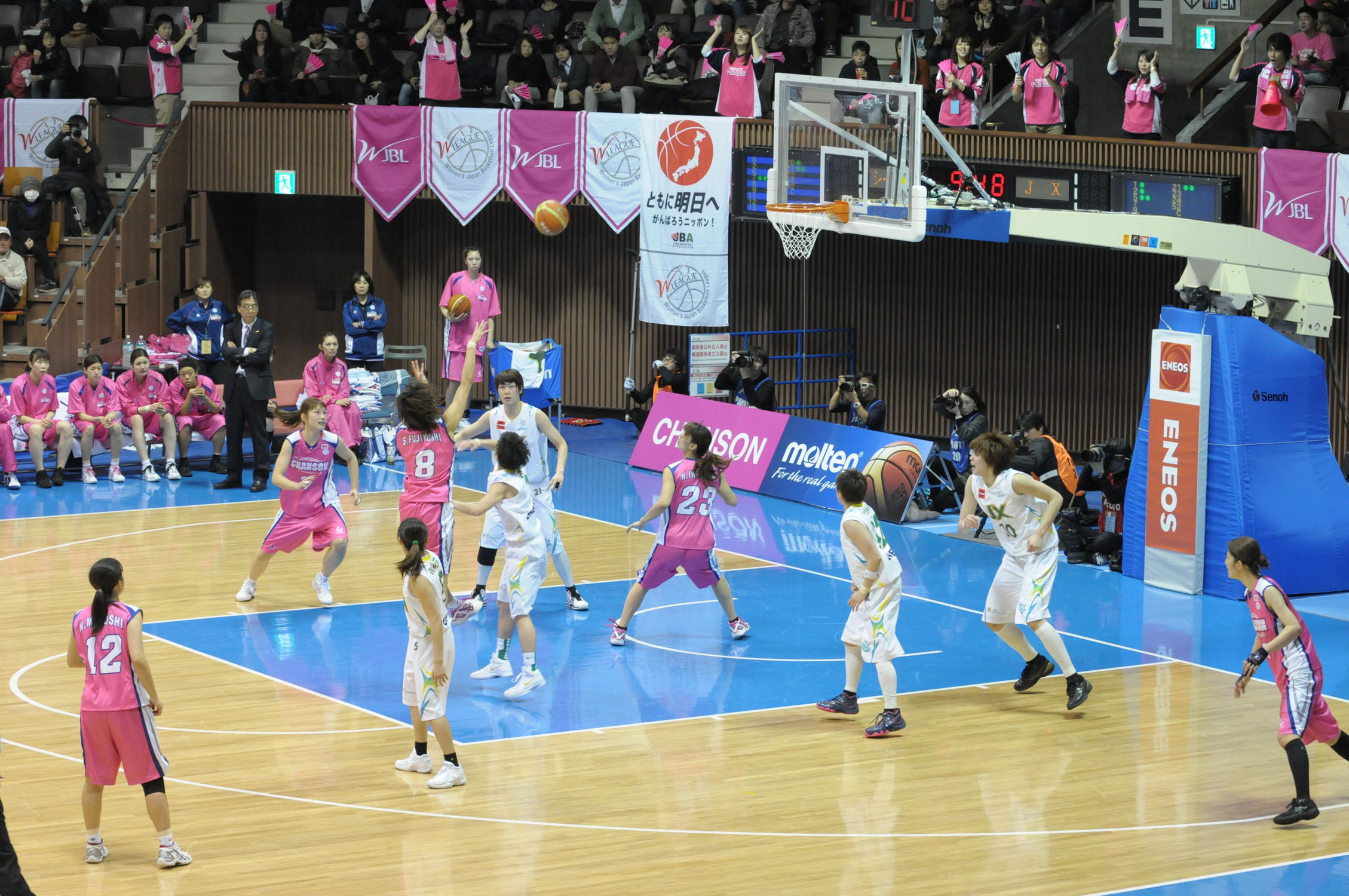

== Venues ==
- Shizuoka Prefectural Budokan
- Shimizu General Sports Park Gymnasium
- Mishima Citizen's Gymnasium
- Inasa General Gymnasium
- Welpia Nagaizumi
