= Cassandra Brown =

Canadian basketball player (born 1992)

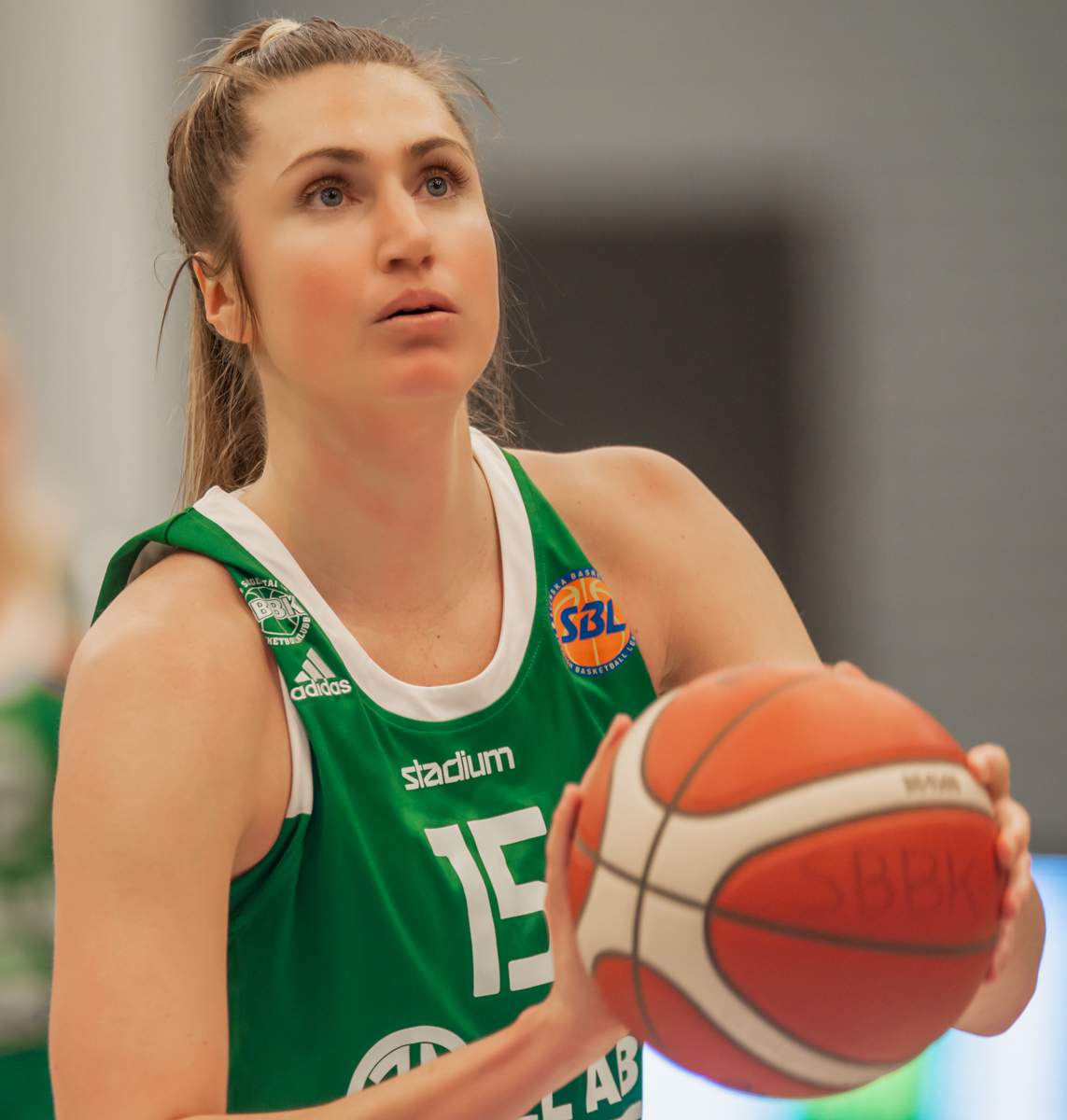
- Brown with Södertälje BBK in 2021

Personal information
- Born: June 16, 1992 (age 34) Vernon, British Columbia, Canada
- Listed height: 6 ft 2 in (1.88 m)

Career information
- College: Portland
- Playing career: 2015–present
- Position: Small forward

Career history
- 2015–2016: Gorzów Wielkopolski
- 2016–2017: Dafni Agiou Dimitriou
- 2017–2018: MBK Ružomberok
- 2018–2019: Dafni Agiou Dimitriou
- 2019–2020: T71 Dudelange
- 2020–2021: Södertälje BBK
- 2021–2022: BBC Grengewald Hueschtert
- 2022–2023: Mount Gambier Pioneers
- 2023–2024: Townsville Fire
- 2024: Mainland Pouākai
- 2025–2026: Chanson V-Magic
- 2026–: Xinjiang Magic Deer
Medals
Representing Canada
Women's basketball
FIBA Under-18 Americas Championship
Bronze medal – third place	2010 United States	Team
Women's 3x3 basketball
FIBA 3x3 World Cup
Bronze medal – third place	2025 Ulaanbaatar	Team
FIBA 3x3 AmeriCup
Gold medal – first place	2026 San Salvador

Cassandra Brown (born June 16, 1992) is a Canadian professional basketball player. Standing at 6 ft 2 in (1.88 m), she plays in the small forward position. She has also been a member of the Canada senior and 3x3 national team.

== Professional career ==
In the 2015–2016 season, Brown played for the Polish club Gorzów Wielkopolski.

For the 2016–17 season, Brown played for Dafni Agiou Dimitriou, where the team finished in fourth place in the Greek League. She was also the teams top scorer, with 359 points in 22 games and 16.32 points per game.

On June 13, 2023, Brown signed with the Townsville Fire for the 2023–24 WNBL season.

On August 15, 2024, Brown signed with the Mainland Pouākai of Tauihi Basketball Aotearoa.

On September 30, 2025, Brown signed with the Chanson V-Magic of the Women's Japan Basketball League and left the team upon the end of the season.

== National team career ==
Brown was part of the Canada U-19 team that won the bronze medal at the 2010 FIBA Under-18 Americas Championship.

Brown appeared for the Canada senior national team at the 2019 Pan American Games.

In 2025, Brown was part of the Canada national 3x3 squad that won the bronze medal in the 3x3 World Cup.

In 2026, Brown was part of the Canada national 3x3 squad that won the gold medal in the 3x3 AmeriCup.
