= Andorra men's national 3x3 team =

Andorra national sports team

Andorra
- Joined FIBA: 1988
- FIBA zone: FIBA Europe
- National federation: FAB

FIBA 3x3 World Championships
- Appearances: 2

FIBA Europe 3x3 Championships
- Appearances: 1

European Games
- Appearances: 1
Home	Away

The Andorra men's national 3x3 team is the 3x3 basketball team representing Andorra in international competitions, organized and run by the Andorran Basketball Federation.

== Senior Competitions ==
=== Performance at World Championships ===
Year	Pos	Pld	W	L
(Greece) 2012	Did not enter			
(Russia) 2014	Did not enter			
(China) 2016	13th	4	1	3
(France) 2017	13th	4	1	3
(Philippines) 2018	Did not qualify			
(Netherlands) 2019	Did not qualify			
(Belgium) 2022	Did not qualify			
(Austria) 2023	Did not qualify			
(Mongolia) 2025	Did not qualify			
(Poland) 2026	Did not qualify			
(Singapore) 2027	To be determined			

=== Performance at European Games ===
Year	Pos	Pld	W	L
(Azerbaijan) 2015	12th	4	1	3
(Belarus) 2019	16th	3	0	3
(Poland) 2023	Did not qualify			

=== Performance at Europe Championships ===
Year	Final tournament				Qualifier		
Year	Pos	Pld	W	L	Pld	W	L
(Romania) 2014	16th	3	0	3	4	1	3
(Romania) 2016	Did not qualify				4	1	3
(Netherlands) 2017	Did not qualify				4	1	3
(Romania) 2018	Did not qualify				3	0	3
(Hungary) 2019	Did not qualify				2	0	2
(France) 2021	Did not qualify				3	0	3
(Austria) 2022	Did not qualify				3	0	3
(Israel) 2023	Did not qualify				4	3	1
(Austria) 2024	Did not qualify				4	2	2
(Denmark) 2025	Did not qualify				Did not play		
(Belgium) 2026	Did not qualify				Did not play		

== Youth Competitions ==
=== Performance at the Youth Olympic Games ===
Year	Pos	Pld	W	L
(Singapore) 2010	Did not enter			
(China) 2014	17th	9	2	7
(Argentina) 2018	19th	4	0	4

=== Performance at Under-18 World Championships ===
Year	Pos	Pld	W	L
(Italy) 2011	Did not enter			
(Spain) 2012	Did not enter			
(Indonesia) 2013	31st	7	1	6
(Hungary) 2015	18th	5	1	4
(Kazakhstan) 2016	13th	4	1	3
(China) 2017	Did not enter			
(Mongolia) 2019	Did not enter			
(Hungary) 2021	Did not enter			
(Hungary) 2022	Did not enter			
(Hungary) 2023	Did not enter			
(Hungary) 2024	Did not enter			

=== Performance at Under-18 European Championships ===
Year	Final tournament				Qualifier		
Year	Pos	Pld	W	L	Pld	W	L
(Belarus) 2015	Did not enter				Did not enter		
(Hungary) 2016	4th	5	2	3	3	1	2

== See also ==
- Andorra women's national 3x3 team
