= 2025 FIBA 3x3 Europe Cup – Women's tournament =

Tournament details
- Host country: Denmark
- City: Copenhagen
- Dates: 5–7 September
- Teams: 12

Final positions
- Champions: Netherlands (2nd title)
- Runners-up: Azerbaijan
- Third place: Spain
- Fourth place: France

The 2025 FIBA 3x3 Europe Cup was the tenth edition of this continental championship. The event was held in Copenhagen, Denmark from 5 to 7 September 2025.

The Netherlands won their second title after a win over Azerbaijan.

== Qualification ==
12 teams participated.

	Date	Vacancies	Qualified
Host nation		1	Denmark
Defending champions	22–25 August 2024	1	Spain
3x3 World Rankings	1 January 2025	3	Netherlands; France; Germany
Slovakia Qualifier	7–8 June 2025	3	Great Britain; Lithuania; Austria
Romania Qualifier	7–8 June 2025	3	Hungary; Poland; Ukraine
Kosovo Qualifier	7–8 June 2025	1	Azerbaijan
Total		12	

== Preliminary round ==
The pools were announced on 17 July 2025.

All times are local (UTC+2).

=== Pool A ===
Pos	Team	Pld	W	L	PF	PA	PR	Qualification	NED	LTU	AUT
1	Netherlands	2	2	0	33	23	1.435	Quarterfinals		15–11	18–12
2	Lithuania	2	1	1	33	27	1.222	Quarterfinals			
3	Austria	2	0	2	24	40	0.600			12–22	

Source: FIBA
Rules for classification: 1) Wins; 2) Head-to-head record; 3) Points scored.

6 September 2025
12:00

Boxscore

Netherlands	15–11	Lithuania
Pts: Driessen 8		Pts: Petrėnaitė 5

Ofelia Plads, Copenhagen
Referees: Miroslava Jovicin, Borka Srdić

6 September 2025
15:00

Boxscore

Netherlands	18–12	Austria
Pts: Driessen 11		Pts: Höllerl 6

Ofelia Plads, Copenhagen
Referees: Pedro Maia, Miroslava Jovicin

6 September 2025
18:00

Boxscore

Austria	12–22	Lithuania
Pts: Allesch 6		Pts: Petrėnaitė 8

Ofelia Plads, Copenhagen
Referees: Miroslava Jovicin, Andrada Csender

=== Pool B ===
Pos	Team	Pld	W	L	PF	PA	PR	Qualification	AZE	FRA	UKR
1	Azerbaijan	2	2	0	42	30	1.400	Quarterfinals			
2	France	2	1	1	36	37	0.973	Quarterfinals	16–21		20–16
3	Ukraine	2	0	2	30	41	0.732		14–21		

Source: FIBA
Rules for classification: 1) Wins; 2) Head-to-head record; 3) Points scored.

5 September 2025
17:15

Boxscore

France	16–21	Azerbaijan
Pts: Mané 5		Pts: Fraser 11

Ofelia Plads, Copenhagen
Referees: Andrea Csender, Miroslava Jovicin

5 September 2025
18:15

Boxscore

France	20–16	Ukraine
Pts: Ewodo 11		Pts: Dubniuk 10

Ofelia Plads, Copenhagen
Referees: Borka Srdić, Andrea Csender

5 September 2025
20:05

Boxscore

Ukraine	14–21	Azerbaijan
Pts: Dubniuk 7		Pts: Mollenhauer 7

Ofelia Plads, Copenhagen
Referees: Andrada Csender, Borka Srdić

=== Pool C ===
Pos	Team	Pld	W	L	PF	PA	PR	Qualification	ESP	HUN	GBR
1	Spain	2	2	0	42	25	1.680	Quarterfinals		21–12	21–13
2	Hungary	2	1	1	29	37	0.784	Quarterfinals			17–15
3	Great Britain	2	0	2	28	38	0.737				

Source: FIBA
Rules for classification: 1) Wins; 2) Head-to-head record; 3) Points scored.

6 September 2025
13:00

Boxscore

Hungary	17–15	Great Britain
Pts: Laufer 10		Pts: Gayle 5

Ofelia Plads, Copenhagen
Referees: Andrea Csender, Pedro Maia

6 September 2025
16:00

Boxscore

Spain	21–13	Great Britain
Pts: Ygueravide 9		Pts: Gayle, Wallace 5

Ofelia Plads, Copenhagen
Referees: Borka Srdić, Andrea Csender

6 September 2025
19:00

Boxscore

Spain	21–12	Hungary
Pts: Gimeno 7		Pts: Szerencsés 7

Ofelia Plads, Copenhagen
Referees: Pedro Maia, Borka Srdić

=== Pool D ===
Pos	Team	Pld	W	L	PF	PA	PR	Qualification	GER	POL	DEN
1	Germany	2	2	0	33	23	1.435	Quarterfinals		19–12	14–11
2	Poland	2	1	1	33	38	0.868	Quarterfinals			21–19
3	Denmark (H)	2	0	2	30	35	0.857				

Source: FIBA
Rules for classification: 1) Wins; 2) Head-to-head record; 3) Points scored.
(H) Hosts

5 September 2025
16:25

Boxscore

Germany	19–12	Poland
Pts: Zolper 7		Pts: Telenga 6

Ofelia Plads, Copenhagen
Referees: Miroslava Jovicin, Pedro Maia

6 September 2025
18:40

Boxscore

Germany	14–11	Denmark
Pts: Degbeon, Zolper 5		Pts: Okosun 5

Ofelia Plads, Copenhagen
Referees: Pedro Maia, Borka Srdić

6 September 2025
20:55

Boxscore

Poland	21–19	Denmark
Pts: Pawłowska 8		Pts: Jespersen 7

Ofelia Plads, Copenhagen
Referees: Miroslava Jovicin, Pedro Maia

== Knockout stage ==
All times are local (UTC+2)

Quarter-finals
7 September – 10:00
Netherlands	21
Hungary	10
7 September – 10:25
Germany	11
France	17
7 September – 12:25
Azerbaijan	16
Poland	13
7 September – 12:50
Spain	20
Lithuania	14

Semi-finals
7 September – 15:00
Netherlands	21
France	10
7 September – 15:25
Azerbaijan	21
Spain	17

Final
7 September – 19:00
Netherlands	21
Azerbaijan	16
Third place
7 September – 18:00
France	15
Spain	21

=== Quarterfinals ===
7 September 2025
10:00

Boxscore

Netherlands	21–10	Hungary
Pts: Driessen 8		Pts: Szerencsés 7

Ofelia Plads, Copenhagen
Referees: Pedro Maia, Andrada Csender

7 September 2025
10:25

Boxscore

Germany	11–17	France
Pts: Polleros 5		Pts: Mané 6

Ofelia Plads, Copenhagen
Referees: Miroslava Jovicin, Borka Srdić

7 September 2025
12:25

Boxscore

Azerbaijan	16–13	Poland
Pts: Carter 7		Pts: Zięmborska 6

Ofelia Plads, Copenhagen
Referees: Andrada Csender, Pedro Maia

7 September 2025
12:50

Boxscore

Spain	21–14	Lithuania
Pts: Ygueravide 7		Pts: Miknaitė, Šulskė 6

Ofelia Plads, Copenhagen
Referees: Borka Srdić, Miroslava Jovicin

=== Semifinals ===
7 September 2025
15:00

Boxscore

Netherlands	21–10	France
Pts: Driessen 11		Pts: Paget 5

Ofelia Plads, Copenhagen
Referees: Miroslava Jovicin, Pedro Maia

7 September 2025
15:25

Boxscore

Azerbaijan	21–17	Spain
Pts: Fraser 10		Pts: Ygueravide 7

Ofelia Plads, Copenhagen
Referees: Andrada Csender, Borka Srdić

=== Bronze medal game ===
7 September 2025
18:00

Boxscore

France	15–21	Spain
Pts: Mané 7		Pts: Ygueravide 8

Ofelia Plads, Copenhagen
Referees: Pedro Maia, Borka Srdić

=== Final ===
7 September 2025
19:00

Boxscore

Netherlands	21–16	Azerbaijan
Pts: Driessen 11		Pts: Fraser 8

Ofelia Plads, Copenhagen
Referees: Miroslava Jovicin, Andrada Csender

== Final ranking ==
Rank	Team	Record
1st place, gold medalist(s)	Netherlands	5–0
2nd place, silver medalist(s)	Azerbaijan	4–1
3rd place, bronze medalist(s)	Spain	4–1
4	France	2–3
5	Germany	2–1
6	Poland	1–2
7	Lithuania	1–2
8	Hungary	1–2
9	Ukraine	0–2
10	Denmark	0–2
11	Great Britain	0–2
12	Austria	0–2
