= Basketball Belgium =

Sports governing body in Belgium

- Founded: 1933; 93 years ago
- Affiliation: FIBA Europe
- Headquarters: Brussels
- President: Jan Van Lantschoot

Official website
- basketballbelgium.be

Basketball Belgium (French: Basketball Belgique, Dutch: Basketbal België, German: Basketball Belgien) is the governing body of basketball in Belgium. It was founded in 1933, and they became members of FIBA the same year. They are headquartered in Brussels.

Basketball Belgium operates the Belgium men's national team and Belgium women's national team. They organise national competitions in Belgium, for both the men's and women's senior teams, and also the youth national basketball teams.

The top professional league in Belgium is the BNXT League.

== See also ==
- Belgium men's national basketball team
- Belgium men's national under-20 basketball team
- Belgium men's national under-18 basketball team
- Belgium men's national under-16 basketball team
- Belgium men's national 3x3 team
- Belgium women's national basketball team
- Belgium women's national under-20 basketball team
- Belgium women's national under-19 basketball team
- Belgium women's national under-17 basketball team
- Belgium women's national 3x3 team
