= Latvia women's national 3x3 team =

National 3x3 basketball team

Latvia
- FIBA zone: FIBA Europe

World Cup
- Appearances: 3

Europe Cup
- Appearances: 3
- Medals: (bronze) Bronze: (2019)

The Latvia women's national 3x3 team is a national 3x3 basketball team of Latvia, governed by the Latvian Basketball Association. It represents the country in international 3x3 women's basketball competitions.

== Competitions ==
=== Summer Olympics ===
Year	Position	Pld	W	L	Players
(Japan) 2020 Tokyo	Did not qualify				
(France) 2024 Paris	Did not qualify				
Total	0/2				

=== World Cup ===
Year	Position	Pld	W	L
(Greece) 2012 Athens	Did not qualify			
(Russia) 2014 Moscow	Did not qualify			
(China) 2016 Guangzhou	Did not qualify			
(France) 2017 Nantes	Did not qualify			
(Philippines) 2018 Bocaue	Did not qualify			
(Netherlands) 2019 Amsterdam	15th	4	1	3
(Belgium) 2022 Antwerp	Did not qualify			
(Austria) 2023 Vienna	Did not qualify			
(Mongolia) 2025 Ulaanbaatar	17th	4	1	3
(Poland) 2026 Warsaw	9th	5	3	2
2027 Singapore	To be determined			
Total	3/11	13	5	8

=== European Championships ===
Year	Position	Pld	W	L
(Romania) 2014 Bucharest	16th	3	0	3
(Romania) 2016 Bucharest	Did not qualify			
(Netherlands) 2017 Amsterdam	Did not qualify			
(Romania) 2018 Bucharest	Did not qualify			
(Hungary) 2019 Debrecen	3rd	5	3	2
(France) 2021 Paris	Did not qualify			
(Austria) 2022 Graz	Did not qualify			
(Israel) 2023 Jerusalem	Did not qualify			
(Austria) 2024 Vienna	7th	3	1	2
(Denmark) 2025 Copenhagen	To be determined			
Total	3/9	11	4	7

== See also ==
- Latvia men's national 3x3 team
- Latvia women's national basketball team
