= Andorran Basketball Federation =

Sports governing body in Andorra

- Sport: Basketball
- Jurisdiction: Andorra
- Abbreviation: FAB
- Founded: 1988
- Affiliation: FIBA
- Regional affiliation: FIBA Europe
- Affiliation date: 2001
- Headquarters: Andorra la Vella
- President: Manuel Fernández

Official website
- www.fab.ad
- (Andorra)

The Andorran Basketball Federation (Catalan: Federació Andorrana de Basquetbol) is the governing body of basketball in Andorra. It was founded in 1988. It organizes the internal league and runs the Andorra national basketball team and also the men's and women's national 3x3 teams.

The current president of the federation is Manuel Fernández.

== Achievements ==
- EuroBasket Division C - 1998, 2000, 2004, 2012, 2014

== See also ==
- Andorra national basketball team
