= Denmark men's national 3x3 team =

National 3x3 basketball team

Denmark
- Joined FIBA: 1951
- FIBA zone: FIBA Europe
- National federation: DBBF

FIBA 3x3 World Cup
- Appearances: 1 (2014)
- Medals: None

FIBA 3x3 Europe Cup
- Appearances: 1
- Medals: None
Home	Away

The Denmark men's national 3x3 team represents Denmark in international 3x3 basketball matches and is governed by the Danish Basketball Association (Danish: Danmarks Basketball-Forbund).

== See also ==
- Denmark national basketball team
