= Carlo Fumagalli =

Italian basketball player

Pallacanestro Mantovana
- Position: Point-guard
- League: Serie A2

Personal information
- Born: April 25, 1996 (age 30) Milan, Italy
- Listed height: 186 cm (6 ft 1 in)
- Listed weight: 80 kg (176 lb)

Career information
- Playing career: 2013–present

Career history
- 2013–15: Olimpia Milano (Italy)
- 2015–: Pallacanestro Mantovana (Italy)

Career highlights
- Italian League champion (2014)

Carlo Fumagalli (born April 25, 1996) is an Italian basketball player.

== Career ==
=== Youth career ===
He start playing basketball with the Olimpia Milano's youth teams with whom he won the Italian league under-15 in 2011 and the Italian league under-17 in 2013.

=== Pro career ===
In seasons 2013–14 and 2014–15 he is part of the Olimpia Milano's roster, with whom he won the championship in 2014. During the second season with Milano he is called up for the Euroleague matches against Anadolu Efes, Barcelona, Fenerbahçe and Maccabi Tel Aviv. He scores his first Serie A points against Virtus Bologna. Since the summer of 2015 he is part of the Pallacanestro Mantovana's roster of the Serie A2.

== Awards and accomplishments ==
=== Youth career ===
- Italian league Under-15 champion (2011)
- Italian league Under-17 champion (2013)

=== Pro career ===
- Italian league champion (2014)

== Career statistics ==
=== Lega Basket Serie A ===
Year	Team	GP	GS	MPG	FG%	3P%	FT%	RPG	APG	SPG	BPG	PPG
2013–14	Milano	2	0	1	.0	.0	.0	.0	.0	.5	.0	.0
2014–15	Milano	3	0	1.6	.0	.0	100	.0	.6	.0	.0	0.6
Career		5	0	1.4	.0	.0	100	.0	.4	.2	.0	0.4
