= Hiroe Kakizaki =

Japanese basketball player

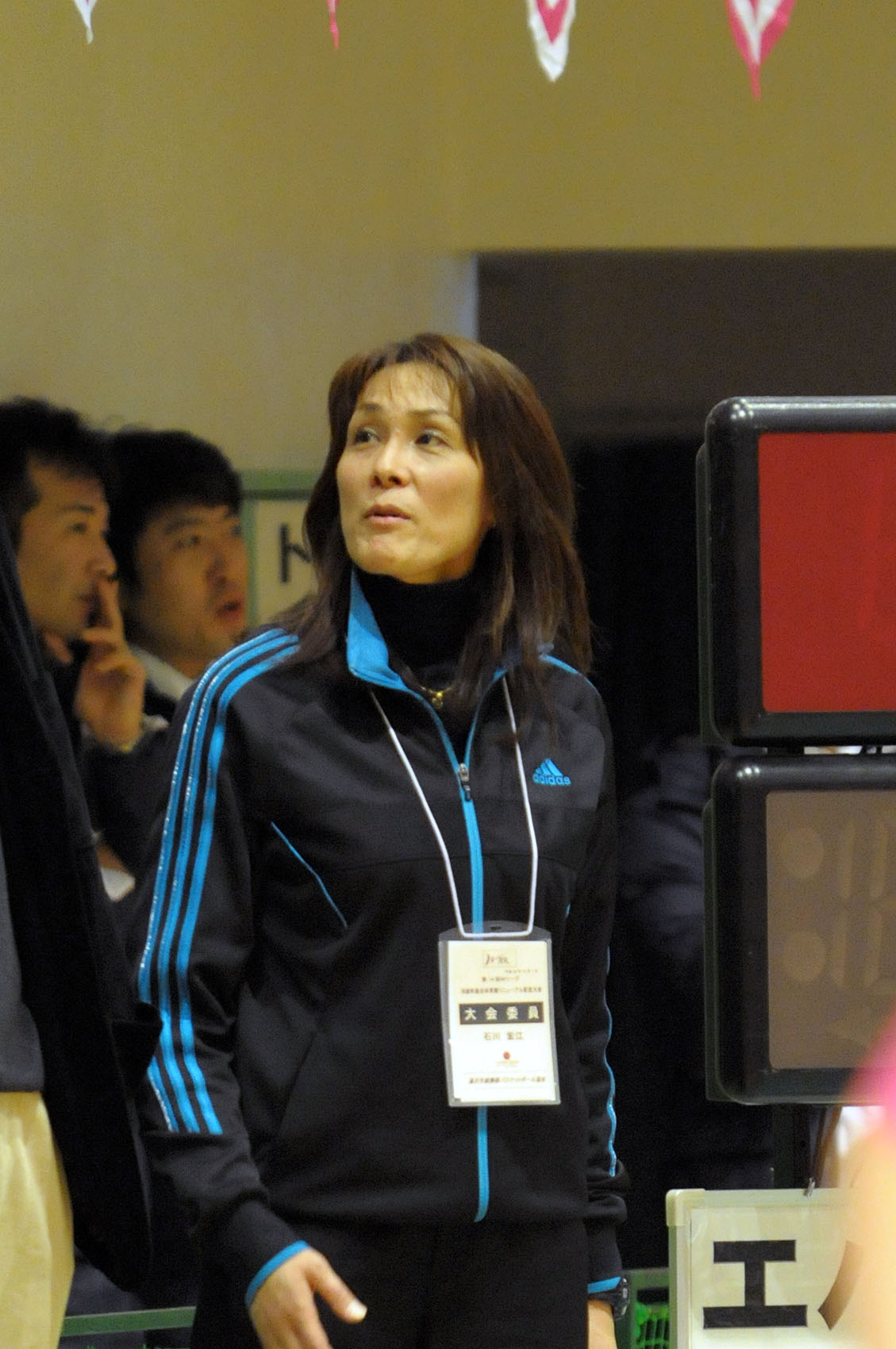
- Kakizaki at Ugo General Gymnasium in 2012

Personal information
- Born: April 12, 1969 (age 57) Yuzawa, Akita
- Listed height: 5 ft 11 in (1.80 m)

Career information
- High school: Yuzawa Kita (Yuzawa, Akita)

Career history
- 1986-xxxx: Chanson V-Magic

Career highlights
- All Japan Best Five (1994); WJBL MVP (1994)
Medals
Women's basketball
Representing Japan
Asian Games
Silver medal – second place	1994 Hiroshima	Japan

Hiroe Kakizaki Ishikawa (柿崎 宏江, Kakizaki Hiroe; born April 12, 1969) is a Japanese former basketball player who played for Chanson V-Magic of the Women's Japan Basketball League. She won a silver medal with the Japan women's national basketball team at the 1994 Asian Games.
