= 2024 FIBA 3x3 Europe Cup – Women's tournament =

Tournament details
- Host country: Austria
- City: Vienna
- Dates: 22–25 August
- Teams: 12
- Venue: Kaiserwiese

Final positions
- Champions: Spain (2nd title)
- Runners-up: France
- Third place: Netherlands
- Fourth place: Poland

The 2024 FIBA 3x3 Europe Cup – Women's tournament was the ninth edition of this continental championship. The event was held in the Austrian capital, Vienna.

Netherlands are the defending champions.

== Host selection ==
Vienna, Austria, was given the hosting rights on 21 February 2024. This marks the second time of Austria hosting the event after Graz hosted the competition in 2022.

== Venue ==
The venue that this was held at was the Kaiserwiese in Vienna.

== Qualification ==
	Date	Vacancies	Qualified
Host nation	21 February 2024	1	Austria
Defending champions		1	Netherlands
3x3 World Rankings		3	France; Germany; Hungary
(Denmark) Copenhagen Qualifier	7–8 June	2	Spain; Italy
(Kosovo) Pristina Qualifier	8–9 June	1	Azerbaijan
(Slovakia) Bratislava Qualifier	15–16 June	2	Ukraine; Poland
(Romania) Bucharest Qualifier	15–16 June	2	Romania; Latvia
Total		12	

== Seeding ==
The seeding is as follows:

Pool A	Pool B	Pool C	Pool D
France (1); Italy (8); Ukraine (9)	Germany (2); Poland (7); Romania (10)	Spain (3); Azerbaijan (6); Austria (11)	Hungary (4); Netherlands (5); Latvia (12)

== Tournament ==
The schedule was confirmed on July 26 2024.

=== Preliminary round ===
Pool A

Pos	Team	Pld	W	L	PF	PA	PD	Pts	Qualification	(France)	(Ukraine)	(Italy)
1	France	2	2	0	31	21	+10	4	Quarterfinals		17–11	14–10
2	Ukraine	2	1	1	26	28	−2	3	Quarterfinals			
3	Italy	2	0	2	21	29	−8	2			11–15	

Source: FIBA
Rules for classification: 1) Wins; 2) Head-to-head record; 3) Points scored; 4) Higher seed.

22 August 2024
13:15

Boxscore

France	14–10	Italy
Pts: Paget, Milapie 5		Pts: 5 Consolini

Kaiserwiese, Vienna
Referees: Borka Srdić, Vladimir Veskovic

22 August 2024
16:50

Boxscore

Italy	11–15	Ukraine
Pts: Trimboli 4		Pts: Filevych 8

Kaiserwiese, Vienna
Referees: Brigitta Csabai-Kasköto, Alex Talisainen

22 August 2024
20:55

Boxscore

France	17–11	Ukraine
Pts: Brochant 7		Pts: 4 Liashko 4

Kaiserwiese, Vienna
Referees: Pedro Maia, Brigitta Csabai-Kasköto

Pool B

Pos	Team	Pld	W	L	PF	PA	PD	Pts	Qualification	(Poland)	(Germany)	(Romania)
1	Poland	2	2	0	38	23	+15	4	Quarterfinals			17–9
2	Germany	2	1	1	35	28	+7	3	Quarterfinals	14–21		21–7
3	Romania	2	0	2	16	38	−22	2				

Source: FIBA
Rules for classification: 1) Wins; 2) Head-to-head record; 3) Points scored; 4) Higher seed.

23 August 2024
12:50

Boxscore

Germany	21–7	Romania
Pts: Mevius 7		Pts: Ferariu 4

Kaiserwiese, Vienna
Referees: Borka Srdić, Vladimir Veskovic

23 August 2024
16:15

Boxscore

Poland	17–9	Romania
Pts: Ziemborska 6		Pts: Mititelu 5

Kaiserwiese, Vienna
Referees: Alex Talisainen, Vladimir Veskovic

23 August 2024
21:55

Boxscore

Germany	14–21	Poland
Pts: Mevius 5		Pts: Ziemborska 8

Kaiserwiese, Vienna
Referees: Brigitta Csabai-Kasköto, Pedro Maia

Pool C

Pos	Team	Pld	W	L	PF	PA	PD	Pts	Qualification	(Spain)	(Austria)	(Azerbaijan)
1	Spain	2	2	0	40	26	+14	4	Quarterfinals		20–14	20–12
2	Austria (H)	2	1	1	35	27	+8	3	Quarterfinals			
3	Azerbaijan	2	0	2	19	41	−22	2			7–21	

Source: FIBA
Rules for classification: 1) Wins; 2) Head-to-head record; 3) Points scored; 4) Higher seed.
(H) Hosts

22 August 2024
13:40

Boxscore

Spain	20–12	Azerbaijan
Pts: Ygueravide 9		Pts: 10 Ulyanova

Kaiserwiese, Vienna
Referees: Vladimir Veskovic, Najib Chajiddine

22 August 2024
17:15

Boxscore

Azerbaijan	7–21	Austria
Pts: Mollenhauer 4		Pts: Allesch 9

Kaiserwiese, Vienna
Referees: Pedro Maia, Alex Talisainen

22 August 2024
21:20

Boxscore

Spain	20–14	Austria
Pts: Ygueravide 11		Pts: 5 Fuchs-Robetin

Kaiserwiese, Vienna
Referees: Alex Talisainen, Brigitta Csabai-Kasköto

Pool D

Pos	Team	Pld	W	L	PF	PA	PD	Pts	Qualification	(Netherlands)	(Latvia)	(Hungary)
1	Netherlands	2	2	0	35	25	+10	4	Quarterfinals		19–13	
2	Latvia	2	1	1	29	33	−4	3	Quarterfinals			
3	Hungary	2	0	2	26	32	−6	2		12–16	14–16	

Source: FIBA
Rules for classification: 1) Wins; 2) Head-to-head record; 3) Points scored; 4) Higher seed.

23 August 2024
12:25

Boxscore

Hungary	14–16	Latvia
Pts: Tóth 7		Pts: Leimane 7

Kaiserwiese, Vienna
Referees: Alex Talisainen, Borka Srdić

23 August 2024
15:50

Boxscore

Netherlands	19–13	Latvia
Pts: Boonstra 8		Pts: Mišcenko 5

Kaiserwiese, Vienna
Referees: Vladimir Veskovic, Borka Srdić

23 August 2024
20:55

Boxscore

Hungary	12–16	Netherlands
Pts: Wentzel 5		Pts: Driessen 6

Kaiserwiese, Vienna
Referees: Najib Chajiddine, Pedro Maia

=== Knockout stage ===
All times are local.

Quarter-finals
August 24 – 20:15
France	21
Austria	14
August 24 – 19:50
Netherlands	20
Germany	15
August 24 – 13:45
Poland	19
Latvia	17
August 24 – 14:10
Spain	18
Ukraine	15

Semi-finals
August 25 – 12:00
France	18
Netherlands	17
August 25 – 12:25
Poland	11
Spain	21

Final
August 25 – 19:05
France	11
Spain	19
Bronze medal
August 25 – 17:50
Netherlands	21
Poland	14

==== Quarterfinals ====
24 August 2024
13:45

Boxscore

Poland	19–17	Latvia
Pts: Telenga 7		Pts: Maurina 7

Kaiserwiese, Vienna
Referees: Pedro Maia, Najib Chajiddine

24 August 2024
14:10

Boxscore

Spain	18–15	Ukraine
Pts: Ygueravide, Alonso		Pts: Uro-Nilie 6

Kaiserwiese, Vienna
Referees: Borka Srdić, Pedro Maia

24 August 2024
19:50

Boxscore

Netherlands	20–15	Germany
Pts: Boonstra 8		Pts: Mevius 8

Kaiserwiese, Vienna
Referees: Borka Srdić, Vladimir Veskovic

24 August 2024
20:15

Boxscore

France	21–14	Austria
Pts: Droguet 7		Pts: Kalaydjiev 6

Kaiserwiese, Vienna
Referees: Brigitta Csabai-Kasköto, Borka Srdić

==== Semifinals ====
25 August 2024
12:00

Boxscore

France	18–17	Netherlands
Pts: Paget 9		Pts: 9 Boonstra

Kaiserwiese, Vienna
Referees: Borka Srdić, Brigitta Csabai-Kasköto

25 August 2024
12:25

Boxscore

Poland	11–21	Spain
Pts: three players 3		Pts: Ygueravide 10

Kaiserwiese, Vienna
Referees: Pedro Maia, Borka Srdić

==== Bronze medal game ====
25 August 2024
12:00

Boxscore

Netherlands	21–14	Poland
Pts: Driessen 11		Pts: Telenga 10

Kaiserwiese, Vienna
Referees: Borka Srdić, Alex Talisainen

==== Final ====
25 August 2024
12:00

Boxscore

France	11–19	Spain
Pts: Milapie 5		Pts: Ygueravide 6

Kaiserwiese, Vienna
Referees: Vladimir Veskovic, Pedro Maia

== Final standings ==
Pos	Team	Pld	W	L
1st place, gold medalist(s)	Spain	5	5	0
2nd place, silver medalist(s)	France	5	4	1
3rd place, bronze medalist(s)	Netherlands	5	4	1
4	Poland	5	3	2
5	Germany	3	1	2
6	Austria	3	1	2
7	Latvia	3	1	2
8	Ukraine	3	1	2
9	Hungary	2	0	2
10	Italy	2	0	2
11	Azerbaijan	2	0	2
12	Romania	2	0	2

Source: Standings

== See also ==
- 2024 FIBA 3x3 Europe Cup – Men's tournament
- 2024 FIBA 3x3 AmeriCup – Men's tournament
- 2024 FIBA 3x3 AmeriCup – Women's tournament
- 2024 FIBA 3x3 Asia Cup – Men's tournament
- 2024 FIBA 3x3 Asia Cup – Women's tournament
- 2024 FIBA 3x3 Africa Cup – Men's tournament
- 2024 FIBA 3x3 Africa Cup – Women's tournament
