= Groenplaats =

Square in Antwerp, Belgium

- City square
- {{{other_names}}}
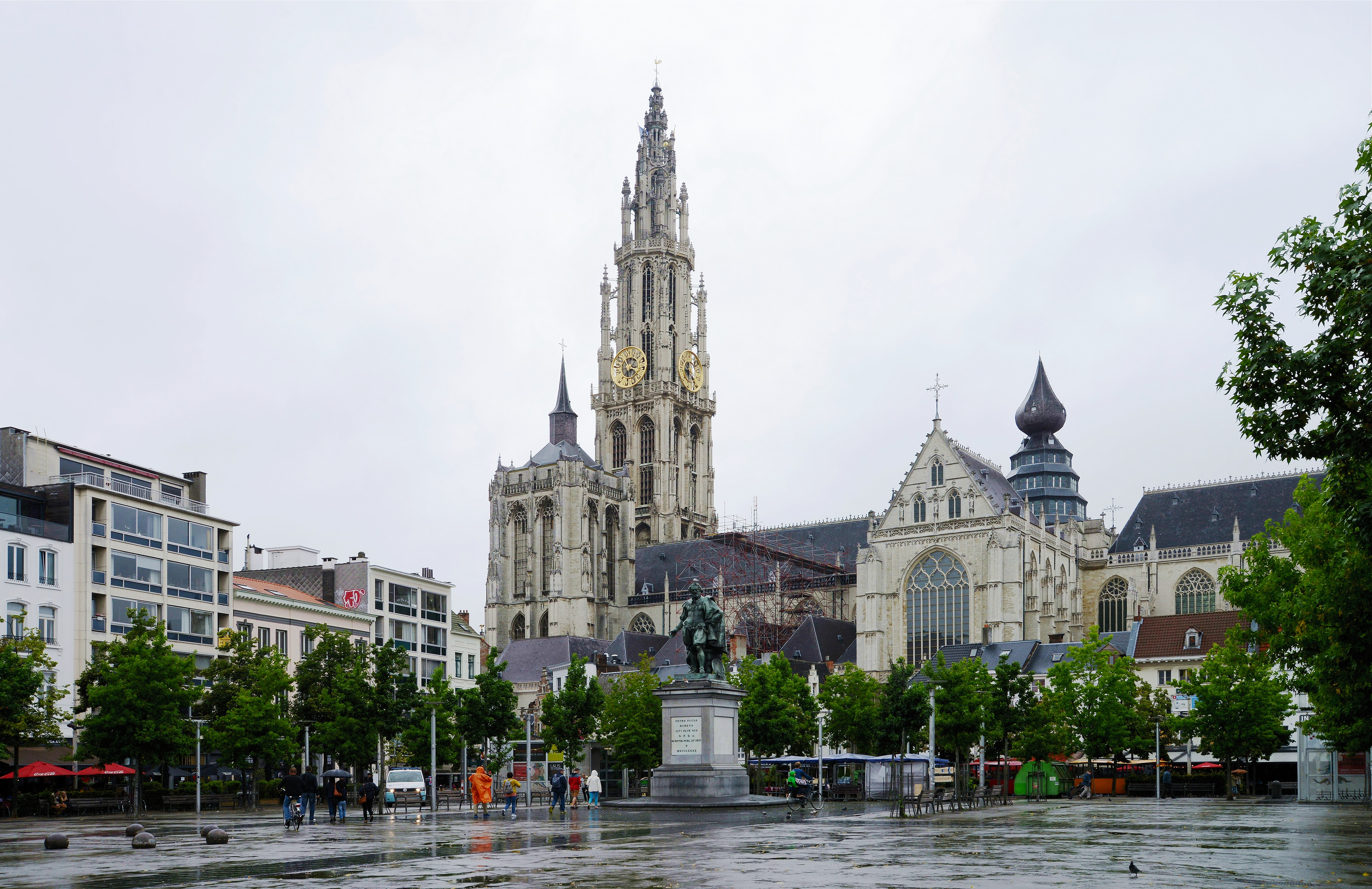
- Opened: 1805
- Area: 1.051 ha (2.60 acres)
- Location: Antwerp, Belgium
- Interactive map of Groenplaats
- Coordinates: 51°13′9″N 4°24′6″E

The Groenplaats (Green Square) is a large square in the center of the Belgian city of Antwerp, situated south of the Antwerp cathedral. There are various trees with benches on the square, which is a 'resting place'. A statue of Rubens, designed in 1840 and erected in 1843 by Willem Geefs, is in the center of the square. Adjacent lie many cafes as well as a Hilton hotel, located in the old Grand Bazar building. An underground parking garage and the Groenplaats metro station are situated underneath the square.

== History ==
At least since the 13th century, the south side of the Cathedral of Our Lady served as an Antwerp cemetery, for the poorer residents who could not afford to be buried in the church itself. The cemetery was a part of the allodial land owned by the Cathedral chapter without any feudal obligations. In 1784, Emperor Joseph II forbade the burial of deceased within the city walls

In 1795, the grounds of the cathedral, were claimed by the French. A few years later, in 1799, the walls around it were demolished. Construction of the Place de l’égalité (Equality Square) began in 1803. The houses located in the area were demolished and three rows of lime trees were planted. In 1805 it was solemnly inaugurated as Place Bonaparte (Bonaparte Square) in honor of Napoleon, and retained that name until 1815.

It was the intention of the French revolutionaries to place a memorial in the center of the square in honor of Freedom. In 1797, during the disputes between the church and the municipal administration about the expropriation of the cemetery, the municipal officer François Roché was murdered in the cathedral.

Between 1819 and 1877 the Court of First Instance resided in the south of the Cathedral grounds, a site currently situated by the Post Office.

In 1885, in the building in which the current Hilton hotel is located, Frenchman Adolphe Kileman started a department store, named the Grand Bazar du Bon Marché.

== Public transport ==
Underneath the square lies the Groenplaats premetro station, which was opened in 1975. It is also serviced by above ground tram routes and functions as a bus terminal for a number of southbound lines. A turning loop for trams runs around the square.

== Sports ==
The Groenplaats has hosted the official 2022 FIBA 3x3 World Cup.
