= Elisa Mevius =

German basketball player

No. 8 – Green Bay Phoenix
- Position: Guard
- League: Horizon League

Personal information
- Born: 23 April 2004 (age 22) Rendsburg, Germany
- Listed height: 1.80 m (5 ft 11 in)

Career information
- College: Siena (2022–2024); Oregon (2024-2026); Green Bay (2026-present)

Career highlights
- MAAC Defensive Player of the Year (2024); First-team All-MAAC (2024); MAAC Freshman of the Year (2023); MAAC All-Freshman Team (2023)
Medals
Women's 3x3 basketball
Representing Germany
Olympic Games
Gold medal – first place	2024 Paris	Team
World University Games
Gold medal – first place	2025 Rhine-Ruhr	Team

Elisa Mevius (born 23 April 2004) is a German college basketball player for the Green Bay Phoenix of the Horizon League. She previously played for the Siena Saints and the Oregon Ducks. She represented Germany at the 2024 Summer Olympics in the 3x3 event and won Germany’s first ever gold medal in the event.

== Early life ==
Mevius was born in Rendsburg, Germany to Antje and Leo Mevius. She started playing basketball at an early age in a local club founded by her parents. In 2019, she moved to the part-time basketball boarding school in Grünberg in central Hesse and from then on played for the Bender Baskets Grünberg in the 2nd Bundesliga and a central Hesse team in the Women's Junior Basketball Bundesliga.

== College career ==
=== Siena ===
Mevius played for the Siena Saints from 2022 to 2024. In March 2024, Mevius entered the transfer portal.

=== Oregon ===
On 27 March 2024, Mevius committed to the Oregon Ducks. Mevius's junior season ended prematurely due to a hand injury sustained in February 2025. During her junior season, she played in 28 games, starting in 19 of them, and averaged 6.6 points, 3.0 assists, 2.9 rebounds, and 1.6 steals per game.

=== Green Bay ===
On April 21, 2026, Elisa Mevius announced her commitment to Green Bay on her Instagram profile.

== Career statistics ==
Legend
GP	Games played	GS	Games started	MPG	Minutes per game	RPG	Rebounds per game
APG	Assists per game	SPG	Steals per game	BPG	Blocks per game	PPG	Points per game
TO	Turnovers per game	FG%	Field-goal percentage	3P%	3-point field-goal percentage	FT%	Free-throw percentage
**Bold**	Career best	°	League leader

=== College ===
Year	Team	GP	GS	MPG	FG%	3P%	FT%	RPG	APG	SPG	BPG	TO	PPG
2022–23	Siena	**32**	**31**	29.6	37.8	**30.9**	**80.4**	4.0	4.1	2.2	**0.4**	4.2	10.3
2023–24	Siena	30	30	**36.0**	**45.5**	27.6	74.2	**6.8**	**5.1**°	**4.5**°	0.3	3.8	**12.0**
2024–25	Oregon	28	19	22.1	44.2	30.3	77.8	2.9	3.0	1.6	0.0	**1.6**	6.6
**Career**		90	80	29.4	42.3	29.5	77.9	4.6	4.1	2.8	0.2	3.2	9.7
Statistics retrieved from Sports-Reference.
