= Ofelia Plads =

Public space in Copenhagen, Denmark

Coordinates: 55.6814°N 12.5956°E

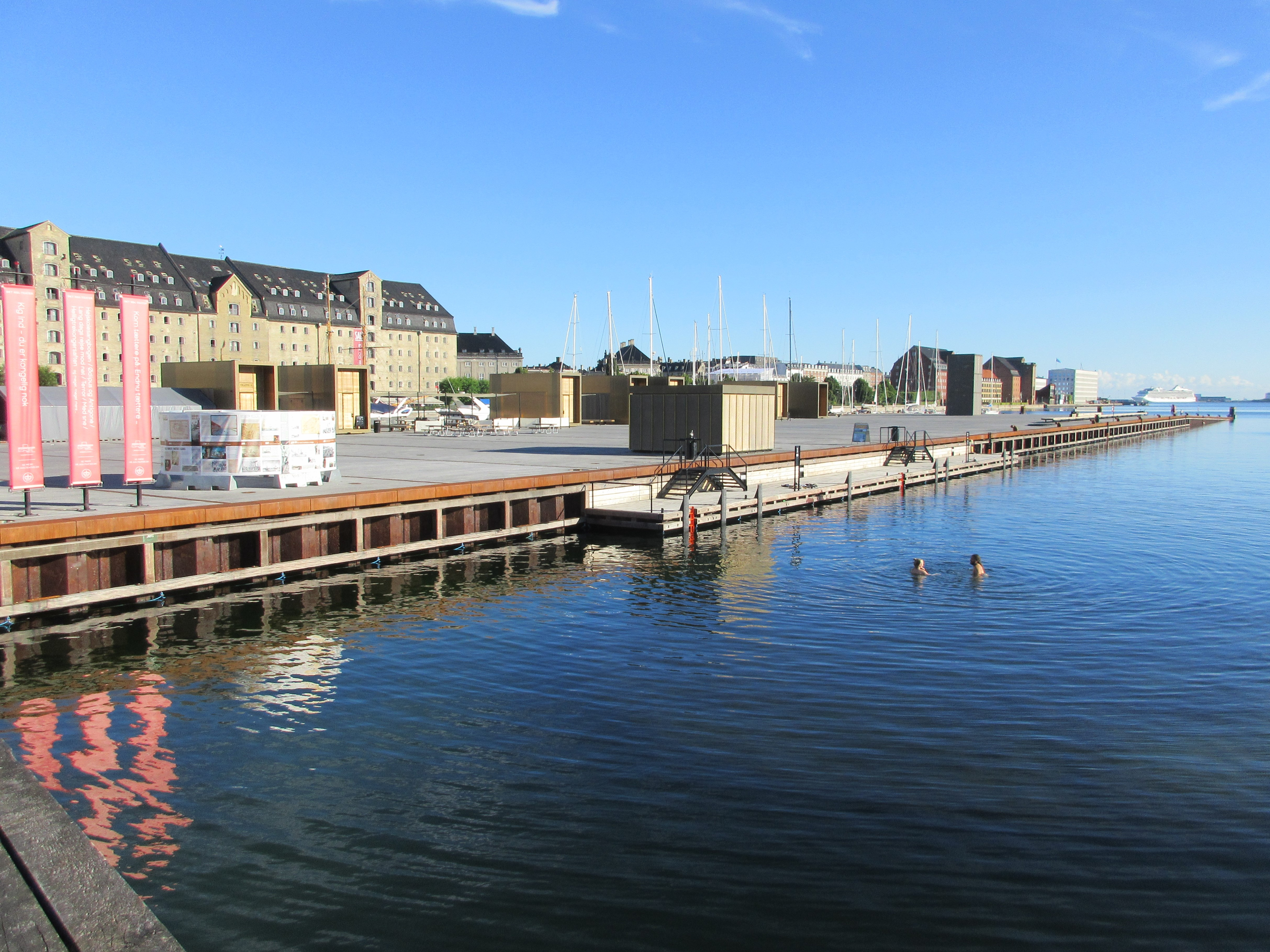
Ofelia Plads

Ofelia Plads is a public space situated on the Kvæsthus Pier next to the Royal Danish Playhouse on the harbourfront in Copenhagen, Denmark. It is owned by the Ministry of Culture and Jeudan and is used as an open-air venue by the Royal Danish Theatre. It was completed in 2016 to design by Lundgaard & Tranberg and is located on top of an underground parking facility with room for 500 cars.

== History ==
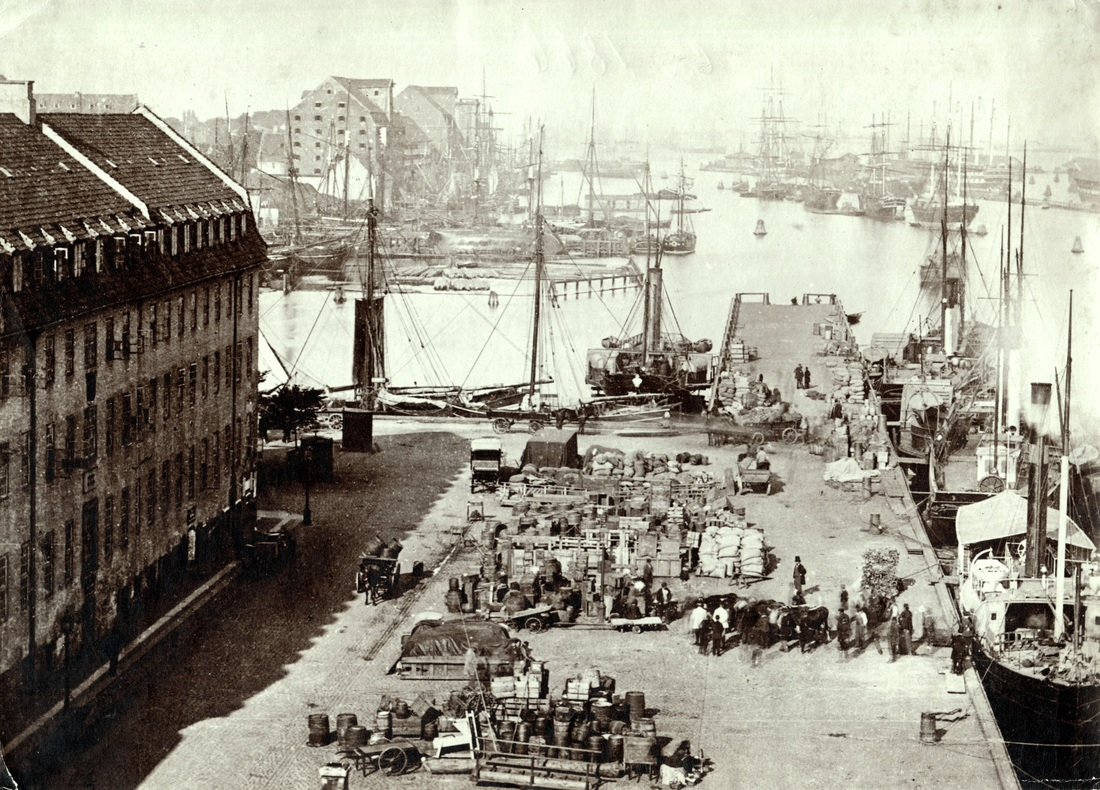
The Kvæsthus Pier on 15 September 1865 photographed by Vilhelm Tillge

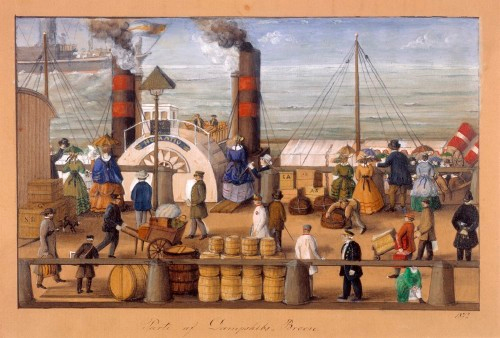
Horation berthed at the Kvæsthus Pier in 1872

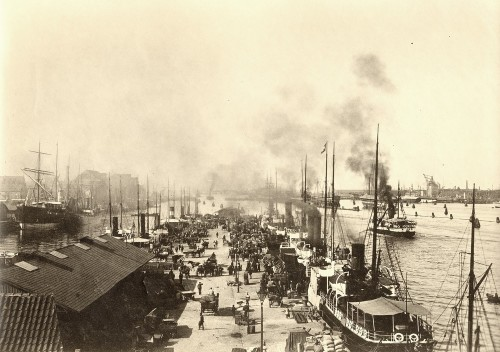
The Kvæsthus Pier in 1895

The pier was named after Kvæsthuset, a naval hospital located at the site from 1686. It later moved to Christianshavn and the building was then used first as poorhouse and later storage space. The pier was built as a hub for the new steam ferries that had begun to operate between Copenhagen and most of the larger seaports in the provinces.

Det Forenede Dampskibs-Selskab was established in 1866 and was based in the former naval hospital from 1872. Most of its ferries to many Danish seaports departed from the pier. The company had daily departures to Aarhus and Aalborg and departures one to three times a week to smaller towns such as Frederikshavn, Fredericia, Kolding, Horsens, Vejle, Randers, Aabenraa, Faaborg, Middelfart, Svendborg and Sønderborg. The pier was extended to its current length in 1877–1878.

Most of the domestic ferry routes gradually disappeared after World War II. They were replaced by the Oslo Ferries in 1974 and a few years later the Bornholm Ferries followed. The Oslo Ferries moved to the northern tip of Amerikakaj in the 2000s while the Bornholm Ferries moved to Køge.

The site changed dramatically when the Royal Danish Playhouse opened in 2008. In 2010, the Copenhagen City Council approved Realdania's Kvæsthus Project and the pier was temporarily converted into a beach setting under the name Ofelia Beach. Ofelia Plads and the underground car park were inaugurated on 29 June 2016.

== Public space ==
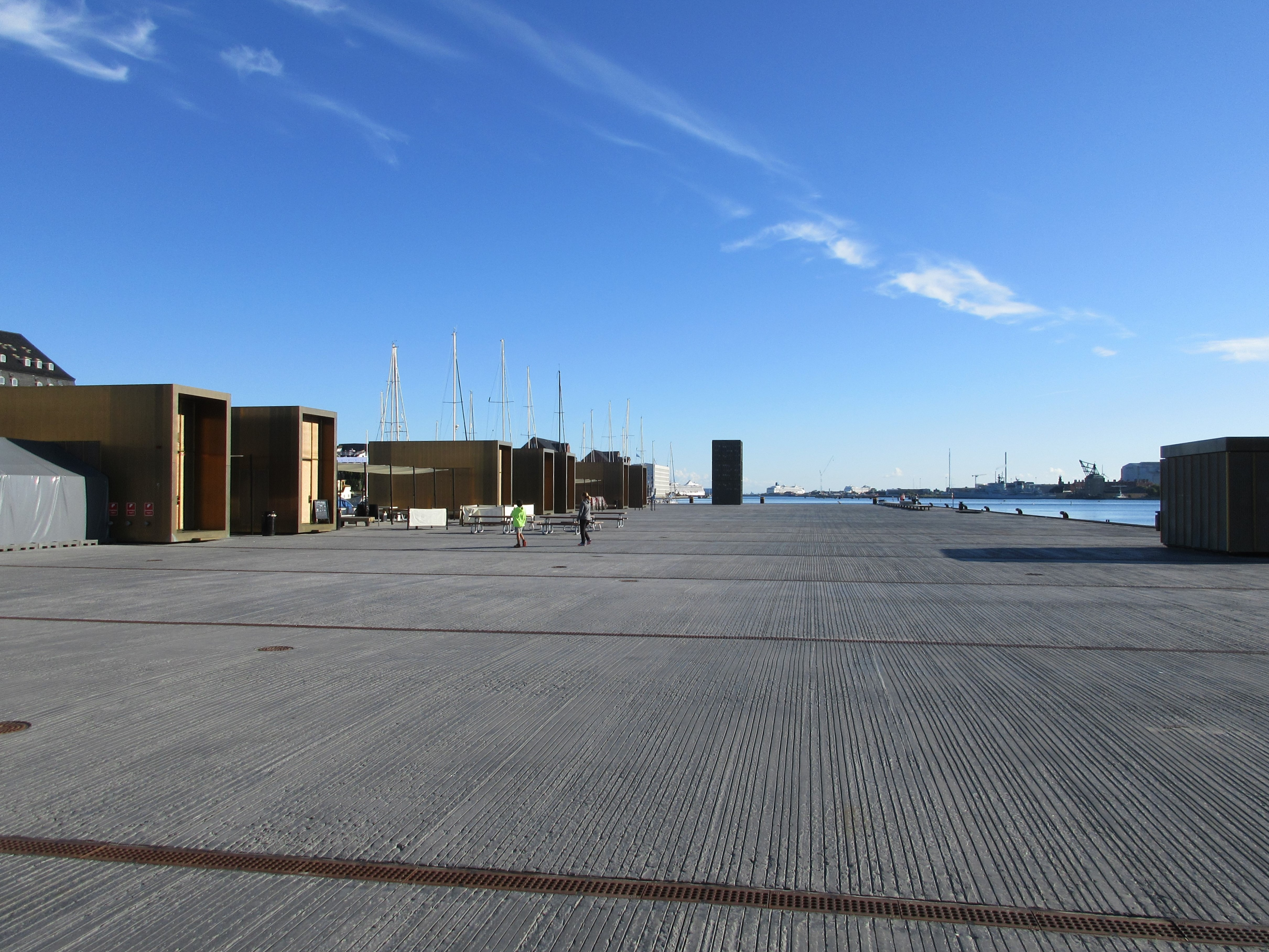
Ofelia Plads

The public space runs in the full length of the pier. Large squares coated with dark grooved concrete, step down in the north and disappear under the water level. It is approximately 450 metres long and has an area of 1,100 square metres.

The square is equipped with pavilions containing the entrance to the car park, a café, toilets, ticket sales for the harbour tours and a fly tower for outdoor plays, concerts and other kinds of performance. Furthermore, the square is arranged with the possibility for installing big screens, temporary covers, and is equipped with gear for various street- and beach sports.

Stairs and jetties in multiple locations along the edges of the pier makes it possible to access the water.

== Car park ==
The underground car park takes up three floors, covers 17,800 square metres and has room for 500 cars. It has high ceilings and allows daylight to reach into all three levels via a grand atrium. The car park is operated by Jeudan. They donate an amount of money per car that uses the facility to cultural activities.

== Cultural events ==
Ofelia Plads is host to a wide array of cultural activities, including opera, ballet, concerts and story time for children. The events are curated and organized by the Royal Danish Theatre.

== Other activities ==
The dock between the pier and the main harborfront will be converted into an ice skating rink in the winter time. A Harbour Bath will open at the tip of the pier in 2017.
