= Aleksandra Zięmborska =

Polish basketball player

No. 0 – Polski Cukier AZS-UMCS Lublin
- Position: Small / power forward
- League: Basket Liga Kobiet

Personal information
- Born: March 2, 2000 (age 26)
- Listed height: 182 cm (6 ft 0 in)

Career information
- Playing career: 2015–present

Career history
- 2015–2017: Enea AZS Poznań (1LK)
- 2017–2018: Enea AZS Poznań (EBLK)
- 2017–2018: Lider Swarzędz (1LK)
- 2017–2018: Enea AZS Poznań (2LK)
- 2018–2019: Enea AZS II Poznań (1LK)
- 2019–2021: MUKS Poznań (1LK)
- 2021–2022: BC Polkowice
- 2022–present: AZS-UMCS Lublin

Aleksandra Zięmborska (born 2 March 2000) is a Polish professional basketball player who plays as a small or power forward for Polski Cukier AZS-UMCS Lublin in the Basket Liga Kobiet and the Polish national 3x3 basketball team.

== Career ==
Zięmborska began her professional basketball career in 2015. She has played for several Polish clubs, including multiple stints at AZS Poznań teams and MUKS Poznań. She joined BC Polkowice for the 2021–22 season, winning the Polish Championship and national cups. Since 2022, she has represented AZS-UMCS Lublin in the Basket Liga Kobiet.

She has also competed in the FIBA EuroCup Women since 2021.

== National team ==
Zięmborska has represented Poland at various youth and senior levels. Her international career includes:

=== 5x5 basketball ===
- Gold medal at the FIBA U16 Women's European Championship Division B (2016)
- Participation in the FIBA U18 Women's European Championship (2018, 11th place)

=== 3x3 basketball ===
- Bronze medal at the FIBA 3x3 U23 Nations League (2021)
- Member of the senior Poland 3x3 national team since 2022

== Achievements ==
=== Club ===
Senior level

- Polish Champion: 2022 (with BC Polkowice), 2023 (with AZS-UMCS Lublin)
- Polish Cup winner: 2022
- Polish SuperCup winner: 2022
- Polish Cup finalist: 2024
- Third place in Polish 1st league: 2016
- EuroCup Women participant: since 2021

Youth level

- Polish U22 Champion: 2019
- Polish U22 Bronze medalist: 2020
- Polish U18 Silver medalist: 2017

=== Individual awards ===
- MVP of Polish 1st League Group B: 2021
- All-Tournament Team selections:
  - Polish U22 Championship (2020)
  - Polish U16 Championship (2016)
