= Andorra women's national 3x3 team =

National 3x3 basketball team

Andorra
- Joined FIBA: 1988
- FIBA zone: FIBA Europe
- National federation: FAB

FIBA 3x3 World Championships
- Appearances: 5

FIBA Europe 3x3 Championships
- Appearances: none
Home	Away

The Andorra women's national 3x3 team is the 3x3 basketball team representing Andorra in international competitions, organized and run by the Andorran Basketball Federation.

== Senior Competitions ==
=== Performance at World Championships ===
Year	Pos	Pld	W	L
(Greece) 2012	Did not enter			
(Russia) 2014	24th	5	0	5
(China) 2016	16th	4	1	3
(France) 2017	14th	4	1	3
(Philippines) 2018	20th	4	0	4
(Netherlands) 2019	18th	4	0	4

=== Performance at European Games ===
Year	Pos	Pld	W	L
(Azerbaijan) 2015	Did not qualify			

=== Performance at Europe Championships ===
Year	Final tournament				Qualifier		
Year	Pos	Pld	W	L	Pld	W	L
(Romania) 2014	Did not qualify				4	1	3
(Romania) 2016	Did not qualify				4	0	4
(Netherlands) 2017	Did not qualify				4	0	4

== See also ==
- Andorra men's national 3x3 team
