= Noor Driessen =

Dutch basketball player (born 1999)

Personal information
- Born: 22 August 1999 (age 27) Noordwijk, Netherlands
- Listed height: 1.78 m (5 ft 10 in)

Career information
- Playing career: 2014–present
- Position: Shooting guard

Career history
- 2014–2021: Grasshoppers
- 2021–2023: GiroLive Panthers Osnabrück
- 2023–2025: Grasshoppers
- 2025-present: Innova-tsn Leganés

Career highlights
- 4x WBL champion (2018, 2019, 2024, 2025); 2x Carla de Liefde Trophy winner (2024, 2025); 2x Supercup winner (2023, 2024)
Medals
Women's 3x3 basketball
Representing Netherlands
FIBA 3x3 World Cup
| Gold medal – first place | 2025 Ulaanbaatar | Team |
| Bronze medal – third place | 2026 Warsaw | Team |
Europe Cup
| Gold medal – first place | 2023 Jerusalem |
| Gold medal – first place | 2025 Copenhagen | Team |
| Gold medal – first place | 2026 Antwerp | Team |
| Silver medal – second place | 2022 Graz |
| Bronze medal – third place | 2024 Vienna | Team |

Noortje Driessen (born 22 August 1999) is a Dutch professional basketball player for Innova-tsn Leganés of Liga Femenina Endesa. Standing at 5 ft 10 in (1.78 m), she plays in the shooting guard position. She previously played for Grasshoppers and has also been a member of the Dutch senior and 3x3 national team.

== Professional career ==
Driessen began her career in 2014 with Grasshoppers. Her team won the Dutch championship for the first time in 2018. In 2021, Driessen moved to GiroLive Panthers Osnabrück. Two years later, she returned to Grasshoppers, where her team won the Dutch championship and Carla de Liefde Trophy again in 2024 and 2025.

For the 2025–2026 season, Driessen signed with Innova-tsn Leganés, where in her first season with the club, she recorded recording 9.8 points per game, 1.8 rebounds per game, and 1.2 assists per game.

== National team career ==
With the Dutch national 3x3 team, Driessen won the silver medal at the 3x3 Europe Cups of 2022 and the gold medal in 2023. Her team also won the bronze medal in 2024. In 2025, Driessen was part of the Dutch national 3x3 team for the 3x3 World Cup, where they won gold. Later that year, she won gold again at the FIBA 3x3 Europe Cup. At the 2026 3x3 World Cup, she won bronze.

== Personal life ==
Driessen is the younger sister of Jan Driessen who also plays basketball.
