= Poland women's national 3x3 team =

National 3x3 basketball team

Poland
- FIBA ranking: 4
- FIBA zone: FIBA Europe
- National federation: Polish Basketball Association

World Cup
- Appearances: 5

Europe Cup
- Appearances: 5

The Poland women's national 3x3 team is a national basketball team of Poland, administered by the Polski Zwiazek Koszykówki. It represents the country in international 3x3 (3 against 3) women's basketball competitions.

== Tournament record ==
=== World Cup ===
Year	Position	Pld	W	L
(Greece) 2012 Athens	Did not qualify			
(Russia) 2014 Moscow	Did not qualify			
(China) 2016 Guangzhou	13th	4	1	3
(France) 2017 Nantes	Did not qualify			
(Philippines) 2018 Bocaue	Did not qualify			
(Netherlands) 2019 Amsterdam	Did not qualify			
(Belgium) 2022 Antwerp	6th	4	3	1
(Austria) 2023 Vienna	19th	4	0	4
(Mongolia) 2025 Ulaanbaatar	4th	8	5	3
(Poland) 2026 Warsaw	16th	4	1	3
2027 Singapore	To be determined			
Total	5/11	24	10	14

=== Europe Cup ===
Year	Position	Pld	W	L
(Romania) 2014 Bucharest	Did not qualify			
(Romania) 2016 Bucharest	Did not qualify			
(Netherlands) 2017 Amsterdam	Did not qualify			
(Romania) 2018 Bucharest	Did not qualify			
(Hungary) 2019 Debrecen	12th	2	0	2
(France) 2021 Paris	Did not qualify			
(Austria) 2022 Graz	3rd	5	4	1
(Israel) 2023 Jerusalem	Did not qualify			
(Austria) 2024 Vienna	4th	5	3	2
(Denmark) 2025 Copenhagen	6th	3	1	2
(Belgium) 2026 Antwerp	10th	2	0	2
Total	5/11	17	8	9

== See also ==
- Poland women's national basketball team
