= United States women's national under-18 3x3 team =

USA Women's under-18 3x3 team

United States
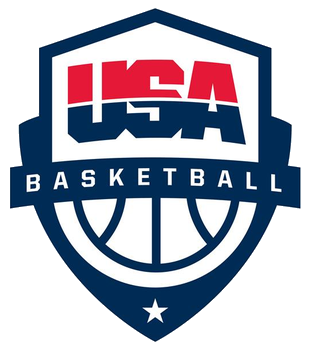
- FIBA zone: FIBA Americas
- National federation: USA Basketball

FIBA 3x3 U18 World Cup
- Appearances: 11
- Medals: Gold: (2012, 2013, 2017, 2019, 2021, 2022, 2023, 2024); Silver: (2015, 2016)

Youth Olympic Games
- Appearances: 3
- Medals: Gold: (2014, 2018); Bronze: (2010)
Medal record
FIBA 3x3 U18 World Cup
| Gold medal – first place | 2012 Alcobendas |
| Gold medal – first place | 2013 Jakarta |
| Gold medal – first place | 2017 Chengdu |
| Gold medal – first place | 2019 Ulaanbaatar |
| Gold medal – first place | 2021 Debrecen |
| Gold medal – first place | 2022 Debrecen |
| Gold medal – first place | 2023 Debrecen |
| Gold medal – first place | 2024 Debrecen |
| Silver medal – second place | 2015 Debrecen |
| Silver medal – second place | 2016 Astana |
Youth Olympic Games
| Gold medal – first place | 2014 Nanjing | Team |
| Gold medal – first place | 2018 Buenos Aires | Team |
| Bronze medal – third place | 2010 Singapore | Team |

The USA Women's under-18 3x3 Teams are two of the under-18 3x3 basketball teams under the auspices of the USA Basketball organization. In 2011, International Basketball Federation (FIBA) held the FIBA 3x3 U18 World Cup. It is an 3x3 under-18 basketball tournament held in every year. But the tournament was not held in 2014 and 2018 due to 3x3 basketball being an event at the 2014 Summer Youth Olympics and 2018 Summer Youth Olympics. In 2020, it was not held due to COVID-19 pandemic.

As of 2024, the team has won eight times 3x3 U18 World Cup titles. Also the team won two times Youth Olympic Games gold medals.

== Tournament record ==
=== FIBA 3x3 U18 World Cup ===
| Year | Result | Position | Pld | W | L |
|---|---|---|---|---|---|
| (Italy) 2011 | Fourth place | 4th | | | |
| (Spain) 2012 | Champions | 1st | | | |
| (Indonesia) 2013 | Champions | 1st | | | |
| (Hungary) 2015 | Runners-up | 2nd | | | |
| (Kazakhstan) 2016 | Runners-up | 2nd | | | |
| (China) 2017 | Champions | 1st | 7 | 7 | 0 |
| (Mongolia) 2019 | Champions | 1st | 7 | 7 | 0 |
| (Hungary) 2021 | Champions | 1st | 7 | 6 | 1 |
| (Hungary) 2022 | Champions | 1st | 7 | 7 | 0 |
| (Hungary) 2023 | Champions | 1st | 7 | 7 | 0 |
| (Hungary) 2024 | Champions | 1st | 7 | 7 | 0 |
| Total | 8 Titles | 11/11 | | | |

=== Youth Olympic Games ===
| Year | Result | Position | Pld | W | L |
|---|---|---|---|---|---|
| (Singapore) 2010 | Bronze medalists | 3rd | 7 | 6 | 1 |
| (China) 2014 | Gold medalists | 1st | 13 | 13 | 0 |
| (Argentina) 2018 | Gold medalists | 1st | 7 | 7 | 0 |
| (Senegal) 2026 | To be determined | | | | |
| Total | 2 Titles | 3/4 | 27 | 26 | 1 |

== U18 record ==
- 2010 6–1 3rd
- 2011 7–2 4th (honorary bronze)
- 2012 7–1 1st
- 2013 8–1 1st
- 2014 9–0 1st
- 2015 7–1 2nd
- 2016 5–2 2nd
- 2017 7–0 1st
- 2018 7–0 1st

== 2010 U18 ==
Kathy Richey-Walton was named to coach the U18 team selected to compete in the first ever Youth Olympic Games which was held in Singapore from August 14 to 26 2010. The players selected for the team were:

- Briyona Canty
- Andraya Carter
- Amber Henson
- Kiah Stokes

Stokes led the team in scoring in the first game against Angola. She scored 12 points, to help the team win 20–8. She went on to score 19 points in the game against the host country Singapore, helping the team to win 34–11. Henson took over the scoring leadership ant he third game, with 14 points in a 33–6 win over Germany. The USA team then went on to beat Belarus and Korea, but was challenged in the next game against Australia. The USA had a 15–7 lead, but Australia tied the game in regulation and went on to win in overtime. The final game was against Canada for the bronze medal. Canty was the scoring leader with 15 points, and the USA won 34–16 to secure the bronze medal finish.

== 2011 U18 ==
Following the inaugural 3x3 event at the Youth Olympics, in 2011, FIBA held the first 3x3 U18 (Youth) World Championship For Women. The event was held in Rimini, Italy, September 9–11, 2011. The teams no longer had coaches, but did have USA Basketball representative as a team leader. Jamie Carey served as the team leader in 2011. The players selected for the team were:

- Kaela Davis
- Rebecca Greenwell
- Linnae Harper
- Taya Reimer

The USA team won their first three games easily, reaching 21 points before the opposition reached double-digits. However, in the third game, against Guam, Reimer injured her right ankle and was unable to play in any further contests. With only four players, this meant the remaining three players had to play all minutes without a substitution. The next game was against Italy, and the USA team won, but by a much closer score than in previous contests, 16–13. The three-player team then took on and defeated Sweden and India. This qualified them for the medal rounds. In the quarterfinals against the Czech Republic, the game went to double-overtime, but the USA team emerged victorious with a 25–23 win.

The win sent the team to the semi-finals against Italy, a team the USA had defeated in a close match earlier. However, less than two minutes into the game, Greenwell suffered a knee injury. The game was delayed for 90 minutes, but Greenwell was unable to continue. The game was restarted, with the USA team fielding only two players against Italy's three players. Despite the handicap, the USA team took the game to overtime, but lost in the sudden death period. The team was scheduled to play against Japan for the bronze medal, but forfeited due to the injuries and finished in fourth place. A team can finish with two players, but must have three players to start a game. FIBA decided to award the team honorary bronze medals to recognize the effort.

== 2012 U18 ==
After the first event, FIBA decided that the U18 event would be held on an annual basis. The second FIBA 3x3 U18 (Youth) World Championship For Women was held in Alcobendas, Spain, September 28–30, 2012. The team which qualified for the event had the following players:

- Kaela Davis
- Diamond DeShields
- Erica McCall
- Brianna Turner

Davis was the only player with prior experience in international competition. The games are intended to be played outdoors, but rain forced the games indoors for the first two days. The USA team won their first four games easily. In the second match of the second day, the USA faced China. Both DeShields and Davis fouled out, leaving McCall and Turner to play two on three. They took the game to overtime, but fell to China 13–12. Despite the loss, the team was still the number one seed for the medal rounds.

The USA faced Estonia in the quarterfinals, and won 21–15. This set up a semi-final game against Australia, which the USA team won 21–13. The gold medal game was against the host team, Spain. Although Spain scored first, the USA team took a lead and never relinquished it, winning the game 21–13 to win the first ever gold medal for the US in U18 3x3 event.

== 2013 U18 ==
The third FIBA 3x3 U18 (Youth) World Championship For Women was held in Jakarta, Indonesia, September 26–29, 2013. The team which qualified for the event had the following players:

- Gabby Green
- Arike Ogunbowale
- Katie Lou Samuelson
- Brianna Turner

Turner was a repeat team member from the 2012 team. The USA team started strong, giving up only two points each to Guam and Puerto Rico, winning each game 21–2. The third game was against China, who proved a stronger opponent. China was hitting outside shots, worth two points, and late in the game the score was tied at 15 points each. Then Ogunbowale scored three points on a basket a foul shot and a basket to give the USA team the lead. She then passed to Turner inside to push the score to the final score 19–16. In their next game the USA team lost to Lithuania 11–9. The team bounced back with a win over Spain. In the first knock-out round, the USA team beat Thailand 21–14 to reach the quarterfinals. France was the opponent in the quarterfinals, and proved a tough competitor. The USA won by only two points, 17–15. That set up a semi-final match against Spain, which the USA team won 15–10. The gold medal game was against Estonia, who came into the game with the same record as the USA 7–1. The USA won 21–12 to win the gold medal.

== 2014 U18 ==
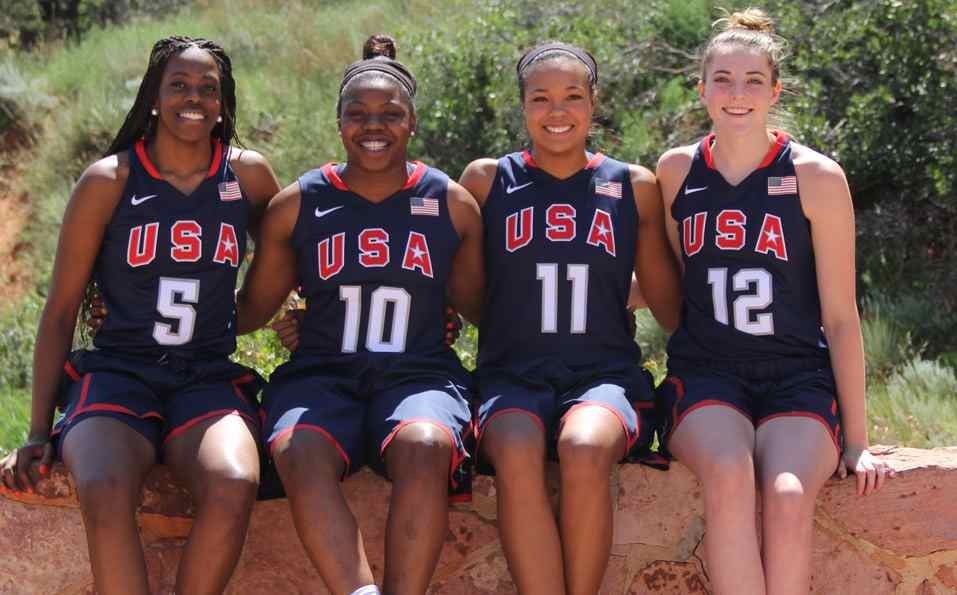
USA U18 3x3 team 2014. De'janae Boykin, Arike Ogunbowale, Napheesa Collier, Katie Lou Samuelson

The U18 event in 2014 was held as part of the Youth Olympic Games held in Nanjing, China, August 16–28, 2014.

The players for the USA team were:

- De'janae Boykin
- Napheesa Collier
- Arike Ogunbowale
- Katie Lou Samuelson

Samuelson turned an ankle prior to the event, so was unable to play in some games, and had limited minutes in others. This mean the remaining three player had to play without substitution in some matches. Despite that, the team started out well. The USA team started with a 21–3 win over Romania, followed by victories over Indonesia, Egypt, and Thailand. Samuelson was able to play in the game against Belgium hitting five of six field goal attempts.

On Thursday, August 21, a shoot-out contest was held. Samuelson placed third out of 158 contestants, winning a bronze medal.

After the individual events, the USA team continued to win. Samuelson was able to play, though with limited court time in some of the remaining games. The USA team beat Estonia in the quarterfinal 21–12, then Hungary in the semi-final 21–14. This set up the gold medal match against the undefeated Netherlands team, which the USA team won 19–10, to end the event with a perfect 9–0 record.

== 2015 U18 ==
The U18 event in 2015 was held in Debrecen, Hungary, June 4–7, 2015.

The players for the USA team were:

- Kristine Anigwe
- Natalie Chou
- Erin Boley
- Arike Ogunbowale

Asia Durr played on the Defend team, which won 2015 USA Basketball 3×3 U18 National Tournament along with the right to represent the US at the World Championships, but she suffered a muscle injury, and had to withdraw. She was replaced by Erin Boley, a player on the Southern Starz team, and the winner of the qualifying tournament MVP award.

After winning their opening game against Switzerland in overtime, the USA team went on to win their next six games. They were undefeated entering the gold medal game against France. The USA team had a 12–9 lead halfway through the game, but France responded with a 9–3. The USA team tied the game twice, but France hit a free throw with 17 seconds left in the game to win 20–19, and earn the gold medal. The USA finished second, earning the silver medal.

== 2016 U18 ==
The U18 event in 2016 was held in Astana, Kazakhstan, June 5–8, 2016.

The players for the USA team were:

- Jaelyn Brown
- Sidney Cooks
- Amber Ramirez
- Megan Walker

In the opening game against the Netherlands, the USA team led early and held an 8–5 lead after four minutes. The Netherlands then began to hit baskets and outscored the USA 8–1 to take a four-point lead with under four minutes to go and continued on to the 21–13 win. The USA played later in the day against Poland and won 21–15. The USA then won their next four games which qualified them for the championship game against France, who led most of the way, with as much as a nine-point lead at one time. The USA cut the lead to six but France scored three more points to win the game 21–12. France won the gold medal while the USA earned a silver medal for the second year in a row.

== 2017 U18 ==
The U18 event in 2017 was held in Chengdu, China from June 28 to July 2, 2017.

The players for the USA team were:

- Aquira DeCosta
- Destiny Littleton
- Christyn Williams
- Janelle Bailey

Team USA defeated the Czech Republic to win the gold medal.

== 2018 U18 ==
The U18 event in 2018 was held as part of the Youth Olympic Games held in Buenos Aires, Argentina, October 7–17, 2018.

The players for the USA team were:

- Aliyah Boston
- Samantha Brunelle
- Paige Bueckers
- Hailey van Lith

The team won every game in pool play to take a 4–0 record into the knock-out round. They beat the Netherlands in the quarterfinal game 18–14, then China in the semi-final 21–9. This set up the gold medal match against France, which the USA team won 18–4, to end the event with a perfect 9–0 record.

== 2019 U18 ==
The players for the USA team were:

- Olivia Cochran
- Madison Hayes
- Rickea Jackson
- Hailey Van Lith

== 2021 U18 ==
The players for the USA team were:

- Janiah Barker
- Ayanna Patterson
- Kiki Rice
- Mikaylah Williams

== 2022 U18 ==
The players for the USA team were:

- KK Arnold
- Sarah Strong
- Sahara Williams
- Mikaylah Williams

== 2023 U18 ==
The players for the USA team were:

- Katie Fiso
- Sarah Strong
- Sahara Williams
- Mikaylah Williams

== 2024 U18 ==
The players for the USA team were:

- Jazzy Davidson
- Saniyah Hall
- Arianna Roberson
- Sarah Strong
