= 2025 NCAA Division I women's basketball championship game =

American collegiate basketball final

National championship game
UConn Huskies	South Carolina Gamecocks
Big East	SEC
(36–3)	(35–3)
82	59
Head coach: Geno Auriemma	Head coach: Dawn Staley
- AP: 3
- Coaches: 3
- AP: 2
- Coaches: 2
	1	2	3	4	Total
UConn Huskies	19	17	26	20	82
South Carolina Gamecocks	14	12	16	17	59
- Date: April 6, 2025
- Venue: Amalie Arena, Tampa, Florida
- MVP: Azzi Fudd, UConn
- Favorite: UConn by 5.5
- Referees: Gina Cross; Maj Forsberg; Felicia Grinter
- Attendance: 19,777
- National anthem: Ayla Brown

United States TV coverage
- Network: ABC
- Announcers: Ryan Ruocco (play-by-play); Rebecca Lobo (analyst); Holly Rowe (sideline)
- Nielsen Ratings: 4.3 (8.6 million)

The 2025 NCAA Division I women's basketball championship game was the final game of the 2025 NCAA Division I women's basketball tournament. It determined the champion of the 2024–25 NCAA Division I women's basketball season and was contested by the No. 2 seed UConn Huskies from the Big East Conference and the No. 1 seed South Carolina Gamecocks from the Southeastern Conference (SEC). This was a rematch of the 2022 championship game. The game was played on April 6, 2025, at Amalie Arena in Tampa, Florida. UConn defeated South Carolina, 82–59, to win the school's twelfth national championship and their first since 2016.

The teams traded the lead for much of the first quarter; South Carolina's Te-Hina Paopao scored the game's first points, and Sarah Strong, Chloe Kitts, Paige Bueckers, Azzi Fudd, and Raven Johnson all scored in the first five minutes, after which UConn led by one point. The final four minutes of the first quarter saw only four points scored, all by UConn. The Huskies' lead expanded to nine early in the second, and, despite a South Carolina effort that brought the deficit to three points with about six minutes remaining, the Huskies pushed the lead back up to eleven and ultimately entered halftime with a ten-point advantage. By halfway through the third quarter, UConn's lead was thirteen; another offensive run by the Huskies resulted in a 20-point lead at the end of the third quarter. KK Arnold scored seven points for UConn in the fourth quarter, and the Huskies totaled twenty as a team, finishing the game 23-point winners.

== Participants ==
=== UConn Huskies ===
The UConn Huskies, representing the University of Connecticut in Storrs, Connecticut, were led by head coach Geno Auriemma in his 40th season. The Huskies were ranked No. 2 in the preseason AP Poll and received two of thirty first-place votes. They received a No. 1 preseason ranking from Sports Illustrated and were voted first in the preseason Big East Conference coaches' poll. The return of redshirt senior guard Paige Bueckers was cited by many previews as a major benefit to UConn, along with redshirt junior guard Azzi Fudd and several incoming players, including freshman forward Sarah Strong and guard Kaitlyn Chen, a graduate transfer from Princeton. Isabel Gonzalez of CBS Sports predicted that UConn would win the national championship, with Bueckers cited as a major reason.

The Huskies began their season 4–0, including a neutral-site win over No. 14 North Carolina and a home victory over Fairleigh Dickinson; the latter was Auriemma's 2,017th career victory as a head coach, breaking the record previously set by Stanford's Tara VanDerveer. The team won the Baha Mar Women's Championship with wins over Oregon State in the semifinal and Ole Miss in the championship. They earned another ranked win, over No. 22 Louisville, before suffering their first loss in an away contest at No. 8 Notre Dame. Less than two weeks later, they lost by two points to No. 7 USC, dropping the Huskies to a 10–2 record. From there, they won their next eleven games, all Big East Conference matchups, before suffering a non-conference loss at No. 19 Tennessee on February 6. In addition to wins in each of their last six conference games, earning them a perfect 18–0 Big East record, the Huskies defeated No. 4 South Carolina by 29 points on February 16, snapping the Gamecocks' 71-game home winning streak. The Huskies' conference record earned them the Big East regular season championship and the No. 1 seed at the Big East women's basketball tournament. There, they defeated (8) St. John's, (5) Villanova, and (2) Creighton en route to their fifth consecutive Big East tournament title.

UConn received the Big East's automatic invitation to the NCAA Tournament by virtue of their conference tournament championship and were selected as the No. 2 seed in the Spokane Regional 4. In their regional, the Huskies defeated (15) Arkansas State and (10) South Dakota State in Storrs to reach the regional semifinal. At Spokane Arena in Spokane, Washington, they defeated (3) Oklahoma to reach the regional final and beat (1) USC in a regular-season rematch, 78–64, to advance to the national semifinals in Tampa, Florida. In the Final Four, the Huskies met (1) UCLA, champions of the Spokane Regional 1. UConn never trailed in the game and converted a 20-point halftime lead into a 34-point victory, sending them to the national championship for the first time since 2022. The Huskies entered seeking their first championship victory since a defeat of Syracuse in 2016.

=== South Carolina Gamecocks ===
The South Carolina Gamecocks, representing the University of South Carolina in Columbia, South Carolina, were led by head coach Dawn Staley in her 17th season. The Gamecocks entered the season as defending national champions after defeating Iowa in the previous year's championship game, and they entered the 2024–25 season as the preseason AP No. 1 team, having received 27 of the 30 available first-place votes. They were selected first in the preseason Southeastern Conference (SEC) media poll—which also named Te-Hina Paopao, Raven Johnson, and MiLaysia Fulwiley as all-SEC selections—and were likewise picked first in the preseason SEC coaches' poll. Talia Goodman of On3.com ranked the Gamecocks first in her preseason SEC power rankings and projected that they would once again contend for a national title.

The Gamecocks began their national title defense with a six-point win over Michigan in the Hall of Fame Series in Las Vegas and earned another neutral-site win, over No. 9 NC State in Charlotte, before their home opener, a win over Coppin State. They suffered their first loss at No. 5 UCLA on November 24 but entered SEC play with a 12–1 record, including wins over No. 15 Iowa State in the Fort Myers Tip-Off, No. 8 Duke in the ACC–SEC Challenge, and No. 9 TCU in the Coast-to-Coast Challenge. In conference play, the Gamecocks scored ranked wins over No. 5 Texas, No. 19 Alabama, No. 13 Oklahoma, No. 5 LSU, and No. 18 Tennessee, all consecutively; later in the schedule, they lost at No. 4 Texas, snapping a 57-game regular-season conference winning streak, and they defeated No. 15 Kentucky to conclude the conference schedule. On February 16, they lost in a non-conference home game against No. 7 UConn. The Gamecocks' 15–1 conference record earned them a share of the conference regular season title, and they won the No. 1 seed in the SEC tournament over Texas on a coin flip. There, they defeated (10) Vanderbilt, (5) Oklahoma, and (2) Texas to win their ninth SEC tournament championship.

South Carolina received the SEC's automatic bid to the NCAA Tournament and were seeded No. 1 in the Birmingham Regional 2. They hosted (16) Tennessee Tech and (9) Indiana in the first two rounds and won both games to advance to the regional semifinal round at Legacy Arena in Birmingham, Alabama. The Gamecocks defeated (4) Maryland by four points to advance to the regional final, and they eliminated (2) Duke by seven points to reach their fifth consecutive Final Four. In their national semifinal matchup, South Carolina met (1) Texas, champions of the Birmingham Regional 3, for the teams' fourth meeting of the season. South Carolina beat Texas, 74–57, to reach the national title game. They entered seeking their fourth overall, and second consecutive, national championship.

== Starting lineups ==
UConn	Position		South Carolina
Sarah Strong	F		Chloe Kitts
Jana El-Alfy	C	F	Sania Feagin
Kaitlyn Chen	G		Bree Hall
Azzi Fudd	G		Raven Johnson
Paige Bueckers	G		Te-Hina Paopao
Source: ESPN

== Game summary ==
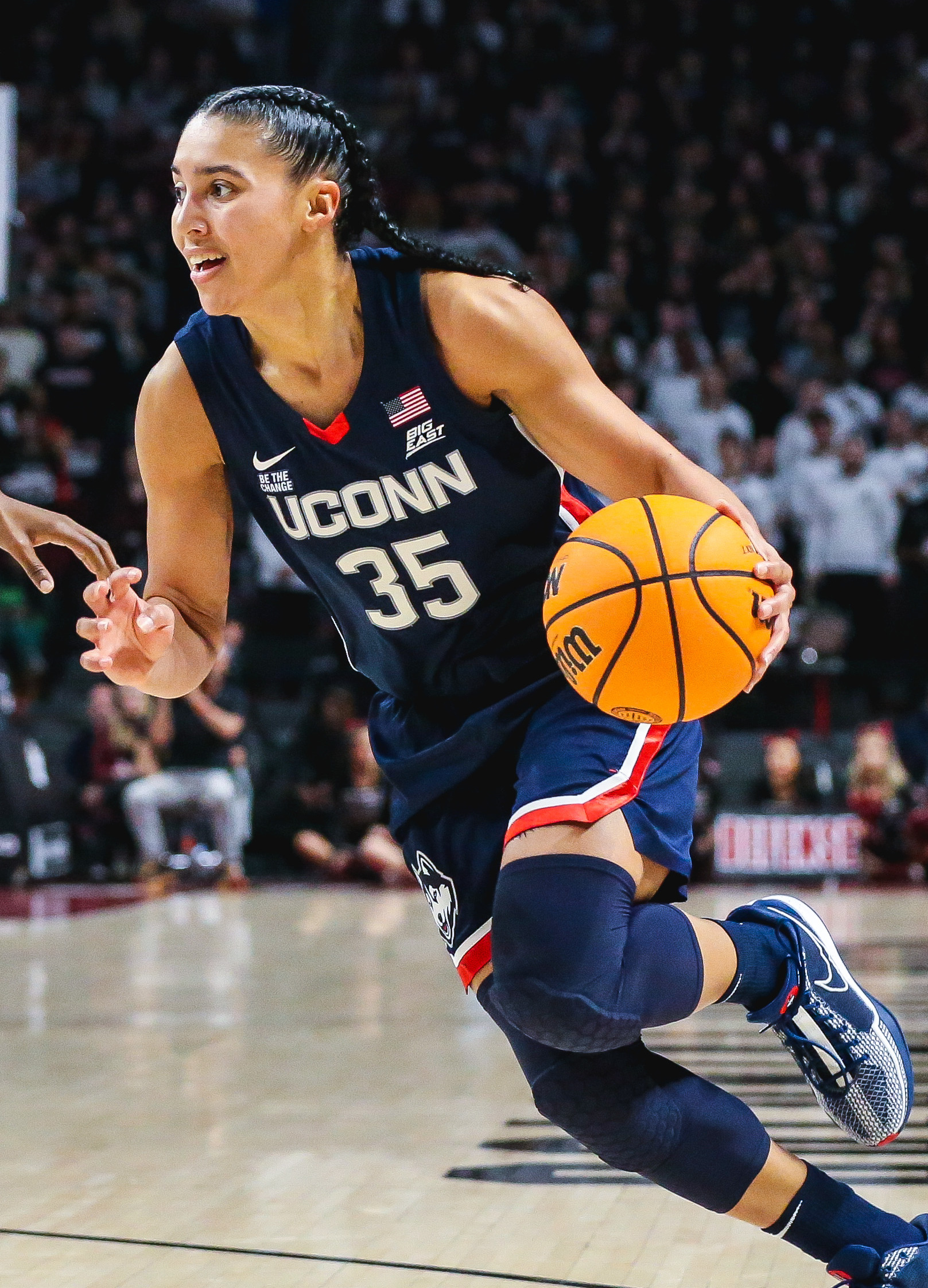
UConn's Azzi Fudd (pictured in 2025) scored 24 points and was named Most Outstanding Player.

The game began with UConn winning the opening tip, though the Gamecocks were first to score on a three-point jump shot by Te-Hina Paopao after Kaitlyn Chen's three-point attempt was unsuccessful on the Huskies' first possession. Sarah Strong opened the scoring for UConn, and the teams traded jump shots for the following minute of play as Chloe Kitts scored for the Gamecocks and Paige Bueckers scored for the Huskies. UConn took their first lead about a minute later on a two-point jump shot by Azzi Fudd, though South Carolina quickly retook the lead on a layup by Raven Johnson. The lead continued to go back-and-forth on two-point shots made by Chen and Strong for the Huskies and Hall and Kitts for the Gamecocks. A jumper by Fudd with just over five minutes remaining in the quarter reestablished a one-point UConn lead, 12–11, and they maintained that lead until the end of the quarter; Fudd made a free throw shortly after, and Jana El-Alfy scored a layup to push the lead to four points with 4:37 to play. A field goal and free throw by Joyce Edwards brought South Carolina back within one point, but the final 3:59 saw only two made shots—a layup by Fudd with 3:26 and a jumper by Bueckers with five seconds remaining—and UConn took a five-point lead into the first quarter break. UConn scored the first four points of the second quarter on shots by Bueckers and Strong, making eight unanswered points for the Huskies and pushing their lead to nine. South Carolina responded with two made shots of their own, an Edwards jumper and a Sania Feagin layup, to bring themselves back within five points. Each teams' next pair of points came from the free throw line, and Feagin brought the South Carolina deficit down to three on a made jump shot with just under six minutes left in the half. From there, UConn went on another 8–0 run which included six points from Fudd, pushing the lead to eleven. After a Tessa Johnson three-pointer and a Maryam Dauda free throw for the Gamecocks, UConn's Ashlynn Shade scored the half's final points on a three-pointer with nine seconds left, sending the game to halftime with a 36–26 UConn lead.

The second half began with nearly a minute without scoring before Fudd made a pair of free throws; Kitts scored the quarter's first field goal for the Gamecocks on a layup on the next possession. The next three minutes of game time contained only three made field goals, all by UConn, in addition to one free throw from Kitts. Trailing 44–29 with 5:34 left in the quarter, the Gamecocks scored six of the game's next ten points to enter the under-five media timeout at a thirteen-point deficit. MiLaysia Fulwiley and Feagin scored South Carolina's points out of the timeout, though a pair of free throws by Bueckers and a three-pointer by Fudd enabled UConn to expand their lead. Following a free throw by Edwards, Strong hit another UConn three-pointer to begin a 6–0 Husky run ended by Tessa Johnson's free throws for the Gamecocks. Strong and Shade then scored three points from the free throw line for the Huskies to end the quarter with a twenty-point lead. UConn's KK Arnold began the fourth quarter by expanding her team's lead on a layup and subsequent free throw; following two successful Maddy McDaniel free throws for South Carolina, Arnold made another to put the Huskies up by 22 points. Bueckers and Strong scored the game's next seven points, and Fulwiley, Arnold, and Strong all made shots over the next two minutes. A layup by Arnold made UConn's lead 80–48 with four minutes to play, though Johnson and Edwards scored a field goal apiece for the Gamecocks following the media timeout. A layup by Strong with 2:58 remaining marked UConn's final scoring play of the game, and South Carolina recorded six final points via McDaniel and Fulwiley before the clock expired, giving UConn an 82–59 national championship victory.

ABC

April 6, 2025
3:00 p.m. EDT

Report

No. 2 UConn Huskies 82, No. 1 South Carolina Gamecocks 59
Scoring by quarter: 19–14, 17–12, 26–16, 20–17
Pts: Fudd, Strong – 24; Rebs: Strong – 15; Asts: Strong – 5	Pts: Edwards, T. Johnson – 10; Rebs: R. Johnson – 7 Asts: Fulwiley – 4

Amalie Arena – Tampa, Florida
Attendance: 19,777
Referees: Felicia Grinter, Maj Forsberg, Gina Cross

Starters:			Pts	Reb	Ast
F	21	Sarah Strong	24	15	5
C	8	Jana El-Alfy	2	2	0
G	20	Kaitlyn Chen	2	1	4
G	35	Azzi Fudd	24	5	1
G	5	Paige Bueckers	17	6	3
Reserves:					
G	25	Ice Brady	0	0	0
G	44	Aubrey Griffin	0	2	0
G	11	Allie Ziebell	0	0	0
G	12	Ashlynn Shade	4	2	2
G	10	Qadence Samuels	0	0	0
G	2	KK Arnold	9	0	3
G	33	Caroline Ducharme	0	0	0
Head coach:
Geno Auriemma

UConn	South Carolina

UConn	Statistics	South Carolina
30/62 (48%)	Field goals	21/61 (34%)
4/17 (24%)	3-pt field goals	4/16 (25%)
18/21 (86%)	Free throws	13/18 (72%)
14	Offensive rebounds	17
26	Defensive rebounds	19
40	Total rebounds	36
18	Assists	9
9	Turnovers	11
8	Steals	6
5	Blocks	4
19	Fouls	17

Starters:			Pts	Reb	Ast
F	21	Chloe Kitts	9	6	1
F	20	Sania Feagin	8	3	0
G	23	Bree Hall	2	2	0
G	25	Raven Johnson	2	7	1
G	0	Te-Hina Paopao	3	3	1
Reserves:					
F	8	Joyce Edwards	10	5	1
F	30	Maryam Dauda	1	1	0
G	1	Maddy McDaniel	5	1	1
G	12	MiLaysia Fulwiley	9	2	4
G	5	Tessa Johnson	10	3	0
Head coach:
Dawn Staley

== Media coverage ==
The championship game was televised in the United States by ABC. Ryan Ruocco was the play-by-play commentator, Rebecca Lobo was the analyst, and Holly Rowe was the sideline reporter. ESPN offered an alternate broadcast hosted by The Bird & Taurasi Show with Sue Bird and Diana Taurasi. ESPN received backlash for a post made on its ESPN Women's Hoops Twitter account several days before the game in which a comment made by Dawn Staley about Paige Bueckers was misrepresented as being a slight at Bueckers; Staley herself asked for the headline, which read "Dawn Staley says narrative around Paige Bueckers and her quest to win a national title has overshadowed South Carolina's feats", to be altered.

Ruocco drew praise for his call, particularly the double entendre using Bueckers's first name, during the final inbound play of the game and the subsequent UConn celebrations:

And there's the buzzer! It's an even dozen for Geno Auriemma and Connecticut! The final page [Paige] in the book of Bueckers is title number twelve for UConn!

— Ryan Ruocco on ABC's TV broadcast

Nielsen ratings reported that the final game averaged 8.6 million viewers. The matchup drew 9.8 million viewers—the third most-watched women's championship basketball game in the United States, and a 75 percent increase from the same UConn versus South Carolina championship matchup in 2022.

== Aftermath ==
UConn's national championship victory marked the 12th title in school history and the first in nine years. Their 23-point win was the third-largest in NCAA Division I championship game history, behind 33- and 31-point UConn wins in 2013 and 2016, respectively. Azzi Fudd, who is set to return to UConn in 2025–26, was named Most Outstanding Player (MOP). In addition to being UConn's 12th, the championship was also the 12th for head coach Geno Auriemma.

== See also ==
- 2025 NCAA Division I men's basketball championship game
