= KK Arnold =

American basketball player (born 2005)

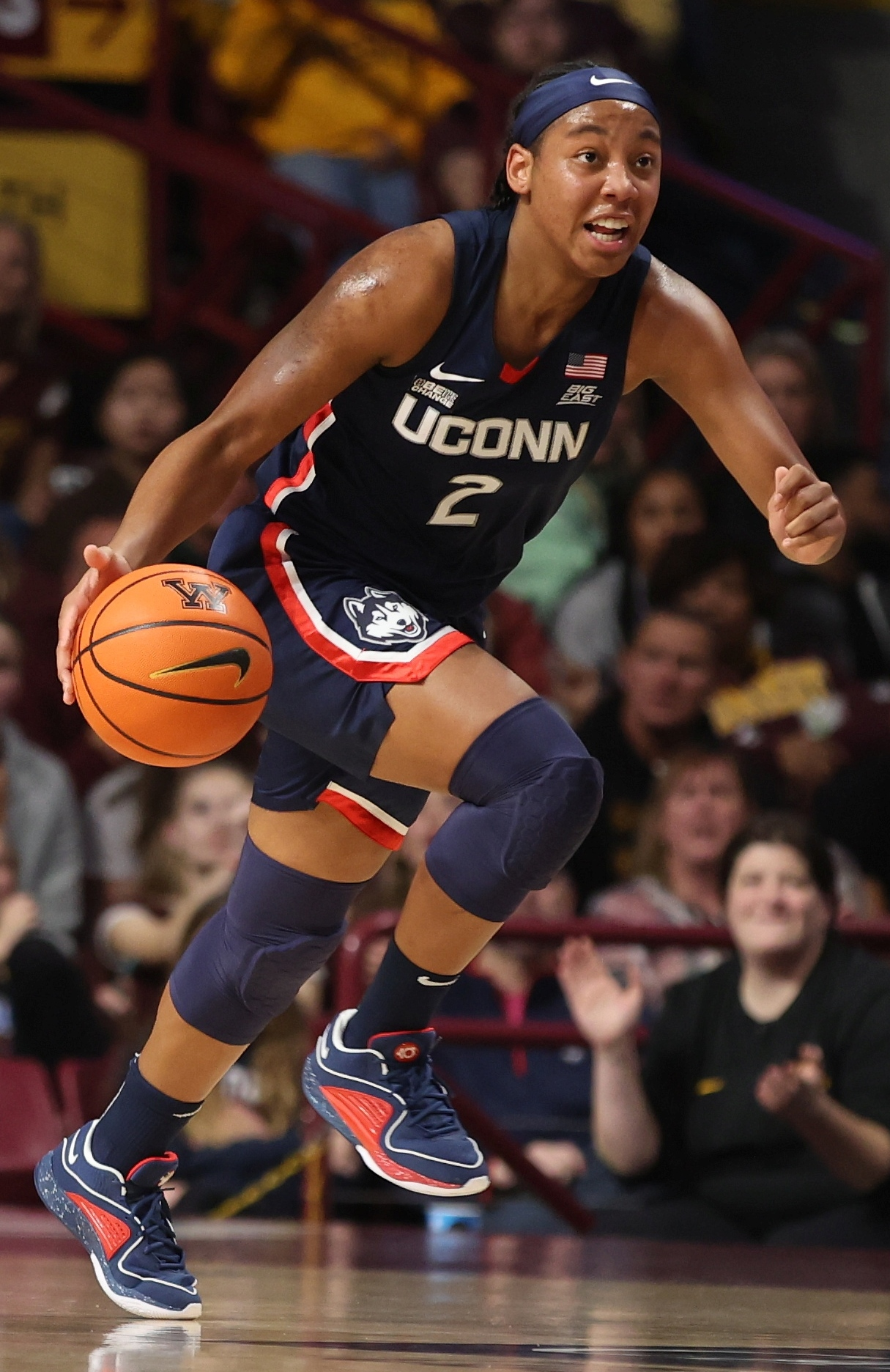
- Arnold with UConn in 2023

No. 2 – UConn Huskies
- Position: Guard
- League: Big East Conference

Personal information
- Born: May 16, 2005 (age 21) Germantown, Wisconsin, U.S.
- Listed height: 5 ft 9 in (1.75 m)

Career information
- High school: Germantown (Germantown, Wisconsin)
- College: UConn (2023–present)

Career highlights
- Big East All-First Team (2026); Big East All-Defensive Team (2026); NCAA champion (2025); Big East All-Freshman Team (2024); Wisconsin Miss Basketball (2023); McDonald's All-American (2023); Nike Hoop Summit (2023)
Medals
Women's basketball
Representing the United States
FIBA Under-16 Americas Championship
Gold medal – first place	2021 Mexico	Team
Women's 3x3 basketball
Representing the United States
FIBA 3x3 U18 World Cup
Gold medal – first place	2022 Hungary	Team

Kamorea "KK" Arnold (born May 16, 2005) is an American college basketball player for the UConn Huskies of the Big East Conference.

== Early life and high school career ==
Arnold was born to Kim and Mike Arnold, and has two older siblings, Mike and MiMi. She attended Germantown High School in Germantown, Wisconsin. During her sophomore year, she averaged 22.9 points, 6.3 rebounds, 5.1 assists and 3.8 steals per game, and was named the Wisconsin Gatorade Player of the Year, and AP Wisconsin State Player of the Year. She led the Warhawks to a 29–1 record and the Division 1 state championship, where she scored 31 points in the 63–48 championship win over Hudson. During her junior year, she averaged 24.8 points, 7.9 rebounds, 7.5 assists and 4.4 steals, and was again named the Wisconsin Gatorade Player of the Year and AP Wisconsin State Player of the Year.

During her senior year, she averaged 23.3 points, 7.7 rebounds, 7.7 assists and 3.3 steals per game, and was named the AP Wisconsin State Player of the Year for the third consecutive year. She was also named Wisconsin Miss Basketball. She had five 30-point games and four triple-doubles, including a career-high 43 points on December 8, 2022, with eight rebounds, six assists and five steals in a win over Menomonee Falls. She finished her high school career with 2,458 points, 765 rebounds, 695 assists, 415 steals and eight career triple-doubles, and was named a three-time AP Wisconsin State Player of the Year.

She was selected to play in the 2023 McDonald's All-American Girls Game and Nike Hoop Summit. She was rated a five-star recruit, and the No. 6 overall player in the class of 2023 by ESPN. She committed to play college basketball for UConn.

== College career ==
During the 2023–24 season, in her freshman year, she appeared in 39 games with 33 starts, and averaged 8.9 points, 3.1 rebounds, 3.2 assists and 2.3 steals per game. She led all freshmen in steals and assists per game while ranking third in points and fifth in rebounds per game. Following the season, she was unanimously named to the Big East All-Freshman Team.

During the 2024–25 season, in her sophomore year, she appeared in 36 games and averaged 5.4 points, 2.8 assists and 2.4 rebounds per game. During the Final Four of the 2025 NCAA Division I women's basketball tournament against UCLA, she scored nine points in 20 minutes to help UConn advance to the championship game. During the championship game, she came off the bench and scored nine points and three assists in 15 minutes, to help UConn win their record 12th national championship.

== National team career ==
Arnold represented the United States at the 2021 FIBA Under-16 Women's Americas Championship where she averaged 5.6 points and 2.0 rebounds in six games and won a gold medal. She also represented the United States at the 2022 FIBA 3x3 U18 World Cup and won a gold medal.

== Career statistics ==
Legend
GP	Games played	GS	Games started	MPG	Minutes per game	RPG	Rebounds per game
APG	Assists per game	SPG	Steals per game	BPG	Blocks per game	PPG	Points per game
TO	Turnovers per game	FG%	Field-goal percentage	3P%	3-point field-goal percentage	FT%	Free-throw percentage
**Bold**	Career best	°	League leader

*	Denotes seasons in which Arnold won an NCAA Championship

=== College ===
Year	Team	GP	GS	MPG	FG%	3P%	FT%	RPG	APG	SPG	BPG	TO	PPG
2023–24	UConn	39	**33**	**30.2**	45.9	**33.0**	67.0	**3.1**	**3.2**	**2.3**	0.1	1.9	**8.9**
2024–25*	UConn	**40**	0	21.2	**47.4**	21.3	**71.0**	2.4	2.8	1.5	0.1	**1.2**	5.5
**Career**		79	33	25.7	46.5	29.0	68.6	2.7	3.0	1.9	0.1	1.6	7.2
Statistics retrieved from Sports-Reference.

== Personal life ==
In 2024 and 2025, Arnold was invited to Kelsey Plum's Dawg Class, an Under Armour-sponsored camp to help top women college athletes transition from collegiate to professional basketball.
