= 2017 FIBA 3x3 U18 World Cup – Women's tournament =

Tournament details
- Host country: China
- City: Chengdu
- Dates: June 28–July 2, 2017
- Teams: 20
- Venue: New Century Global Center

Final positions
- Champions: United States (3rd title)
- Runners-up: Czech Republic
- Third place: Russia

The women's tournament of the 2017 FIBA 3x3 U18 World Cup host in Chengdu, China was contested by 20 teams.

== Participating teams ==
Every FIBA zone except FIBA Africa were represented. The top 20 teams, including the hosts, based on the FIBA National Federation ranking qualified for the tournament as of 01.03.2017.

FIBA Asia (6)

- Egypt (12)
- Kazakhstan (13)
- Japan (17)
- Sri Lanka (18)
- China (19)
- Singapore (20)

FIBA Africa (0)

- None

FIBA Oceania (1)

- Australia (16)

FIBA Americas (3)

- Argentina (3)
- United States (8)
- Venezuela (14)

FIBA Europe (9)

- Hungary (1)
- Netherlands (2)
- Spain (4)
- France (5)
- Russia (6)
- Andorra (7)
- Switzerland (9)
- Germany (10)
- Italy (11)
- Czech Republic (15)

== Main tournament ==
=== Preliminary round ===
==== Group A ====
Pos	Team	Pld	W	L	PF	PA	PD	Qualification	(United States)	(Hungary)	(Australia)	(Japan)	(Switzerland)
1	United States	4	4	0	73	46	+27	Qualification to knockout stage	—	13–9	20–11	21–15	19–11
2	Hungary	4	2	2	54	44	+10	Qualification to knockout stage	9–13	—	12–15	21–8	12–8
3	Australia	4	2	2	54	61	−7		11–20	15–12	—	14–16	14–13
4	Japan	4	2	2	53	68	−15		15–21	8–21	16–14	—	14–12
5	Switzerland	4	0	4	44	59	−15		11–19	8–12	13–14	12–14	—

Source: FIBA
Rules for classification: 1) Wins; 2) Head-to-Head record; 3) Points scored; 4) Higher seed.

==== Group B ====
Pos	Team	Pld	W	L	PF	PA	PD	Qualification	(Czech Republic)	(Germany)	(Netherlands)	(Andorra)	(Sri Lanka)
1	Czech Republic	4	4	0	66	37	+29	Qualification to knockout stage	—	14–10	11–10	20–8	21–9
2	Germany	4	2	2	67	59	+8	Qualification to knockout stage	10–14	—	16–13	20–21	21–11
3	Netherlands	4	2	2	65	35	+30		10–11	13–16	—	20–5	22–3
4	Andorra	4	2	2	46	68	−22		8–20	21–20	5–20	—	12–8
5	Sri Lanka	4	0	4	31	76	−45		9–21	11–21	3–22	8–12	—

Source: FIBA
Rules for classification: 1) Wins; 2) Head-to-Head record; 3) Points scored; 4) Higher seed.

==== Group C ====
Pos	Team	Pld	W	L	PF	PA	PD	Qualification	(Russia)	(China)	(Italy)	(Argentina)	(Venezuela)
1	Russia	4	3	1	62	48	+14	Qualification to knockout stage	—	17–12	13–14	13–8	19–14
2	China	4	3	1	58	56	+2	Qualification to knockout stage	12–17	—	12–7	16–15	18–17
3	Italy	4	3	1	51	50	+1		14–13	7–12	—	17–15	13–10
4	Argentina	4	1	3	57	64	−7		8–13	15–16	15–17	—	19–18
5	Venezuela	4	0	4	59	69	−10		14–19	17–18	10–13	18–19	—

Source: FIBA
Rules for classification: 1) Wins; 2) Head-to-Head record; 3) Points scored; 4) Higher seed.

==== Group D ====
Pos	Team	Pld	W	L	PF	PA	PD	Qualification	(Spain)	(France)	(Kazakhstan)	(Egypt)	(Singapore)
1	Spain	4	4	0	71	21	+50	Qualification to knockout stage	—	9–8	19–17	21–2	22–4
2	France	4	3	1	67	33	+34	Qualification to knockout stage	8–9	—	17–10	21–11	21–3
3	Kazakhstan	4	2	2	53	45	+8		17–19	10–17	—	15–6	21–3
4	Egypt	4	1	3	40	70	−30		2–21	11–21	6–15	—	21–13
5	Singapore	4	0	4	23	85	−62		4–22	3–21	3–21	13–21	—

Source: FIBA
Rules for classification: 1) Wins; 2) Head-to-Head record; 3) Points scored; 4) Higher seed.

=== Knockout stage ===
Quarter-finals
United States	18
France	14
Russia	12
Germany	9
Czech Republic	17
China	11
Spain	13
Hungary	14

Semi-finals
United States	17
Russia	10
Czech Republic	20
Hungary	19

Final
United States	21
Czech Republic	14
Bronze Final
Russia	12
Hungary	8

=== Final standings ===
Pos	Team	Pld	W	L	PF
1	United States	7	7	0	129
2	Czech Republic	7	6	1	117
3	Russia	7	5	2	96
4	Hungary	7	3	4	95
5	Spain	5	4	1	84
6	France	5	3	2	81
7	China	5	3	2	69
8	Germany	5	2	3	76
9	Italy	4	3	1	51
10	Netherlands	4	2	2	65
11	Australia	4	2	2	54
12	Kazakhstan	4	2	2	53
13	Japan	4	2	2	53
14	Andorra	4	2	2	46
15	Argentina	4	1	3	57
16	Egypt	4	1	3	40
17	Venezuela	4	0	4	59
18	Switzerland	4	0	4	44
19	Sri Lanka	4	0	4	31
20	Singapore	4	0	4	28
