= 2022 FIBA 3x3 U18 World Cup – Women's tournament =

Basketball competition in Hungary

Tournament details
- Host country: Hungary
- City: Debrecen
- Dates: 23–28 August
- Teams: 20

Final positions
- Champions: United States (6th title)
- Runners-up: Germany
- Third place: Spain
- Fourth place: France

Tournament statistics
- MVP: (United States) Mikaylah Williams

The 2021 FIBA 3x3 U18 World Cup – Women's tournament is the ninth edition of this competition. The event was held in Debrecen, Hungary. It was contested by 20 teams.

United States won their fourth successive title with a win against Germany in the final.

== Host selection ==
Hungarian city, Debrecen, was given the hosting rights for the second time in a row.

== Teams ==
Africa

- Egypt

Americas

- Brazil
- Chile
- Mexico
- United States

Asia and Oceania

- Japan
- Kyrgyzstan
- Mongolia
- New Zealand
- Uzbekistan

Europe

- France
- Germany
- (United Kingdom) Great Britain
- Hungary (hosts)
- Latvia
- Netherlands
- Poland
- Romania
- Spain
- Ukraine

== Seeding ==
The seeding and groups were as follows:

Pool A	Pool B	Pool C	Pool D
Germany (1); Poland (8); Romania (9); New Zealand (16); Spain (17)	Uzbekistan (2); France (7); Mexico (10); Netherlands (15); Hungary (18) (H)	Brazil (3); Chile (6); Japan (11); Latvia (14) (United Kingdom) Great Britain (19)	Ukraine (4); Egypt (5); Mongolia (12); Kyrgyzstan (13); United States (20)

== Preliminary round ==
=== Pool A ===
Pos	Team	Pld	W	L	PF	PA	PD	Qualification	(Spain)	(Germany)	(Romania)	(New Zealand)	(Poland)
1	Spain	4	4	0	78	44	+34	Quarterfinals		14–13	21–13		
2	Germany	4	3	1	66	46	+20	Quarterfinals				17–12	21–13
3	Romania	4	2	2	62	55	+7			7–15		21–5	
4	New Zealand	4	1	3	49	71	−22		11–21				21–12
5	Poland	4	0	4	46	85	−39		7–22		14–21		

Source: FIBA
Rules for classification: 1) Wins; 2) Head-to-head record; 3) Points scored.

=== Pool B ===
Pos	Team	Pld	W	L	PF	PA	PD	Qualification	(France)	(Netherlands)	(Hungary)	(Mexico)	(Uzbekistan)
1	France	4	4	0	71	41	+30	Quarterfinals			14–8	18–10	
2	Netherlands	4	3	1	68	40	+28	Quarterfinals	16–18		16–11		
3	Hungary (H)	4	2	2	62	54	+8					21–15	22–9
4	Mexico	4	1	3	50	58	−8			4–14			21–5
5	Uzbekistan	4	0	4	28	86	−58		7–21	7–22			

Source: FIBA
Rules for classification: 1) Wins; 2) Head-to-head record; 3) Points scored.
(H) Hosts

=== Pool C ===
Pos	Team	Pld	W	L	PF	PA	PD	Qualification	(Japan)	(Brazil)	(Chile)	(Latvia)	(United Kingdom)
1	Japan	4	4	0	80	47	+33	Quarterfinals		19–18		21–8	
2	Brazil	4	2 (Note: Brazil 17–11 Chile)	2	64	54	+10	Quarterfinals			17–11	21–11	
3	Chile	4	2	2	61	54	+7		10–19				22–6
4	Latvia	4	1 (Note: Latvia 18–15 Great Britain)	3	49	75	−26				12–18		18–15
5	(United Kingdom) Great Britain	4	1	3	45	69	−24		11–21	13–8			

Source: FIBA
Rules for classification: 1) Wins; 2) Head-to-head record; 3) Points scored.

=== Pool D ===
Pos	Team	Pld	W	L	PF	PA	PD	Qualification	(United States)	(Ukraine)	(Egypt)	(Mongolia)	(Kyrgyzstan)
1	United States	4	4	0	79	34	+45	Quarterfinals		21–12		21–10	
2	Ukraine	4	3	1	69	50	+19	Quarterfinals			18–12		21–0
3	Egypt	4	2	2	62	53	+9		8–16			21–17	
4	Mongolia	4	1	3	65	68	−3			17–18			21–8
5	Kyrgyzstan	4	0	4	14	84	−70		4–21		2–21		

Source: FIBA
Rules for classification: 1) Wins; 2) Head-to-head record; 3) Points scored.

== Knockout stage ==
All times are local.

Quarter-finals
27 Aug 2022 – 11:30
Spain	20
Brazil	6
27 Aug 2022 – 09:40
United States	21
Netherlands	15
27 Aug 2022 – 10:05
France	12
Ukraine	10
27 Aug 2022 – 11:55
Japan	12
Germany	14

Semi-finals
28 Aug 2022 – 18:15
Spain	13
United States	21
28 Aug 2022 – 18:35
France	16
Germany	18

Final
28 Aug 2022 – 20:40
United States	21
Germany	11
Bronze medal
28 Aug 2022 – 19:40
Spain	16
France	14

== Final standings ==
=== Tiebreakers ===
- 1) Wins
- 2) Points scored
- 3) Seeding

Pos	Team	Pld	W	L	PF	PA	PD
1	United States	7	7	0	142	73	+69
2	Germany	7	5	2	109	95	+14
3	Spain	7	6	1	127	85	+42
4	France	7	5	2	113	85	+28
5	Japan	5	4	1	92	61	+31
6	Netherlands	5	3	2	83	61	+22
7	Ukraine	5	3	2	79	62	+17
8	Brazil	5	2	3	70	74	–4
9	Egypt	4	2	2	62	53	+9
10	Romania	4	2	2	62	55	+7
11	Hungary	4	2	2	62	54	+8
12	Chile	4	2	2	61	54	+7
13	Mongolia	4	1	3	65	68	–3
14	Mexico	4	1	3	50	58	–8
15	Latvia	4	1	3	49	75	–26
16	New Zealand	4	1	3	49	71	–22
17	(United Kingdom) Great Britain	4	1	3	45	69	–24
18	Poland	4	0	4	46	85	–39
19	Uzbekistan	4	0	4	28	86	–58
20	Kyrgyzstan	4	0	4	14	84	–70

== Awards ==
These players were given the awards after the competition:

=== Most valuable player ===
- (United States) Mikaylah Williams

=== Top scorer ===
- (United States) Mikaylah Williams (59 points)

=== Team of the tournament ===
- (United States) Mikaylah Williams
- (Germany) Lina Falk
- (Spain) Alicia Flórez

== See also ==
- 2022 FIBA 3x3 World Cup – Men's tournament
- 2022 FIBA 3x3 World Cup – Women's tournament
- 2022 FIBA 3x3 AmeriCup – Men's tournament
- 2022 FIBA 3x3 AmeriCup – Women's tournament
- 2022 FIBA 3x3 U18 World Cup – Men's tournament
- 2022 FIBA 3x3 Africa Cup
- 2022 FIBA 3x3 U17 Africa Cup – Men's tournament
- 2022 FIBA 3x3 U17 Africa Cup – Women's tournament
- 2022 FIBA 3x3 Asia Cup
- 2022 FIBA 3x3 Europe Cup
