= Big East Conference Women's Basketball Defensive Player of the Year =

- Awarded for: the top women's basketball defensive player in the Big East Conference
- Country: United States

History
- First award: 1997
- Most recent: Sarah Strong, UConn

The Big East Conference Women's Basketball Defensive Player of the Year is an annual college basketball award presented to the top women's basketball defensive player in the Big East Conference.

Five players have won the award more than once. Nykesha Sales of UConn, Devereaux Peters of Notre Dame, and Nika Mühl have won twice, and Ruth Riley of Notre Dame and Essence Carson of Rutgers won three times. The award was shared three times. It was given to Jacqui Grant and Aaliyah Lewis in 2017, Olivia Nelson-Ododa and Selena Lott in 2021, and Christina Dalce and Kelsey Ransom in 2024.

UConn have the most winners with seven.

== Key ==
†	Co-Player of the Year
C	Coaches selection
M	Media selection

== Winners ==
Season	Player	School	Source(s)
1996–97	Nykesha Sales	UConn	
1997–98	Nykesha Sales (2)	UConn	
1998–99	Ruth Riley	Notre Dame	
1999–00	Ruth Riley (2)	Notre Dame	
2000–01	Ruth Riley (3)	Notre Dame	
2001–02	Meghan Saake	Miami (FL)	
2002–03	Ashley Battle	UConn	
2003–04	Rebekkah Brunson	Georgetown	
2004–05	Chelsea Newton	Rutgers	
2005–06	Essence Carson	Rutgers	
2006–07	Essence Carson (2)	Rutgers	
2007–08	Essence Carson (3)	Rutgers	
2008–09	Angel McCoughtry	Louisville	
2009–10	Sarah Miles	West Virginia	
2010–11	Devereaux Peters	Notre Dame	
2011–12	Devereaux Peters (2)	Notre Dame	
2012–13	Kelly Faris	UConn	
2013–14	Liz Stratman	Butler	
2014–15	Daisha Simmons	Seton Hall	
2015–16	Aliyyah Handford	St. John's	
2016–17	Jacqui Grant †	DePaul	
2016–17	Aaliyah Lewis †	St. John's	
2017–18	Dionna White	Georgetown	
2018–19	Michelle Weaver	Butler	
2019–20	Chante Stonewall	DePaul	
2020–21	Olivia Nelson-Ododa †	UConn	
2020–21	Selena Lott †	Marquette	
2021–22	Nika Mühl	UConn	
2022–23	Nika Mühl (2)	UConn	
2023–24	Christina Dalce †	Villanova	
2023–24	Kelsey Ransom †	Georgetown	
2024–25	Lashae Dwyer	St. John's	
2025–26	Sarah Strong	UConn	

== Winners by school ==
School (year joined)	Winners	Years
UConn (1979–2013, 2020–present) (Note: Following the split of the original Big East, Cincinnati, Louisville, Rutgers, South Florida, and UConn all remained in the football-sponsoring portion that became the American Athletic Conference.) (Note: UConn joined the current Big East in 2020.)	8	1997, 1998, 2003, 2013, 2021, 2022, 2023, 2026
Notre Dame (1995–2013) (Note: Notre Dame, Pitt, and Syracuse all left for the Atlantic Coast Conference after the 2012–13 season.)	5	1999, 2000, 2001, 2011, 2012
Rutgers (1995–2013)	4	2005, 2006, 2007, 2008
DePaul (2005–present)	2	2017, 2019
Georgetown (1979–present)	2	2004, 2024
St. John's (1979–present)	2	2016, 2025
Butler (2013–present)	1	2018
Louisville (2005–2013)	1	2009
Marquette (2005–present)	1	2021
Miami (1991–2004) (Note: Miami and Virginia Tech left for the ACC in 2004.)	1	2002
Seton Hall (1979–present)	1	2015
Villanova (1980–present)	1	2024
West Virginia (1995–2012) (Note: West Virginia left for the Big 12 Conference in 2012.)	1	2010
Boston College (1979–2005) (Note: Boston College left for the ACC in 2005.)	0	—
Providence (1979–present)	0	—
Creighton (2013–present)	0	—
Pittsburgh (1982–2013)	0	—
Syracuse (1979–2013)	0	—
Cincinnati (2005–2013)	0	—
USF (2005–2013)	0	—
Virginia Tech (2000–2004)	0	—
Xavier (2013–present)	0	—
