= 2019 FIBA 3x3 U18 World Cup – Women's tournament =

Basketball competition in Mongolia

Tournament details
- Host country: Mongolia
- City: Ulaanbaatar
- Dates: 3–7 June
- Teams: 20

Final positions
- Champions: United States (4th title)
- Runners-up: New Zealand
- Third place: France
- Fourth place: China

Tournament statistics
- MVP: (United States) Hailey Van Lith

The 2019 FIBA 3x3 U18 World Cup – Women's tournament is the seventh edition of this championship. The event was held in Ulaanbaatar, Mongolia. It was contested by 20 teams.

United States won their fourth title with a win against New Zealand in the final.

== Host selection ==
Mongolia's capital, Ulaanbaatar, was given the hosting rights on 31 October 2018. This marks the first time that Mongolia is hosting a world championship in a team sport.

== Teams ==
FIBA announced the qualified teams on 20 December 2018.

Africa

- Egypt

Americas

- Mexico
- United States

Asia and Oceania

- China
- Indonesia
- Japan
- Mongolia (hosts)
- New Zealand
- Philippines
- Sri Lanka

Europe

- Belgium
- Czech Republic
- France
- Hungary
- Netherlands
- Poland
- Romania
- Russia
- Switzerland
- Ukraine

== Seeding ==
The pools were announced on 6 March 2019. The seeding and groups were as follows:

Pool A	Pool B	Pool C	Pool D
China (1); Sri Lanka (8); Ukraine (9); Mexico (16); Egypt (17)	Russia (2); Hungary (7); New Zealand (10); United States (15); Poland (18)	France (3); Netherlands (6); Mongolia (11) (H); Philippines (14); Czech Republic (19)	Indonesia (4); Romania (5); Switzerland (12); Japan (13); Belgium (20)

== Preliminary round ==
=== Pool A ===
Pos	Team	Pld	W	L	PF	PA	PD	Qualification	(China)	(Mexico)	(Ukraine)	(Egypt)	(Sri Lanka)
1	China	4	4	0	80	31	+49	Quarterfinals		17–9			21–5
2	Mexico	4	3	1	58	50	+8	Quarterfinals				22–13	13–9
3	Ukraine	4	2	2	59	48	+11		9–21	11–14			
4	Egypt	4	1	3	48	67	−19		8–21		9–17		
5	Sri Lanka	4	0	4	25	74	−49				4–22	7–18	

Source: FIBA
Rules for classification: 1) Wins; 2) Head-to-head record; 3) Points scored.

=== Pool B ===
Pos	Team	Pld	W	L	PF	PA	PD	Qualification	(United States)	(New Zealand)	(Hungary)	(Russia)	(Poland)
1	United States	4	4	0	81	32	+49	Quarterfinals			21–3		21–10
2	New Zealand	4	3	1	62	45	+17	Quarterfinals	11–20			14–12	
3	Hungary	4	2	2	37	60	−23			9–16			11–10
4	Russia	4	1	3	47	55	−8		8–19		13–14 OT		
5	Poland	4	0	4	32	67	−35			4–21		8–14	

Source: FIBA
Rules for classification: 1) Wins; 2) Head-to-head record; 3) Points scored.

=== Pool C ===
Pos	Team	Pld	W	L	PF	PA	PD	Qualification	(France)	(Philippines)	(Czech Republic)	(Mongolia)	(Netherlands)
1	France	4	4	0	72	25	+47	Quarterfinals		22–2			15–2
2	Philippines	4	3	1	47	59	−12	Quarterfinals			15–14 OT		10–9
3	Czech Republic	4	1	3	49	59	−10		12–17			14–13	
4	Mongolia	4	1	3	47	62	−15		9–18	14–20			
5	Netherlands	4	1	3	35	45	−10				14–9	10–11	

Source: FIBA
Rules for classification: 1) Wins; 2) Head-to-head record; 3) Points scored.

=== Pool D ===
Pos	Team	Pld	W	L	PF	PA	PD	Qualification	(Japan)	(Indonesia)	(Switzerland)	(Belgium)	(Romania)
1	Japan	4	4	0	65	35	+30	Quarterfinals				15–9	21–7
2	Indonesia	4	3	1	57	54	+3	Quarterfinals	11–15				16–12
3	Switzerland	4	2	2	54	45	+9		8–14	13–15 OT			
4	Belgium	4	1	3	51	54	−3			14–15	10–15		
5	Romania	4	0	4	34	73	−39				6–18	9–18	

Source: FIBA
Rules for classification: 1) Wins; 2) Head-to-head record; 3) Points scored.

== Knockout stage ==
All times are local.

Quarter-finals
7 June – 13:50
China	21
Philippines	12
7 June – 14:15
Japan	12
New Zealand	14 OT
7 June – 16:00
United States	16
Indonesia	10
7 June – 16:25
France	16
Mexico	9

Semi-finals
7 June – 17:55
China	15
New Zealand	21
7 June – 18:15
United States	21
France	11

Final
7 June – 20:15
New Zealand	13
United States	19
Bronze medal
7 June – 19:20
China	13
France	15

== Final standings ==
=== Tiebreakers ===
- 1) Wins
- 2) Points scored
- 3) Seeding

Pos	Team	Pld	W	L	PF	PA	PD
1	United States	7	7	0	137	66	+71
2	New Zealand	7	5	2	110	91	+19
3	France	7	6	1	114	68	+46
4	China	7	5	2	129	79	+50
5	Japan	5	4	1	77	49	+28
6	Indonesia	5	3	2	67	70	–3
7	Mexico	5	3	2	67	66	+1
8	Philippines	5	3	2	59	80	–21
9	Ukraine	4	2	2	59	48	+11
10	Switzerland	4	2	2	54	45	+9
11	Hungary	4	2	2	37	60	–23
12	Belgium	4	1	3	51	54	–3
13	Czech Republic	4	1	3	49	59	–10
14	Egypt	4	1	3	48	67	–19
15	Russia	4	1	3	47	55	–8
16	Mongolia	4	1	3	47	62	–15
17	Netherlands	4	1	3	35	45	–10
18	Romania	4	0	4	34	63	–39
19	Poland	4	0	4	32	67	–35
20	Sri Lanka	4	0	4	25	74	–49

== Awards ==
These players were given the awards after the competition:

=== Most valuable player ===
- (United States) Hailey Van Lith

=== Top scorer ===
45 points

- (China) Zhouze He
- (New Zealand) Charlisse Leger-Walker
- (China) Xianglin Wu

=== Team of the tournament ===
- (United States) Hailey Van Lith
- (New Zealand) Charlisse Leger-Walker
- (United States) Rickea Jackson

== See also ==
- 2019 FIBA 3x3 World Cup – Men's tournament
- 2019 FIBA 3x3 World Cup – Women's tournament
- 2019 FIBA 3x3 U18 World Cup – Men's tournament
- 2019 FIBA 3x3 Africa Cup
- 2019 FIBA 3x3 U18 Africa Cup
- 2019 FIBA 3x3 Asia Cup
- 2019 FIBA 3x3 Europe Cup
- 2019 FIBA 3x3 U18 Europe Cup – Men's tournament
