= North Carolina Miss Basketball =

North Carolina basketball award

The North Carolina Miss Basketball honor recognizes the top girls’ high school senior basketball player in the state of North Carolina. The award is presented annually by the Charlotte Observer.

== Award winners ==
Year	Player	High School	College	WNBA draft
1985	Jill Goldberg	Broughton	Vanderbilt	
1986	Schonna Banner	West Caldwell	South Carolina	
1987	Andrea Stinson	North Mecklenburg	NC State	1997 WNBA draft : Initial player allocation, 2nd overall by the Charlotte Sting
1988	Mitzi Yount	Bandys	Appalachian State	
1989	Danyel Parker	Clinton	NC State	
1990	Tonya Sampson	Clinton	North Carolina	
1991	Christy Cagle	Hayesville	Georgia	
1992	Wendy Palmer	Person	Virginia	1997 WNBA draft : Elite Draft 2nd Rnd, 9th overall by the Utah Starzz
1993	Konecka Drakeford	Providence Day School	Virginia	
1994	Tiffani Johnson	Garinger	Tennessee	
1995	Natasha Davis	Freedom	North Carolina	
1996	Shea Ralph	Sanford	Connecticut	2001 WNBA draft : 3rd Rnd, 40th overall by the Utah Starzz
1997	Tynesha Lewis	Southwest Edgecombe	NC State	2001 WNBA draft : 2nd Rnd, 31st overall by the Houston Comets
1998	Tina McKiver	East Duplin	East Carolina; Tulane	
1999	Amy Simpson	Morehead	NC State	
2000	Chrystal Baptist	Charlotte Christian	North Carolina	
2001	Natasha Brackett	Providence Day School	Auburn	
2002	Kerri Gardin	Freedom	Virginia Tech	2006 WNBA draft : 3rd Rnd, 34th overall by the Chicago Sky
2003	Camille Little	Carver	North Carolina	2007 WNBA draft : 2nd Rnd, 17th overall by the San Antonio Silver Stars
2004	Chante Black	East Forsyth	Duke	2009 WNBA draft : 1st Rnd, 10th overall by the Connecticut Sun
2005	Rashanda McCants	Asheville	North Carolina	2009 WNBA draft : 2nd Rnd, 15th overall by the Minnesota Lynx
2006	Joy Cheek	South Mecklenburg	Duke	2010 WNBA draft : 3rd Rnd, 35th overall by the Indiana Fever
2007	Cetera DeGraffenreid	Smoky Mountain	North Carolina	
2008	Candace Wood	Victory Christian	North Carolina	
2009	Christal Caldwell	West Charlotte	Florida	
2010	Shannon Smith	Forestview	North Carolina	
2011	Cierra Burdick	Butler	Tennessee	2015 NBA draft : 1st Rnd, 14th overall by the Los Angeles Sparks
2012	Tiffany Mitchell	Providence Day School	South Carolina	2016 WNBA draft : 1st Rnd, 9th overall by the Indiana Fever
2013	Keri Fulp	East Surry	Wake Forest	
2014	Jatarie White	Providence Day School	South Carolina; Texas	
2015	Stephanie Watts	Weddington	North Carolina; USC	2021 WNBA draft : 1st Rnd, 10th overall by the Los Angeles Sparks
2016	Erin Whalen	Providence Day School	Vanderbilt	
2017	Mikayla Boykin	Clinton	Duke; UNC Charlotte	
2018	Izabella Nicoletti	Neuse Christian Academy	Florida State	
2019	Nia Daniel	Hickory Ridge	North Carolina	
2020	Chyna Cornwell	Newtown-Conover	Rutgers	
2021	Saniya Rivers	Ashley	NC State	
2022	Indya Nivar	Apex Friendship	Stanford	
2023	Sarah Strong	Grace Christian School	UConn	
2024	Sarah Strong	Grace Christian School	UConn	

=== Schools with multiple winners ===
School	Number of Awards	Years
Providence Day School	5	1993, 2001, 2012, 2014, 2016
Clinton	3	1989, 1990, 2017
Freedom	2	1995, 2002

== See also ==
- North Carolina Mr. Basketball
