= Azzi Fudd =

American basketball player (born 2002)

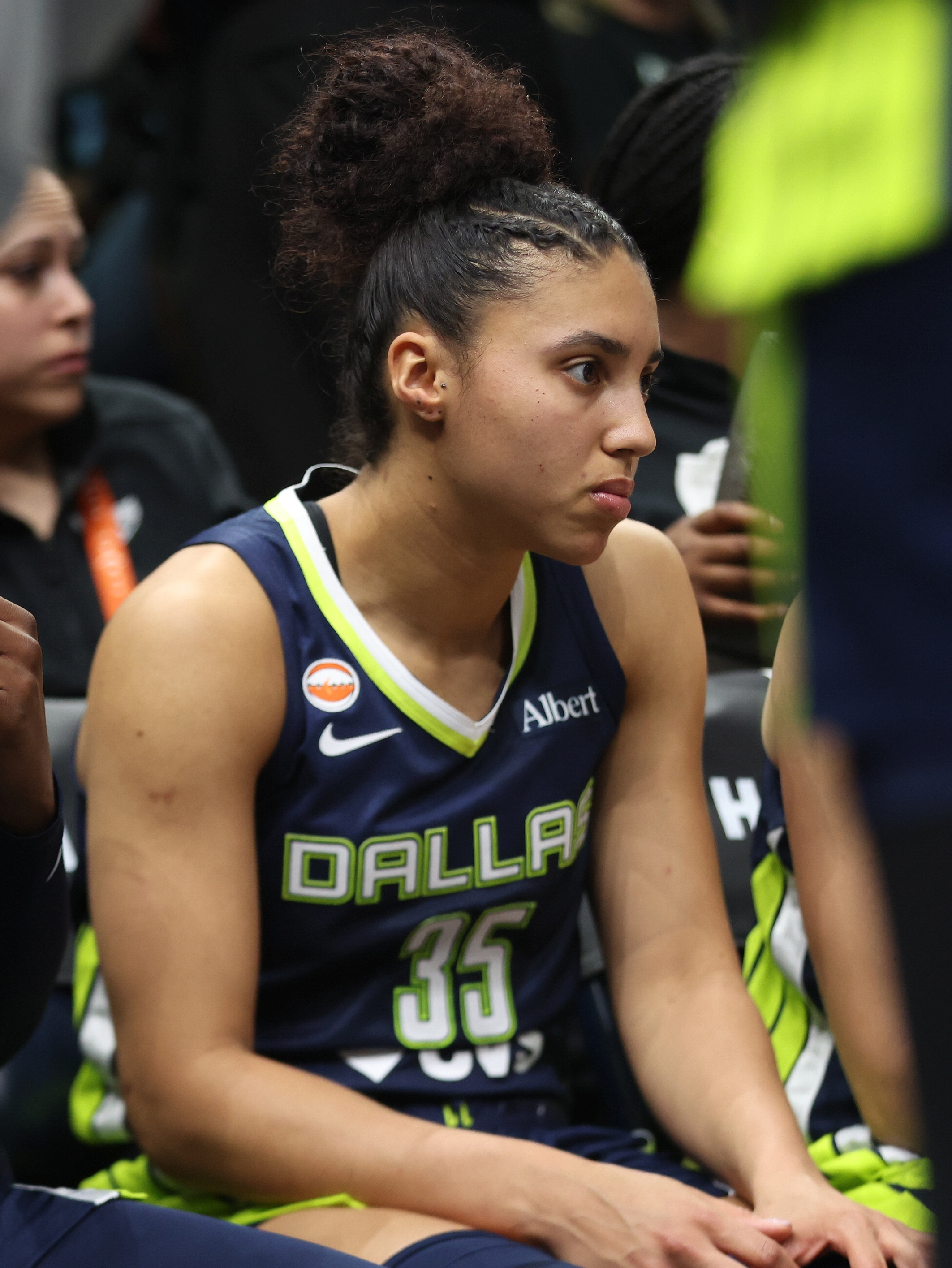
- Fudd with the Dallas Wings in 2026

No. 35 – Dallas Wings
- Position: Shooting guard
- League: WNBA

Personal information
- Born: November 11, 2002 (age 24) Fairfax, Virginia, U.S.
- Listed height: 5 ft 11 in (1.80 m)

Career information
- High school: St. John's College (Washington, D.C.)
- College: UConn (2021–2026)
- WNBA draft: 2026: 1st round, 1st overall pick
- Drafted by: Dallas Wings
- Playing career: 2026–present

Career history
- 2026–present: Dallas Wings

Career highlights
- WNBA All-Rookie Team (2026); WNBA Three-Point Contest champion (2026); NCAA champion (2025); NCAA Tournament MOP (2025); All-American – WBCA (2026); First-team All-American – AP, USBWA (2026); Big East Scholar-Athlete of the Year (2026); Women's Basketball Academic All-American of the Year (2026); 2× First-team All-Big East (2025, 2026); Big East All-Freshman Team (2022); Morgan Wootten Player of the Year (2021); McDonald's All-American (2021); Gatorade National Player of the Year (2019); USA Today All-USA Player of the Year (2019); MaxPreps National Player of the Year (2019)
- Stats at WNBA.com
- Stats at Basketball Reference
Medals
Women's basketball
Representing the United States
FIBA Under-19 World Cup
Gold medal – first place	2021 Hungary	Team
FIBA Under-17 World Cup
Gold medal – first place	2018 Belarus	Team
FIBA Americas Under-16 Championship
Gold medal – first place	2017 Argentina	Team

Azzi Jazlyn Fudd (/ˈeɪziː/ AY-zee; born November 11, 2002) is an American professional basketball player for the Dallas Wings of the Women's National Basketball Association (WNBA). She played college basketball for the UConn Huskies.

Nicknamed "the People's Princess", Fudd attended St. John's College High School in Washington, D.C., where she was the first sophomore to win Gatorade National Player of the Year. Ranked the number one recruit in her class by ESPN, she committed to UConn, whom she helped reach the national title game as a freshman in 2022. Fudd missed most of her sophomore and junior seasons with knee injuries. As a redshirt junior in 2025, she won the national championship and was named Final Four Most Outstanding Player. She earned first-team All-American honors in her senior season.

Fudd was selected as the first overall pick of the 2026 WNBA draft by the Dallas Wings. She has won three gold medals with the United States at the youth international level, including at the 2021 FIBA Under-19 World Cup and the 2018 FIBA Under-17 World Cup.

== High school career ==
In 2019, Fudd was named the Gatorade National Girls Basketball Player of the Year after putting up averages of 26.3 points, 6.2 rebounds and 2.5 assists per game, becoming the first sophomore ever to win the award. She led her team to a 35–1 record and captured the District of Columbia State Athletic Association (DCSAA) tournament title.

Prior to her sophomore year, Fudd became one of the first girls ever to attend the SC30 Select Camp, an elite offseason training camp run by two-time NBA MVP Stephen Curry, and won the camp's three-point shooting competition. Shortly after that season, while playing in the final of the U.S. under-18 3x3 championships, held to determine the country's representatives to that year's FIBA U18 3x3 World Cup, she tore the ACL and MCL in her right knee. Because of the nature of her injury, her knee reconstruction required two separate surgeries.

While still undergoing rehabilitation, Fudd attended Curry's camp again. Her doctor allowed her to compete in the camp's three-point contest again, but only if she could walk between the spots. Nonetheless, Fudd again won the contest.

Fudd returned to the St. John's team in January 2020, averaging 19.2 points, 3.5 rebounds and 2.0 assists for St. John's while still recovering from her injury before her season was prematurely halted by COVID-19. St. John's did not play an official schedule in 2020–21 for the same reason; the team played some unofficial exhibitions as the D.C. Cadets, with Fudd, who was the student body vice-president at the time, personally lobbying the school's principal for this arrangement.

Fudd averaged 25.2 points, 7.1 rebounds, 3.5 assists and 3.2 steals during an abbreviated senior season.

=== Recruiting ===
Fudd was a five-star recruit and was ranked number one in the class of 2021 by ESPN. She received her first scholarship offer in sixth grade from Maryland. On November 11, 2020, Fudd announced her commitment to UConn. She chose the Huskies over offers from Maryland, UCLA, Louisville, Oregon, Kentucky, Texas, and Notre Dame. She became the 12th number-one recruit to sign with UConn since 1998 and joined former number-one recruit Paige Bueckers.

== College career ==
=== Freshman season ===
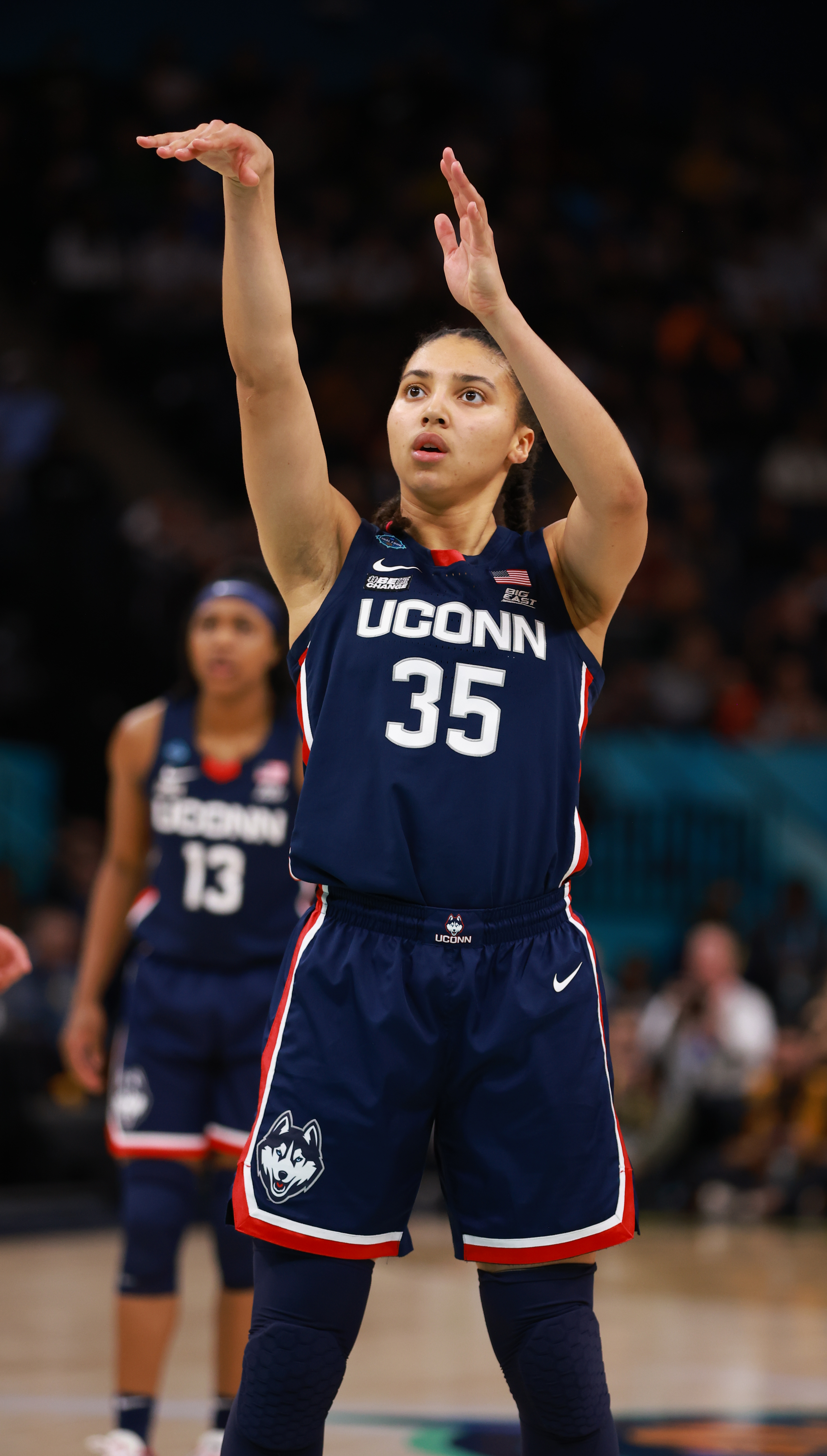
Fudd with UConn at the Final Four of the 2022 NCAA tournament

Fudd was selected Big East Preseason Freshman of the Year. On November 21, 2021, Fudd made her collegiate debut for UConn, scoring seven points, and three rebounds in a 95–80 win over Arkansas. After playing in the first four games of the season, she missed 11 games due to a foot injury. On February 6, 2022, in Fudd's first collegiate start against rival Tennessee, she finished with a career high 25 points, along with four rebounds, and four assists. The following game, Fudd finished with a season high 29 points against Villanova in a 72–69 loss.

During the Elite Eight, Fudd helped UConn in a 91-87 double-overtime victory over NC State scoring 19 points, five rebounds, and two assists, while playing a team high 49 minutes. She and Christyn Williams were named Bridgeport All-Region Team for their performances. She finished her freshmen year averaging 12.1 points, 2.7 rebounds, and 1.0 assists.

=== Sophomore season ===
Fudd made her season debut on November 10, 2022, recording 26 points and 4 assists in a 98–39 win against Northeastern. On November 14, Fudd scored a career high 32 points and four assists in an 83–76 win against number three ranked Texas. The 56 points scored by Fudd set a record for the most points ever scored by a UConn player in the first two games of the season, beating the previous record held by Diana Taurasi. The 32 points scored against Texas tied a record held by Taurasi for the most points scored by a UConn player against a top-five opponent. On December 4, against rival Notre Dame, Fudd suffered a right knee injury after a teammate fell on her knee. Fudd was expected to miss three to six weeks. On January 11, 2023, Fudd returned for the Huskies against St. John's after missing the previous eight games. She came off the bench, scored 15 points, and only played 20 minutes due to minutes restrictions. Fudd missed more time after re-injuring her right knee against Georgetown, one game after she had returned from a 5-week absence from the initial injury. During Fudd's absence, UConn lost two consecutive games for the first time since March 1993 and suffered multiple losses to unranked conference opponents for the first time since 2003–04. After missing 14 games, Fudd made her return in the Huskies' 69–39 Big East tournament quarterfinal win over Georgetown, scoring 10 points in 17 minutes. Despite Fudd's return, the Huskies fell short to Ohio State in the Sweet Sixteen. Fudd finished her sophomore season averaging 15.1 points, 1.9 rebounds, and 1.9 assists per game.

=== Redshirt season ===
Fudd made her season debut on November 8, 2023, notching 13 points, 3 rebounds, and 3 assists in a 102–58 win against Dayton. On November 22, 2023, it was announced that Fudd had torn her right ACL and meniscus while practicing, ending her season.

=== Junior season ===
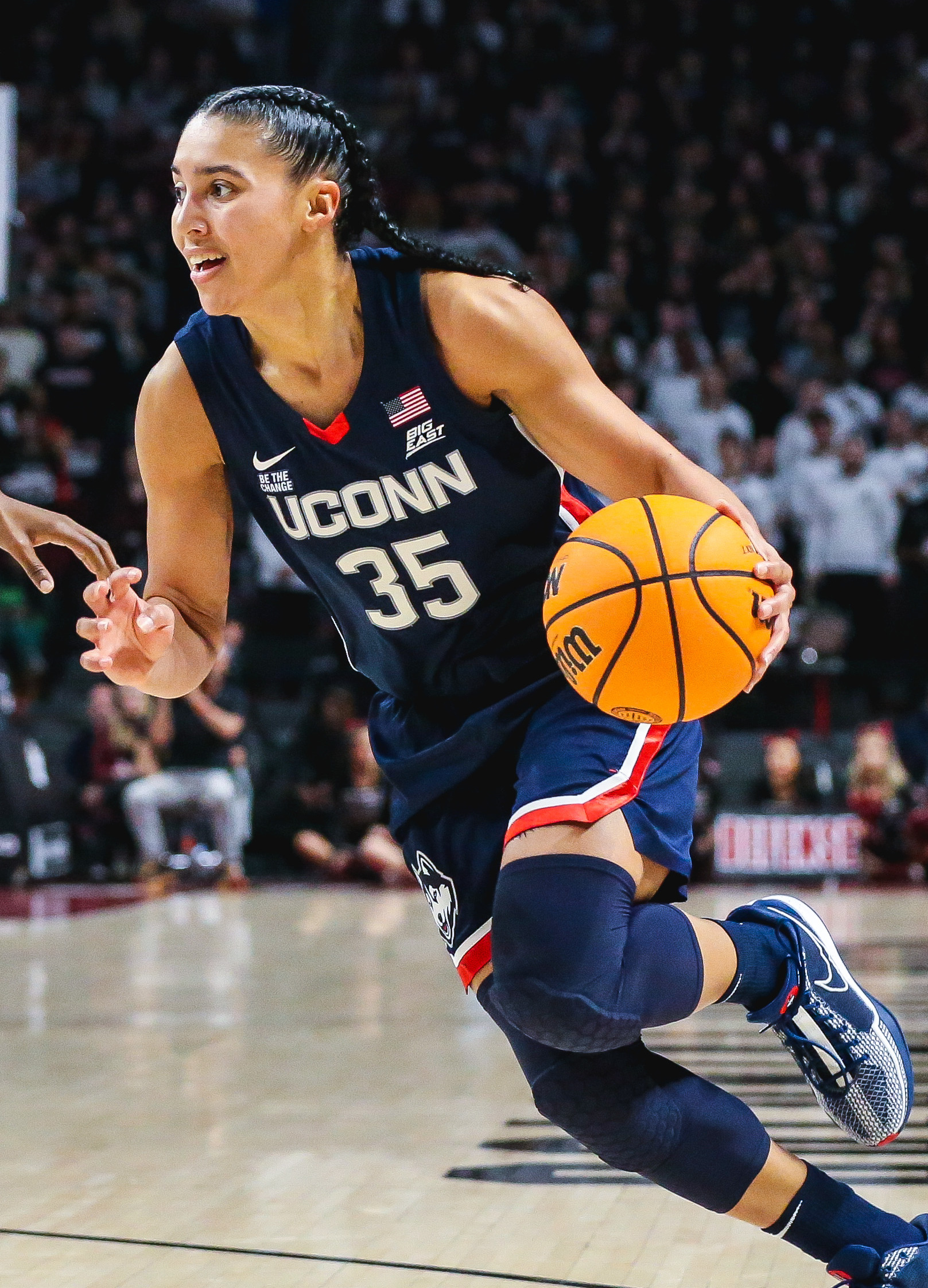
Fudd with UConn in 2025

After missing the first 3 games due to her ACL injury, Fudd made her season debut on November 20, 2024, in an 85–41 win against FDU. She finished the night scoring four points with one steal and one rebound in a limited 12 minutes. On February 12, 2025, Fudd scored a career-high 34 points against St John's in a 78–40 win. She also become the eighth player in program history to score eight three pointers in a game.

At the end of the 2025 regular season, Fudd was named to the All-Big East First Team, along with teammates Paige Bueckers and Sarah Strong. On March 25, 2025, she announced she would be returning to UConn for her final season despite being eligible for the WNBA draft. On April 6, 2025, Fudd won her first national championship scoring 24 points, and 5 rebounds and also winning Most Outstanding Player honors for her performance. She finished her junior season averaging 13.6 points, 2.0 rebounds, and 1.8 assists.

=== Senior season ===
Before the start of her senior season, Fudd was unanimously named to the preseason All-Big East Team. Fudd made her season debut on November 4, 2025, recording 20 points, 2 rebounds, and 3 assists in a 79–66 win over No. 20 Louisville. On November 21, Fudd led the Huskies with 31 points in a 72–69 win against No. 6 Michigan. On November 23, Fudd recorded 24 points and a career-high 8 rebounds in a 94–41 win over Utah. On February 1, Fudd recorded 27 points, 7 rebounds, 4 steals, and a season high 7 assists in a 96-66 win against No. 15 Tennessee. Fudd was named Big East Scholar Athlete of the Year and was selected to the All-Big East regular season and tournament teams. Additionally, Fudd was named a USBWA and AP first team All-American.. Fudd finished her Senior season averaging 17.3 points, 2.6 rebounds, 2.5 steals (against 0.8 pf) and 3.1 assists per game.

== Professional career ==
=== WNBA ===
==== Dallas Wings (2026–present) ====
On April 13, 2026, the Dallas Wings selected Fudd as the first overall pick of the 2026 WNBA draft, signing her to the most lucrative rookie contract in the league's history ($500,000) as a result of the March 2026 collective bargaining agreement. On May 9, she made her 2026 season debut, recording 3 points and 1 rebound in a 107–104 victory over the Indiana Fever. On May 24, Fudd recorded 24 points, 2 rebounds, 3 assists, 3 steals, and 2 blocks in a 91–76 victory over the New York Liberty; 17 of those 24 points were scored in the third quarter, tying the second-highest single-quarter scoring total by a rookie in WNBA history. In addition, she set the WNBA rookie record for the most three-pointers made in a single quarter (5) and the Wings rookie record for the most three-pointers made in a single game (6). On May 28, Fudd made her first start and recorded 22 points, three rebounds, and two assists in a 95–87 victory over the Las Vegas Aces. On August 19, it was announced that Fudd would require surgery on her knee and miss the remainder of the season.

=== Project B ===
On June 19, 2026, Fudd joined Project B, a new global basketball league that plan to launch its first season from December through April 2027.

== National team career ==
She has represented the United States internationally, winning gold medals at the 2017 FIBA Under-16 Women's Americas Championship in Argentina, the 2018 FIBA Under-17 Women's Basketball World Cup in Belarus and 2021 FIBA Under-19 Women's Basketball World Cup in Hungary.

== Career statistics ==
Legend
GP	Games played	GS	Games started	MPG	Minutes per game	RPG	Rebounds per game
APG	Assists per game	SPG	Steals per game	BPG	Blocks per game	PPG	Points per game
TO	Turnovers per game	FG%	Field-goal percentage	3P%	3-point field-goal percentage	FT%	Free-throw percentage
**Bold**	Career best	°	League leader

*	Denotes seasons in which Fudd won an NCAA Championship

=== WNBA ===
WNBA regular season statistics
Year	Team	GP	GS	MPG	FG%	3P%	FT%	RPG	APG	SPG	BPG	TO	PPG
2026	Dallas	30	24	31.7	.456	.397	.826	1.7	1.8	1.7	.8	1.1	13.1
**Career**	1 year, 1 team	30	24	31.7	.456	.397	.826	1.7	1.8	1.7	.8	1.1	13.1

=== College ===
Year	Team	GP	GS	MPG	FG%	3P%	FT%	RPG	APG	SPG	BPG	TO	PPG
2021–22	UConn	25	17	27.9	.457	.430	.912	**2.7**	1.0	1.0	**.7**	**1.0**	12.1
2022–23	UConn	15	10	28.2	.456	.340	.882	1.9	1.9	1.3	.3	1.7	15.1
2023–24	UConn	2	2	**30.5**	.320	.286	**1.000**	2.5	2.5	1.0	.0	1.5	11.0
2024–25*	UConn	34	30	26.4	.474	.436	.917	2.0	1.8	1.4	.3	**1.0**	13.6
2025–26	UConn	**39**	**39**	28.7	**.481**	**.447**	.955	2.6	**3.1**	**2.5**	.5	1.5	**17.3**
**Career**		115	98	27.9	.460	.422	.925	2.3	2.1	1.7	.4	1.3	14.7
Statistics retrieved from Sports-Reference

== Personal life ==
Both of Fudd's parents were basketball players. Her mother, Katie Smrcka-Duffy Fudd, played at NC State and Georgetown before being drafted by the Sacramento Monarchs in the 2001 WNBA draft, while her father, Tim Fudd, played at American University. She has two younger brothers, Jon and Jose, whom her parents adopted in 2011, and an older brother named Thomas.

She was named after Jennifer Azzi, a player whom her mother admired. Fudd donned the 1996 Olympic gold medalist's No. 8 jersey number in her honor as she won the 2021 FIBA U19 World Cup. Fudd remarked "I started to realize I love the game and that I was actually pretty good at it. And then I started to appreciate who Jennifer Azzi was. So probably around middle school was when it really kind of hit me that I was named after an amazing person and player." The two met in 2015, with Jennifer later stating "When I heard there was a child named after me, not my first name, but my last name, which is pretty unique... that's a huge honor."

In 2025, Fudd confirmed that she was in a relationship with former UConn and current Dallas Wings teammate Paige Bueckers. The two met while competing against each other for starting point guard on the U16 USA Basketball national team. She became teammates once more with Bueckers after being selected 1st overall in the 2026 WNBA draft.

As a guest on Azzi‘s podcast, Fudd Around and Find Out, Paige Bueckers confirmed that Fudd and Bueckers are no longer together. While the podcast episode was published November 6, 2026, Paige confirmed that her and Azzi had broken up over a year prior to this announcement and before Fudd was drafted to the Dallas Wings. Paige and Azzi remain great friends and strong teammates.

== Business interests ==
In September 2021, Fudd signed a name, image, and likeness (NIL) deal with Chipotle, as an ambassador for their "Real Food for Real Athletes" platform. In November 2021, she became an equity partner for sports drink BioSteel Sports Nutrition. In December 2021, Fudd signed with Golden State Warriors star Stephen Curry's SC30 Inc. brand for "multidimensional" partnership, which includes a sponsorship deal and personal mentoring from the four-time NBA champion. Fudd has also signed deals with Bose, Nerf, and Buick.

On July 21, 2025, Unrivaled, a 3x3 basketball league, announced the signing of 14 of the best women's college basketball players, including Fudd and her UConn teammate Sarah Strong, to groundbreaking NIL deals as part of "The Future is Unrivaled Class of 2025", building on the league's commitment to investing in and cultivating the future of the game. Fudd could play in Unrivaled as early as 2027.

On August 7, 2025, Fudd released her own podcast featuring Ashanti Plummer called “Fudd Around and Find Out”, a reference to a t-shirt Fudd's mother wore in the NCAA Tournament. The podcast is presented by iHeartRadio Women's Sports and co-produced by Steph Curry's Unanimous Media. "This podcast is a space where I can bring my full self, athlete, storyteller, budding entrepreneur, and a fan of the game, and highlight the voices that deserve to be heard," Fudd said in a press release.

On March 6, 2026, Fudd signed a multi-year NIL deal with Jordan Brand. Other recent brand deals include GEICO, Celsius, Planet Fitness, CashApp, Paula's Choice, Covergirl, and Cava.
