= Sarah Strong =

American basketball player (born 2006)

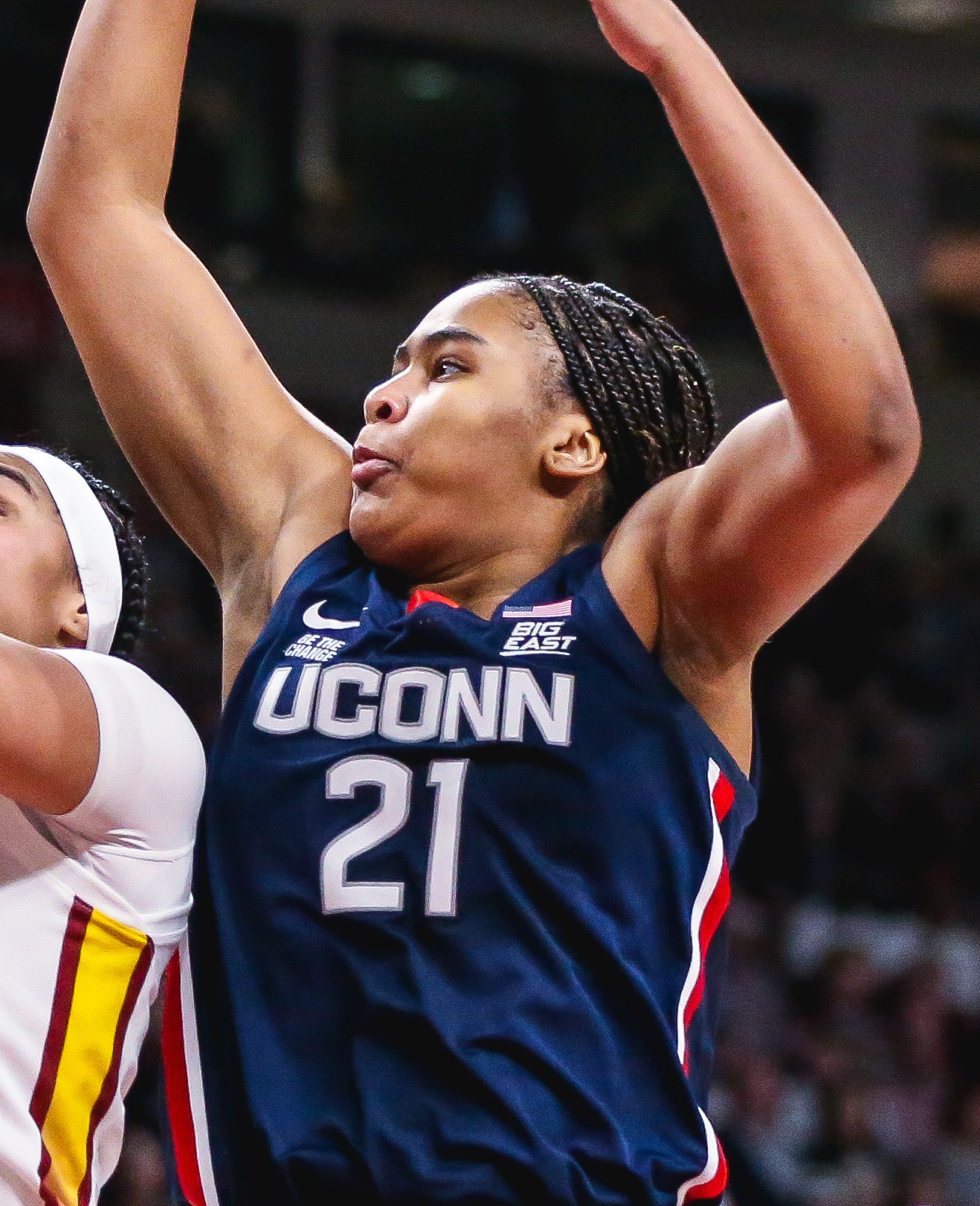
- Strong with UConn in 2025

No. 21 – UConn Huskies
- Position: Small forward
- League: Big East Conference

Personal information
- Born: February 3, 2006 (age 20) Madrid, Spain
- Listed height: 6 ft 2 in (1.88 m)

Career information
- High school: Fuquay-Varina (Fuquay-Varina, North Carolina); Grace Christian School (Sanford, North Carolina)
- College: UConn (2024–present)

Career highlights
- Wade Trophy (2026); AP Player of the Year (2026); Naismith College Player of the Year (2026); USBWA National Player of the Year (2026); 2× WBCA Coaches' All-American (2025, 2026); Katrina McClain Award (2026); First-team All-American – USBWA, AP (2026); Big East Player of the Year (2026); Big East Defensive Player of the Year (2026); Big East All-Defensive Team (2026); NCAA champion (2025); Second-team All-American – AP (2025); Third-team All-American – USBWA (2025); WBCA Freshman of the Year (2025); 2× First-team All-Big East (2025, 2026); Big East Freshman of the Year (2025); Big East All-Freshman Team (2025); FIBA 3x3 U18 Women's World Cup MVP (2024); Naismith Prep Player of the Year (2024); McDonald's All-American Game co-MVP (2024); Nike Hoop Summit (2024); 2× North Carolina Miss Basketball (2023, 2024)
Medals
Representing the United States
Women's basketball
FIBA Under-18 Women's AmeriCup
Gold medal – first place	2024 Colombia
FIBA 3x3 U18 World Cup
Gold medal – first place	2024 Hungary
Gold medal – first place	2023 Hungary
Gold medal – first place	2022 Hungary

Sarah Strong (born February 3, 2006) is an American-French college basketball player for the UConn Huskies of the Big East Conference. She was ranked the number one recruit in the 2024 class by ESPN.

== High school career ==
Strong played her freshman year at Fuquay-Varina High School in Fuquay-Varina, North Carolina, and averaged 25 points and 19 rebounds per game. After that season, she moved to Grace Christian School in Sanford, North Carolina, and won three consecutive North Carolina Independent Schools Athletic Association (NCISAA) state titles as the team went 91–4 over three years and finished on a 41-game undefeated streak. As a senior, she averaged 21.0 points, 16.8 rebounds, 4.6 assists and 2.8 steals per game in 2023–24. She was named North Carolina Miss Basketball in 2023 and 2024 and was selected to play in the 2024 McDonald's All-American Girls Game. She was named the Naismith High School Player of the Year in 2024, becoming the first North Carolinian to be so honored. Strong was ranked as the No. 1 recruit of the class of 2024 by ESPN. On April 6, 2024, she committed to play college basketball at UConn.

== College career ==
=== Freshman season ===
Strong debuted for the UConn Huskies on November 7, 2024, scoring a team-high 17 points with 4 rebounds, 3 assists, and 6 steals in a 86–32 win over Boston University.

At the end of the 2025 regular season, Strong was named Big East Freshman of the Year, and was unanimously named to the All-Big East First Team, along with teammate Paige Bueckers, and the Big East All-Freshman Team. She was also named the Division I WBCA Freshman of the Year.

On April 6, 2025, Strong won her first national championship scoring a double-double with 24 points, 15 rebounds and 5 assists, becoming the first player in history to have at least 20 points, 15 boards and 5 assists in the national championship game. She finished her freshman season averaging 16.4 points, 8.9 rebounds and 3.6 assists.

== National team career ==
In 3x3 basketball, Strong won gold with the United States at the 2022, 2023 and 2024 FIBA 3x3 U18 World Cup, and at the 2024 FIBA U18 Women's AmeriCup.

In June 2025, Strong represented USA Basketball at the 2025 FIBA 3x3 World Cup, finishing sixth after a 18-15 loss to Mongolia in the quarterfinals. In five games (4-1), Strong averaged 7.6 points (4th among all players) and 7.8 rebounds (1st).

== Off the court ==
=== Personal life ===
Strong was born on February 3, 2006, in Madrid, Spain. She spent the first 10 years of her life living with her parents in Spain and is fluent in Spanish.

Strong's father, Danny Strong, played college basketball at NC State. Strong's mother, Allison Feaster, played college basketball at Harvard, and then professionally in the WNBA. Feaster later joined the Boston Celtics front office.

Strong has dual citizenship with France.

=== Business interests ===
In April 2024, Strong signed a name, image, and likeness (NIL) deal with the collective Bleeding Blue For Good.

On July 21, 2025, Unrivaled, a 3x3 basketball league, announced the signing of 14 of the best women's college basketball players, including Strong and her UConn teammate Azzi Fudd, to groundbreaking NIL deals as part of "The Future is Unrivaled Class of 2025", building on the league's commitment to investing in and cultivating the future of the game.

== Career statistics ==
Legend
GP	Games played	GS	Games started	MPG	Minutes per game	RPG	Rebounds per game
APG	Assists per game	SPG	Steals per game	BPG	Blocks per game	PPG	Points per game
TO	Turnovers per game	FG%	Field-goal percentage	3P%	3-point field-goal percentage	FT%	Free-throw percentage
**Bold**	Career best	°	League leader

*	Denotes seasons in which Strong won an NCAA Championship

=== College ===
Year	Team	GP	GS	MPG	FG%	3P%	FT%	RPG	APG	SPG	BPG	TO	PPG
2024–25*	UConn	**40**	**40**	**28.7**	**58.6**	38.8	74.0	**8.9**	3.6	2.3	**1.7**	**1.6**	16.4
2025–26	UConn	38	37	27.4	58.2	**40.4**	**83.3**	7.7	**3.8**	**3.4**	1.6	1.9	**18.4**
**Career**		78	77	28.0	58.4	39.6	79.3	8.3	3.7	2.8	1.6	1.7	17.4
Statistics retrieved from Sports-Reference
