= Project B (basketball) =

Startup global basketball league

Project B is a startup global basketball league.

== History ==
Project B was founded in 2023 by ex-Facebook and Google executive Grady Burnett and Skype cofounder Geoff Prentice. Alana Beard will serve as the Chief Basketball Officer. Candace Parker, Steve Young, Novak Djokovic, Sloane Stephens, and Cheryl Miller are included as investors and advisors. The league hopes to appeal to an international audience.

== League format ==
Project B will have both women's and men's basketball that will include six teams that will play in a traditional five on five format. Each team's roster will have 11 players. The season will take place over seven two-week long tournaments throughout Europe, Asia and Latin America. Valencia (March 12–21, 2027) and Tokyo (March 26–April 4, 2027) are the first two confirmed host cities. The first season will begin in January 2027 and conclude in April 2027.

== Players ==
Nneka Ogwumike was the first women's basketball player to sign with Project B. As of December 2025, Alyssa Thomas, Janelle Salaün, Jewell Loyd, Jonquel Jones, Justė Jocytė, Kamilla Cardoso, Sophie Cunningham, and Kelsey Mitchell have also signed with the league. As of June 2026, additional signed players include Awa Fam, Azzi Fudd, Leonie Fiebich, Li Meng, Park Ji-hyun and Mai Yamamoto.

The men's players will be announced early July 2026.

== Controversy ==
Project B plans to pay its female players salaries over a million dollars and give them equity in the league, causing concern that the league will compete with and put pressure on other women's basketball leagues like Euroleague Women, the WNBA, Athletes Unlimited and Unrivaled.

The Saudi Wealth Fund is reported to be one of the investors, which has created concern for its association with human rights violations. However, league representatives have denied that the league is funded by Saudi Arabia, calling it an operating partner and not an investor.
