= 2024 FIBA 3x3 U18 World Cup – Women's tournament =

Basketball competition in Hungary

Tournament details
- Host country: Hungary
- City: Debrecen and Hajdú–Bihar County
- Dates: 26–30 August
- Teams: 18

Final positions
- Champions: United States (8th title)
- Runners-up: Japan
- Third place: China
- Fourth place: Germany

Tournament statistics
- MVP: (United States) Sarah Strong

The 2024 FIBA 3x3 U18 World Cup – Women's tournament is the tenth edition of this competition. For the third time, the event was held in Debrecen, and Hajdú–Bihar County, Hungary. It was contested by 18 teams.

United States won their eighth successive title with a win against Japan in the final. This is the United States' eighth title in total.

== Host selection ==
For the fourth time in a row, Hungarian city, Debrecen, and Hajdú–Bihar County was given the hosting rights.

== Teams ==
Africa

- Egypt
- Morocco
- Benin (withdrew)
- Uganda (withdrew)

Americas

- United States
- Mexico

Asia and Oceania

- Japan
- Thailand
- Kyrgyzstan
- Turkmenistan
- India
- New Zealand
- China

Europe

- France
- Poland
- Germany
- Ukraine
- Latvia
- Spain
- Hungary (hosts)

== Seeding ==
The seeding and groups were as follows:

Pool A	Pool B	Pool C	Pool D
Thailand (1); Ukraine (8); Mexico (9); Benin (16) (withdrew); Morocco (17)	Germany (2); France (7); Turkmenistan (10); Spain (15); Hungary (18) (H)	Kyrgyzstan (3); Japan (6); India (11); China (14); Uganda (19) (withdrew)	Poland (4); Egypt (5); Latvia (12); New Zealand (13); United States (20)

== Venue ==

Hajdú–Bihar County

== Preliminary round ==
=== Pool A ===
Pos	Team	Pld	W	L	PF	PA	PD	Qualification	(Ukraine)	(Mexico)	(Thailand)	(Morocco)	(Benin)
1	Ukraine	3	3	0	61	32	+29	Quarterfinals		18–14		22–7	Canc.
2	Mexico	3	2	1	40	40	0	Quarterfinals			15–14		Canc.
3	Thailand	3	1	2	42	41	+1		11–21			17–5	Canc.
4	Morocco	3	0	3	20	50	−30			8–11			Canc.
5	Benin	0	0	0	0	0	0	Withdrew	Canc.	Canc.	Canc.	Canc.	

Source: FIBA
Rules for classification: 1) Wins; 2) Head-to-head record; 3) Points scored.

=== Pool B ===
Pos	Team	Pld	W	L	PF	PA	PD	Qualification	(Germany)	(Spain)	(France)	(Hungary)	(Turkmenistan)
1	Germany	4	4	0	73	45	+28	Quarterfinals		12–11	20–18 OT		
2	Spain	4	3	1	70	44	+26	Quarterfinals			20–18	18–10	
3	France	4	2	2	78	53	+25					21–8	21–5
4	Hungary (H)	4	1	3	51	66	−15		12–21				21–6
5	Turkmenistan	4	0	4	19	83	−64		4–20	4–21			

Source: FIBA
Rules for classification: 1) Wins; 2) Head-to-head record; 3) Points scored.
(H) Hosts

=== Pool C ===
Pos	Team	Pld	W	L	PF	PA	PD	Qualification	(Japan)	(China)	(Kyrgyzstan)	(India)	(Uganda)
1	Japan	3	3	0	63	28	+35	Quarterfinals		21–13		21–12	Canc.
2	China	3	2	1	55	35	+20	Quarterfinals				21–11	Canc.
3	Kyrgyzstan	3	1	2	27	62	−35		3–21	3–22			Canc.
4	India	3	0	3	42	63	−21				19–21		Canc.
5	Uganda	0	0	0	0	0	0	Withdrew	Canc.	Canc.	Canc.	Canc.	

Source: FIBA
Rules for classification: 1) Wins; 2) Head-to-head record; 3) Points scored.

=== Pool D ===
Pos	Team	Pld	W	L	PF	PA	PD	Qualification	(United States)	(Poland)	(New Zealand)	(Egypt)	(Latvia)
1	United States	4	4	0	84	26	+58	Quarterfinals		21–4			21–11
2	Poland	4	3	1	62	61	+1	Quarterfinals			18–14	21–10	
3	New Zealand	4	2	2	62	58	+4		6–21			21–9	
4	Egypt	4	1	3	39	76	−37		5–21				15–13
5	Latvia	4	0	4	50	76	−26			16–19	10–21		

Source: FIBA
Rules for classification: 1) Wins; 2) Head-to-head record; 3) Points scored.

== Knockout stage ==
All times are local.

Quarter-finals
30 August 2024 – 14:40
Ukraine	16
China	20
30 August 2024 – 15:05
United States	18
Spain	12
30 August 2024 – 16:30
Germany	19
Poland	10
30 August 2024 – 16:55
Japan	14
Mexico	9

Semi-finals
30 August 2024 – 18:20
China	8
United States	21
30 August 2024 – 18:45
Germany	18
Japan	20

Final
30 August 2024 – 21:10
United States	21
Japan	19
Bronze medal
30 August 2024 – 20:10
China	21
Germany	17

== Final standings ==
=== Tiebreakers ===
- 1) Wins
- 2) Points scored
- 3) Seeding

Pos	Team	Pld	W	L	PF	PA	PD
1	United States	7	7	0	144	65	+79
2	Japan	3	3	0	63	28	+35
3	China	3	2	1	55	35	+20
4	Germany	4	4	0	73	45	+28
5	Ukraine	3	3	0	61	32	+29
6	Spain	4	3	1	70	44	+26
7	Poland	4	3	1	62	61	+1
8	Mexico	3	2	1	40	40	0
9	France	4	2	2	78	53	+25
10	New Zealand	4	2	2	62	58	+4
11	Thailand	3	1	2	42	41	+1
12	Kyrgyzstan	3	1	2	27	62	-35
13	Hungary	4	1	3	51	66	–15
14	Egypt	4	1	3	39	76	–37
15	India	3	0	3	42	63	–21
16	Latvia	4	0	4	50	76	–26
17	Morocco	3	0	3	20	50	–30
18	Turkmenistan	4	0	4	19	83	–64

== Awards ==
Team of the tournament
(United States) Sarah Strong	(Japan) Kanon Suzuki	(China) Jiaxin Wang
Most valuable player
(United States) Sarah Strong
Top scorer
(China) Jiaxin Wang (49 points)
