= Janiah Barker =

American basketball player

No. 2 – Las Vegas Aces
- Position: Forward
- League: WNBA

Personal information
- Born: November 8, 2003 (age 23) Marietta, Georgia, U.S.
- Listed height: 6 ft 4 in (1.93 m)
- Listed weight: 185 lb (84 kg)

Career information
- High school: Tampa Bay Tech (Tampa, Florida); Montverde Academy (Montverde, Florida)
- College: Texas A&M (2022–2024); UCLA (2024–2025); Tennessee (2025–2026)
- WNBA draft: 2026: 2nd round, 29th overall pick
- Drafted by: Las Vegas Aces

Career highlights
- Big Ten Sixth Player of the Year (2025); SEC All-Freshman Team (2023); McDonald's All-American (2022)
- Stats at Basketball Reference
Medals
Women's basketball
Representing the United States
FIBA AmeriCup
Silver medal – second place	2023 Mexico	Team
FIBA Americas Under-16 Championship
Gold medal – first place	2019 Chile	Team
Women's 3x3 basketball
Representing the United States
FIBA 3x3 Under-18 World Cup
Gold medal – first place	2021 Hungary	Team

Janiah Barker (born November 8, 2003) is an American basketball player for the Las Vegas Aces of the Women's National Basketball Association. She played college basketball for the Tennessee Lady Volunteers, Texas A&M Aggies and UCLA Bruins. She attended Montverde Academy in Montverde, Florida, where she was ranked the number 3 recruit in her class by ESPN. Barker was drafted by the Aces with the 14th pick in the second round (29th overall) of the 2026 WNBA draft.

== Early life and high school career ==
Barker was born in Marietta, Georgia but grew up in Tampa, Florida. Barker started her high school career Tampa Bay Technical High School in Tampa, Florida before transferring to Montverde Academy her senior year. As a freshman in 2018–19, Barker helped Tampa Bay Technical High School team to a 24–3 record and a state title. Barker led Montverde Academy (Tampa, Florida) to its first-ever GEICO High School National Championship in 2022. Barker scored eight points and grabbed a game-high 12 rebounds in the national championship game. Barker averaged 17.6 points and 8.9 rebounds during her senior campaign, while shooting 50% from the field and 35% from deep. In her senior year Barker was named in the Women's Basketball Coaches Association high school All-American team. She also played in both the McDonald's All-American Game and Jordan Brand Classic.

=== Recruiting ===
Barker was considered a five-star recruit and was ranked third in the 2022 class by ESPN. Barker committed to playing college basketball for Texas A&M Aggies over offers from Georgia Lady Bulldogs, becoming the highest ranked recruit in program history.

== College career ==
In her freshman season at Texas A&M, Barker started seven games for the Aggies, averaging 22.8 minutes a game. She put up a career-high 24 points against Georgia, shooting 10-of-11 (90.9%) from the field in 20 minutes of action after missing the previous 10 games due to injury. As a freshman, Barker averaged 12.7 points and 5.9 rebounds per match. In her sophomore season, Barker recorded eight double-doubles, averaging 12.2 points and 7.6 rebounds in 30 games played as a sophomore. Barker was named to the Winter SEC Academic Honor Roll and was on the 2023 Katrina McClain Award watchlist. For her junior season, Barker transferred to UCLA. After being on a Final Four team at UCLA, Janiah Barker, Londynn Jones, and the entire previous UCLA freshman class entered the transfer portal. Janiah went to the University of Tennessee, which had a poor 16-14 season record.

== National team career ==
Barker won a gold medal with the United States under-16 national team at the 2019 FIBA Under-16 Americas Championship in Chile. Barker played for the senior national team at the 2023 FIBA AmeriCup in Mexico, helping her team win a silver medal. Barker was also a part of the team than won the gold medal at the 2021 FIBA 3x3 U18 World Cup.

== Career statistics ==
Legend
GP	Games played	GS	Games started	MPG	Minutes per game	RPG	Rebounds per game
APG	Assists per game	SPG	Steals per game	BPG	Blocks per game	PPG	Points per game
TO	Turnovers per game	FG%	Field-goal percentage	3P%	3-point field-goal percentage	FT%	Free-throw percentage
**Bold**	Career best	°	League leader

=== College ===
Year	Team	GP	GS	MPG	FG%	3P%	FT%	RPG	APG	SPG	BPG	TO	PPG
2022–23	Texas A&M	19	7	22.7	45.6	**40.7**	58.1	5.9	0.5	1.1	**1.0**	2.5	12.7
2023–24	Texas A&M	30	**27**	**26.5**	**47.9**	34.3	63.0	**7.6**	**1.4**	**1.3**	0.7	2.7	12.2
2024–25	UCLA	**36**	3	17.5	46.5	18.2	65.3	6.0	1.4	0.6	0.5	**2.3**	7.4
2025–26	Tennessee	27	21	23.9	46.5	36.5	**73.0**	6.6	1.2	1.1	0.9	2.6	**14.3**
**Career**		112	58	22.3	46.8	33.8	65.3	6.5	1.2	1.0	0.7	2.5	11.2
Statistics retrieved from Sports-Reference.
