= 2021 FIBA 3x3 U18 World Cup – Women's tournament =

Basketball competition in Hungary

Tournament details
- Host country: Hungary
- City: Debrecen
- Dates: 24–29 August
- Teams: 17

Final positions
- Champions: United States (5th title)
- Runners-up: Spain
- Third place: Hungary
- Fourth place: Germany

Tournament statistics
- MVP: (United States) Mikaylah Williams

The 2021 FIBA 3x3 U18 World Cup – Women's tournament is the eighth edition of this competition. The event was held in Debrecen, Hungary. It was contested by 17 teams.

United States won their second successive title with a win against Spain in the final.

== Host selection ==
Hungarian city, Debrecen, was given the hosting rights.

== Teams ==
Africa

- Egypt

Americas

- United States

Asia and Oceania

- Indonesia
- Mongolia

Europe

- Belarus
- Estonia
- Germany
- Hungary (hosts)
- Israel
- Latvia
- Netherlands
- Romania
- Russia
- Slovenia
- Spain
- Switzerland
- Ukraine

== Seeding ==
The seeding and groups were as follows:

Pool A	Pool B	Pool C	Pool D
Egypt (1); Netherlands (7); Ukraine (8); Spain (14); Romania (15)	Russia (2); Belarus (6); Mongolia (9); Slovenia (13); United States (16)	Germany (3); Latvia (5); Indonesia (10); Israel (17)	Estonia (4); Hungary (11) (H); Switzerland (12)

== Preliminary round ==
=== Pool A ===
Pos	Team	Pld	W	L	PF	PA	PD	Qualification	(Spain)	(Ukraine)	(Netherlands)	(Romania)	(Egypt)
1	Spain	4	4	0	71	39	+32	Quarterfinals			18–7	16–14	
2	Ukraine	4	2 (Note: Ukraine 19–12 Netherlands)	2	56	52	+4	Quarterfinals	12–17				10–11
3	Netherlands	4	2	2	49	58	−9			12–19		14–13 OT	
4	Romania	4	1 (Note: Romania 12–11 Egypt)	3	51	56	−5			12–15			12–11
5	Egypt	4	1	3	36	58	−22		6–20		8–16		

Source: FIBA
Rules for classification: 1) Wins; 2) Head-to-head record; 3) Points scored.

=== Pool B ===
Pos	Team	Pld	W	L	PF	PA	PD	Qualification	(United States)	(Russia)	(Belarus)	(Slovenia)	(Mongolia)
1	United States	4	3	1	78	48	+30	Quarterfinals		17–20			21–8
2	Russia	4	3 (Note: Russia advances over Belarus due to their better seeding.)	1	71	60	+11	Quarterfinals			9–22	20–19	
3	Belarus	4	3	1	71	46	+25		13–19				22–10
4	Slovenia	4	1	3	52	70	−18		7–21		8–14		
5	Mongolia	4	0	4	35	83	−48			2–22		15–18	

Source: FIBA
Rules for classification: 1) Wins; 2) Head-to-head record; 3) Points scored.

=== Pool C ===
Pos	Team	Pld	W	L	PF	PA	PD	Qualification	(Germany)	(Latvia)	(Israel)	(Indonesia)
1	Germany	3	3	0	55	23	+32	Quarterfinals		16–11	20–8	
2	Latvia	3	2	1	52	33	+19	Quarterfinals			19–12	22–5
3	Israel	3	1	2	42	44	−2					22–5
4	Indonesia	3	0	3	14	63	−49		4–19			

Source: FIBA
Rules for classification: 1) Wins; 2) Head-to-head record; 3) Points scored.

=== Pool D ===
Pos	Team	Pld	W	L	PF	PA	PD	Qualification	(Hungary)	(Estonia)	(Switzerland)
1	Hungary (H)	2	2	0	34	23	+11	Quarterfinals			21–11
2	Estonia	2	1	1	29	17	+12	Quarterfinals	12–13		17–4
3	Switzerland	2	0	2	15	38	−23				

Source: FIBA
Rules for classification: 1) Wins; 2) Head-to-head record; 3) Points scored.
(H) Hosts

== Knockout stage ==
All times are local.

Quarter-finals
28 Aug 2021 – 11:30
Spain	21
Latvia	11
28 Aug 2021 – 10:05
Hungary	21
Russia	18
28 Aug 2021 – 10:30
United States	18
Estonia	4
28 Aug 2021 – 11:05
Germany	13
Ukraine	10

Semi-finals
29 Aug 2021 – 12:55
Spain	15
Hungary	11
29 Aug 2021 – 13:20
United States	15
Germany	14

Final
29 Aug 2021 – 20:05
Spain	14
United States	21
Bronze medal
29 Aug 2021 – 14:40
Hungary	19
Germany	13

== Final standings ==
=== Tiebreakers ===
- 1) Wins
- 2) Points scored
- 3) Seeding

Pos	Team	Pld	W	L	PF	PA	PD
1	United States	7	6	1	132	80	+52
2	Spain	7	6	1	121	82	+39
3	Hungary	5	4	1	85	69	+16
4	Germany	6	4	2	95	67	+28
5	Russia	5	3	2	89	81	+9
6	Latvia	4	2	2	63	54	+9
7	Ukraine	5	3	2	66	65	+1
8	Estonia	3	1	2	33	35	–2
9	Belarus	4	3	1	71	46	+25
10	Netherlands	4	2	2	49	58	–9
11	Israel	3	1	2	42	44	–2
12	Slovenia	4	1	3	52	70	–18
13	Romania	4	1	3	51	56	–5
14	Egypt	4	1	3	36	58	–22
15	Mongolia	4	0	4	35	83	–48
16	Switzerland	2	0	2	15	38	–23
17	Indonesia	3	0	3	14	63	–49

== Awards ==
These players were given the awards after the competition:

=== Most valuable player ===
- (United States) Mikaylah Williams

=== Top scorer ===
- (United States) Mikaylah Williams (56 points)

=== Team of the tournament ===
- (United States) Mikaylah Williams
- (Spain) Elena Buenavida
- (Hungary) Zita Szabo

== See also ==
- 2021 FIBA 3x3 U18 World Cup – Men's tournament
- 2021 FIBA 3x3 AmeriCup
- 2021 FIBA 3x3 Europe Cup
