= 2023 FIBA 3x3 U18 World Cup – Women's tournament =

Basketball competition in Hungary

Tournament details
- Host country: Hungary
- City: Debrecen
- Dates: 29 August–3 September
- Teams: 19

Final positions
- Champions: United States (7th title)
- Runners-up: France
- Third place: Japan
- Fourth place: Lithuania

Tournament statistics
- MVP: (United States) Mikaylah Williams

The 2023 FIBA 3x3 U18 World Cup – Women's tournament is the tenth edition of this competition. For the third time, the event was held in Debrecen, Hungary. It was contested by 19 teams.

United States won their fifth successive title with a win against Spain in the final. This is the United States' seventh title in total.

== Host selection ==
For the third time in a row, Hungarian city, Debrecen, was given the hosting rights.

== Teams ==
Africa

- (Democratic Republic of the Congo) Congo DR (withdrew)
- Egypt
- Morocco
- Tunisia

Americas

- Brazil
- Chile
- United States

Asia and Oceania

- Chinese Taipei
- Japan
- Malaysia
- Mongolia
- Thailand

Europe

- France
- Germany
- Hungary (hosts)
- Latvia
- Lithuania
- Poland
- Spain
- Ukraine

== Seeding ==
The seeding and groups were as follows:

| Pool A | Pool B | Pool C | Pool D |
|---|---|---|---|
| Egypt (1); Chile (8); Latvia (14) (Democratic Republic of the Congo) Congo DR (16) (withdrew); Tunisia (17) | Germany (2); France (7); Brazil (9); United States (15); Hungary (18) (H) | Ukraine (3); Japan (6); Lithuania (10); Spain (13); Morocco (19) | Thailand (4); Poland (5); Mongolia (11); Malaysia (12); Chinese Taipei (20) |

== Preliminary round ==
=== Pool A ===
| Pos | Team | Pld | W | L | PF | PA | PD | Qualification | (Egypt) | (Latvia) | (Chile) | (Tunisia) | (Democratic Republic of the Congo) |
|---|---|---|---|---|---|---|---|---|---|---|---|---|---|
| 1 | Egypt | 3 | 2 (Note: Egypt 21–8 Latvia) | 1 | 52 | 31 | +21 | Quarterfinals | | | 21–11 | | Canc. |
| 2 | Latvia | 3 | 2 | 1 | 49 | 51 | −2 | Quarterfinals | 8–21 | | | | Canc. |
| 3 | Chile | 3 | 1 (Note: Chile 21–8 Tunisia) | 2 | 49 | 51 | −2 | | | 17–22 | | 21–8 | Canc. |
| 4 | Tunisia | 3 | 1 | 2 | 33 | 50 | −17 | | 12–10 OT | 13–19 | | | Canc. |
| 5 | (Democratic Republic of the Congo) Congo DR | 0 | 0 | 0 | 0 | 0 | 0 | Withdrew | Canc. | Canc. | Canc. | Canc. | |

Source: FIBA
Rules for classification: 1) Wins; 2) Head-to-head record; 3) Points scored.

=== Pool B ===
| Pos | Team | Pld | W | L | PF | PA | PD | Qualification | (United States) | (France) | (Germany) | (Hungary) | (Brazil) |
|---|---|---|---|---|---|---|---|---|---|---|---|---|---|
| 1 | United States | 4 | 4 | 0 | 82 | 49 | +33 | Quarterfinals | | 21–12 | | 21–16 | |
| 2 | France | 4 | 3 | 1 | 75 | 54 | +21 | Quarterfinals | | | | 21–8 | 21–6 |
| 3 | Germany | 4 | 2 | 2 | 63 | 60 | +3 | | 10–19 | 19–21 | | | |
| 4 | Hungary (H) | 4 | 1 | 3 | 48 | 68 | −20 | | | | 7–13 | | 17–13 |
| 5 | Brazil | 4 | 0 | 4 | 43 | 80 | −37 | | 11–21 | | 13–21 | | |

Source: FIBA
Rules for classification: 1) Wins; 2) Head-to-head record; 3) Points scored.
(H) Hosts

=== Pool C ===
| Pos | Team | Pld | W | L | PF | PA | PD | Qualification | (Japan) | (Lithuania) | (Spain) | (Ukraine) | (Morocco) |
|---|---|---|---|---|---|---|---|---|---|---|---|---|---|
| 1 | Japan | 4 | 4 | 0 | 75 | 40 | +35 | Quarterfinals | | 21–12 | | | 21–5 |
| 2 | Lithuania | 4 | 3 | 1 | 72 | 62 | +10 | Quarterfinals | | | 19–13 | 19–18 OT | |
| 3 | Spain | 4 | 2 | 2 | 58 | 46 | +12 | | 9–15 | | | | 21–4 |
| 4 | Ukraine | 4 | 1 | 3 | 62 | 63 | −1 | | 14–18 | | 8–15 | | |
| 5 | Morocco | 4 | 0 | 4 | 30 | 86 | −56 | | | 10–22 | | 11–22 | |

Source: FIBA
Rules for classification: 1) Wins; 2) Head-to-head record; 3) Points scored.

=== Pool D ===
| Pos | Team | Pld | W | L | PF | PA | PD | Qualification | (Poland) | (Mongolia) | (Chinese Taipei) | (Thailand) | (Malaysia) |
|---|---|---|---|---|---|---|---|---|---|---|---|---|---|
| 1 | Poland | 4 | 4 | 0 | 75 | 48 | +27 | Quarterfinals | | 12–11 | 22–18 | | |
| 2 | Mongolia | 4 | 3 | 1 | 62 | 52 | +10 | Quarterfinals | | | | 21–15 | 14–11 |
| 3 | Chinese Taipei | 4 | 2 | 2 | 74 | 68 | +6 | | | 14–16 | | 21–20 | |
| 4 | Thailand | 4 | 1 | 3 | 64 | 70 | −6 | | 10–21 | | | | 19–7 |
| 5 | Malaysia | 4 | 0 | 4 | 37 | 74 | −37 | | 9–20 | | 10–21 | | |

Source: FIBA
Rules for classification: 1) Wins; 2) Head-to-head record; 3) Points scored.

== Knockout stage ==
All times are local.

Quarter-finals
3 Sep 2023 – 10:00
Egypt | 13
Lithuania | 16
3 Sep 2023 – 10:25
Poland | 19
France | 20 OT
3 Sep 2023 – 11:50
United States | 21
Mongolia | 16
3 Sep 2023 – 12:15
Japan | 17 OT
Latvia | 15

Semi-finals
3 Sep 2023 – 13:40
Lithuania | 15
France | 21
3 Sep 2023 – 14:05
United States | 15
Germany | 14

Final
3 Sep 2023 – 20:10
France | 16
United States | 22
Bronze medal
3 Sep 2023 – 19:10
Lithuania | 11
Japan | 21

== Final standings ==
=== Tiebreakers ===
- 1) Wins
- 2) Points scored
- 3) Seeding

| Pos | Team | Pld | W | L | PF | PA | PD |
|---|---|---|---|---|---|---|---|
| 1 | United States | 7 | 7 | 0 | 146 | 101 | +45 |
| 2 | France | 7 | 5 | 2 | 132 | 110 | +22 |
| 3 | Japan | 7 | 6 | 1 | 133 | 87 | +46 |
| 4 | Lithuania | 7 | 4 | 3 | 114 | 117 | –3 |
| 5 | Poland | 5 | 4 | 1 | 94 | 68 | +26 |
| 6 | Egypt | 4 | 2 | 2 | 65 | 47 | +18 |
| 7 | Latvia | 4 | 2 | 2 | 64 | 68 | –4 |
| 8 | Mongolia | 5 | 3 | 2 | 78 | 73 | +5 |
| 9 | Chinese Taipei | 4 | 2 | 2 | 74 | 68 | +6 |
| 10 | Chile | 3 | 1 | 2 | 49 | 51 | –2 |
| 11 | Germany | 4 | 2 | 2 | 63 | 60 | +3 |
| 12 | Spain | 4 | 2 | 2 | 58 | 46 | +12 |
| 13 | Tunisia | 3 | 1 | 2 | 33 | 50 | –17 |
| 14 | Thailand | 4 | 1 | 3 | 64 | 70 | –6 |
| 15 | Ukraine | 4 | 1 | 3 | 62 | 63 | –1 |
| 16 | Hungary | 3 | 1 | 2 | 48 | 68 | –20 |
| 17 | Brazil | 4 | 0 | 4 | 43 | 80 | –37 |
| 18 | Malaysia | 4 | 0 | 4 | 37 | 74 | –37 |
| 19 | Morocco | 4 | 0 | 4 | 30 | 86 | –56 |

== Awards ==
These players were given the awards after the competition. For the third time, Mikaylah Williams won MVP.

=== Most valuable player ===
- (United States) Mikaylah Williams

=== Top scorer ===
- (United States) Mikaylah Williams (54 points)

=== Team of the tournament ===
- (United States) Mikaylah Williams
- (France) Charlotte Abraham
- (Japan) Maho Mitsugi

== See also ==
- 2023 FIBA 3x3 World Cup – Men's tournament
- 2023 FIBA 3x3 World Cup – Women's tournament
- 2023 FIBA 3x3 AmeriCup – Men's tournament
- 2023 FIBA 3x3 AmeriCup – Women's tournament
- 2023 FIBA 3x3 U18 World Cup – Men's tournament
- 2023 FIBA 3x3 Africa Cup – Men's tournament
- 2023 FIBA 3x3 Africa Cup – Women's tournament
- 2023 FIBA 3x3 U17 Africa Cup – Men's tournament
- 2023 FIBA 3x3 U17 Africa Cup – Women's tournament
- 2023 FIBA 3x3 Asia Cup
- 2023 FIBA 3x3 Europe Cup
