= 2022 FIBA 3x3 U17 Africa Cup – Women's tournament =

Basketball competition in Egypt

Tournament details
- Host country: Egypt
- City: Cairo
- Dates: December 1–2
- Teams: 5

Final positions
- Champions: Egypt (1st title)
- Runners-up: DR Congo
- Third place: Morocco
- Fourth place: Zambia

Tournament statistics
- MVP: (Egypt) Maya Sayed

The 2022 FIBA 3x3 U17 Africa Cup – Women's tournament is the second edition of this continental championship. The event was held in Cairo, Egypt. It was contested by 5 teams. Starting this edition, the age group changed from U18 to U17.

Mali are the defending champions, but didn't enter this time round. Egypt won their first title with a win over Congo DR in the final.

== Host selection ==
Egypt's capital, Cairo, was given the hosting rights on 31 May 2022.

== Participating teams ==
All African National Federations were invited to register a team for the 2022 FIBA 3x3 U17 Africa Cup.

Pool A

- Egypt (1)
- Algeria (4) (withdrew)
- Kenya (5) (withdrew)
- Zambia (8)

Pool B

- (Democratic Republic of the Congo) Congo DR (2)
- Benin (3)
- Morocco (6)
- Rwanda (7) (withdrew)

== Preliminary round ==
The pools were announced on October 3, 2022.

=== Pool A ===
Pos	Team	Pld	W	L	PF	PA	PD	Qualification	(Egypt)	(Zambia)	(Algeria)	(Kenya)
1	Egypt (H)	1	1	0	20	5	+15	Semi-finals		20–5	Canc.	Canc.
2	Zambia	1	0	1	5	20	−15	Quarter-finals	5–20		Canc.	Canc.
3	Algeria	0	0	0	0	0	0	Withdrew	Canc.	Canc.		Canc.
4	Kenya	0	0	0	0	0	0	Withdrew	Canc.	Canc.	Canc.	

Source: FIBA
Rules for classification: 1) Wins; 2) Head-to-head record; 3) Points scored.
(H) Hosts

=== Pool B ===
Pos	Team	Pld	W	L	PF	PA	PD	Qualification	(Democratic Republic of the Congo)	(Morocco)	(Benin)	(Rwanda)
1	(Democratic Republic of the Congo) Congo DR	2	2	0	30	17	+13	Semi-finals			15–5	Canc.
2	Morocco	2	1	1	27	24	+3	Quarter-finals	12–15			Canc.
3	Benin	2	0	2	14	30	−16	Quarter-finals		9–15		Canc.
4	Rwanda	0	0	0	0	0	0	Withdrew	Canc.	Canc.	Canc.	

Source: FIBA
Rules for classification: 1) Wins; 2) Head-to-head record; 3) Points scored.

== Knockout stage ==
All times are local.

Quarter-finals
2 Dec 2022 – 15:00
Zambia	8
Benin	2

Semi-finals
2 Dec 2022 – 16:25
Egypt	18
Morocco	11
2 Dec 2022 – 16:50
(Democratic Republic of the Congo) Congo DR	15
Zambia	5

Final
2 Dec 2022 – 19:05
Egypt	21
(Democratic Republic of the Congo) Congo DR	3
Bronze medal
2 Dec 2022 – 18:15
Morocco	12
Zambia	10

== Final standings ==
Pos	Team	Pld	W	L	PF	PA	PD
1	Egypt	3	3	0	59	19	+40
2	(Democratic Republic of the Congo) Congo DR	4	3	1	48	43	+5
3	Morocco	4	2	2	50	52	–2
4	Zambia	4	1	3	28	49	–21
5	Benin	3	0	3	16	38	–22

== Awards ==
These players were given the awards after the competition:

=== Most valuable player ===
- (Egypt) Maya Sayed

=== Top scorer ===
- (Democratic Republic of the Congo) Charly Mbambo (22 points)

=== Team of the tournament ===
- (Egypt) Maya Sayed
- (Democratic Republic of the Congo) Charly Mbambo
- (Morocco) Aya Elkalali

== See also ==
- 2022 FIBA 3x3 U17 Africa Cup – Men's tournament
- 2022 FIBA 3x3 World Cup – Men's tournament
- 2022 FIBA 3x3 World Cup – Women's tournament
- 2022 FIBA 3x3 Africa Cup
- 2022 FIBA 3x3 Asia Cup
- 2022 FIBA 3x3 AmeriCup
- 2022 FIBA 3x3 Europe Cup
