= 3x3 Basketball at the 2018 Summer Youth Olympics – Girls' tournament =

Tournament details
- Host country: Argentina
- City: Buenos Aires
- Dates: 7–17 October
- Teams: 20

Final positions
- Champions: United States (2nd title)
- Runners-up: France
- Third place: Australia
- Fourth place: China

The girls' tournament in 3x3 basketball at the 2018 Summer Youth Olympics was held from 7 to 17 October 2018 at the Parque Mujeres Argentinas in Buenos Aires.

== Preliminary rounds ==
All times are given in Central European Time.

=== Group A ===
Pos	Team	Pld	W	L	PF	PA	PD	Pts
1	Hungary	4	4	0	84	32	+52	8
2	China	4	3	1	64	60	+4	7
3	Germany	4	2	2	58	63	−5	6
4	Romania	4	1	3	58	71	−13	5
5	Iran	4	0	4	36	74	−38	4

7 October
15:00

Hungary	22–0	Iran

7 October
15:30

Romania	16–18	Germany

7 October
17:00

China	13–21	Hungary

7 October
17:30

Iran	14–18	Romania

7 October
18:30

China	18–12	Germany

11 October
15:00

Germany	19–9	Iran

11 October
15:30

Romania	14–18	China

11 October
17:00

Germany	9–20	Hungary

11 October
17:30

Iran	13–15	China

11 October
19:00

Hungary	21–10	Romania

=== Group B ===
Pos	Team	Pld	W	L	PF	PA	PD	Pts
1	United States	4	4	0	84	30	+54	8
2	Ukraine	4	3	1	70	44	+26	7
3	Venezuela	4	1	3	56	69	−13	5
4	Sri Lanka	4	1	3	41	75	−34	5
5	Egypt	4	1	3	41	74	−33	5

8 October
15:00

Venezuela	9–21	USA

8 October
15:30

Sri Lanka	17–15	Egypt

8 October
17:00

Ukraine	22–11	Venezuela

8 October
17:30

USA	21–8	Sri Lanka

8 October
18:30

Ukraine	21–6	Egypt

12 October
15:00

Sri Lanka	6–18	Ukraine

12 October
15:30

Egypt	4–21	USA

12 October
17:00

Venezuela	21–10	Sri Lanka

12 October
17:30

USA	21–9	Ukraine

12 October
19:00

Egypt	16–15	Venezuela

=== Group C ===
Pos	Team	Pld	W	L	PF	PA	PD	Pts
1	Argentina	4	4	0	80	44	+36	8
2	France	4	3	1	71	45	+26	7
3	Mexico	4	2	2	61	56	+5	6
4	Indonesia	4	1	3	53	75	−22	5
5	Andorra	4	0	4	34	79	−45	4

9 October
15:00

Indonesia	14–17	Mexico

9 October
15:30

Andorra	7–21	France

9 October
17:00

Argentina	21–11	Indonesia

9 October
17:30

Andorra	7–21	Mexico

9 October
18:30

France	13–18	Argentina

13 October
15:00

Indonesia	16–15	Andorra

13 October
15:30

Mexico	8–15	France

13 October
17:00

Mexico	15–20	Argentina

13 October
17:30

France	22–12	Indonesia

13 October
19:00

Argentina	21–5	Andorra

=== Group D ===
Pos	Team	Pld	W	L	PF	PA	PD	Pts
1	Australia	4	3	1	52	45	+7	7
2	Netherlands	4	3	1	59	45	+14	7
3	Spain	4	2	2	58	48	+10	6
4	Estonia	4	1	3	55	77	−22	5
5	Czech Republic	4	1	3	52	61	−9	5

10 October
15:00

Netherlands	7–11	Australia

10 October
15:30

Czech Republic	16–13	Spain

10 October
17:00

Estonia	12–22	Netherlands

10 October
17:30

Australia	15–11	Czech Republic

10 October
18:30

Estonia	11–21	Spain

14 October
15:00

Czech Republic	15–17	Estonia

14 October
15:30

Spain	12–7	Australia

14 October
17:00

Netherlands	16–10	Czech Republic

14 October
17:30

Australia	19–15	Estonia

14 October
19:00

Spain	12–14	Netherlands

== Knockout round ==
Quarterfinals; 16 October
Hungary	12
France	13
Australia	16
Ukraine	6
United States	18
Netherlands	14
Argentina	17
China	19

Semifinals; 17 October
France	20
Australia	19
United States	21
China	9

Final; 17 October
France	4
United States	18
Bronze Medal Match; 17 October
Australia	18
China	13

== Final standings ==
Pos.	Country	Athletes
1st place, gold medalist(s)	United States	Paige Bueckers; Hailey Van Lith; Samantha Brunelle; Aliyah Boston
2nd place, silver medalist(s)	France	Diaba Konate; Mathilde Peyregne; Eve de Christophie Mahoutou; Olivia Yale
3rd place, bronze medalist(s)	Australia	Alexandra Fowler; Ruby Porter; Sara-Rose Smith; Suzi-Rose Deegan
