= Mikaylah Williams =

American basketball player (born 2005)

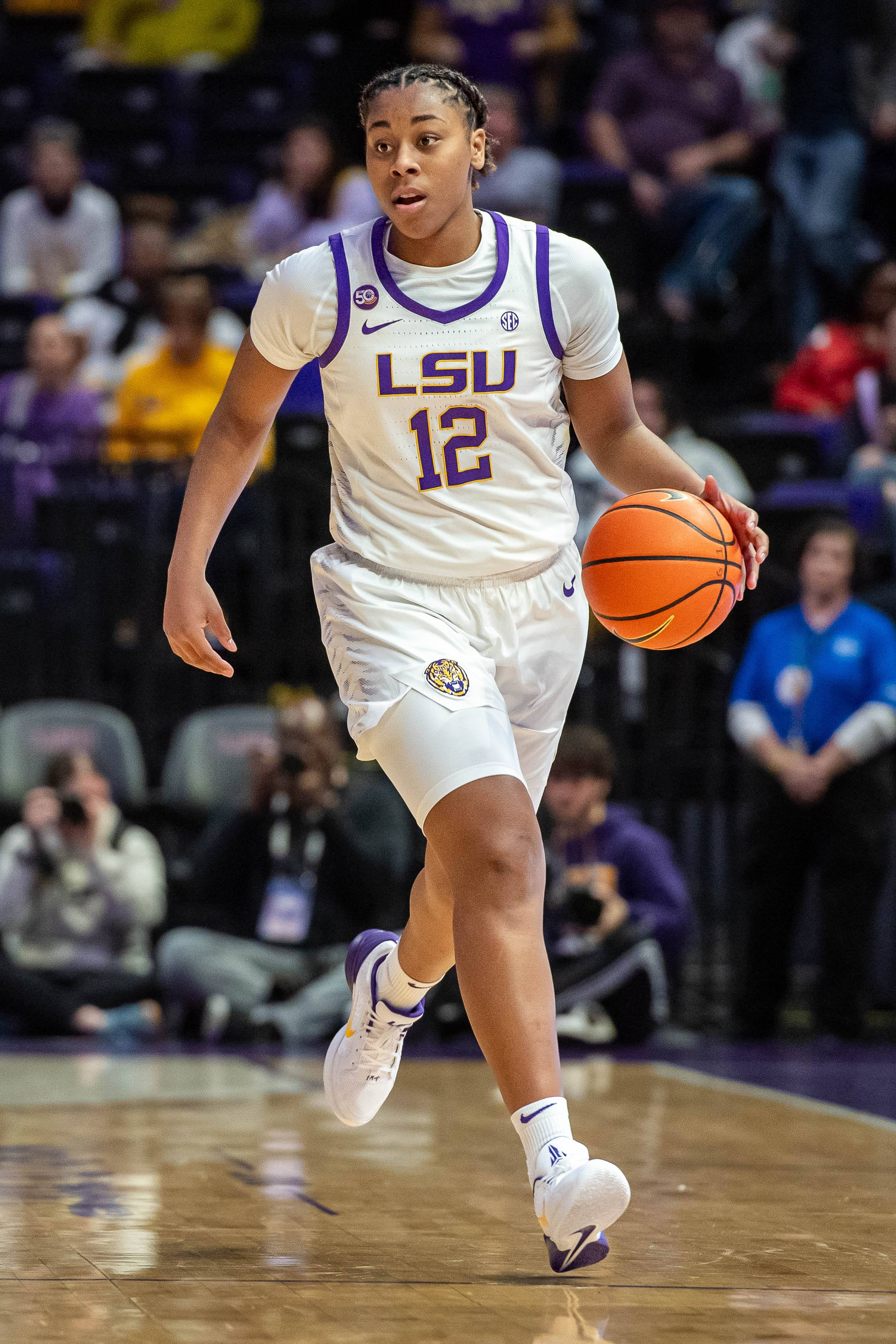
- Williams with LSU in 2025

No. 12 – LSU Tigers
- Position: Point guard / shooting guard
- League: Southeastern Conference

Personal information
- Born: July 8, 2005 (age 21)
- Listed height: 6 ft 0 in (1.83 m)

Career information
- High school: Parkway (Bossier City, Louisiana)
- College: LSU (2023–present)

Career highlights
- 2× First-team All-SEC (2025, 2026); SEC Freshman of the Year (2024); SEC All-Freshman Team (2024); Morgan Wootten National Player of the Year (2023); McDonald's All-American (2023); Nike Hoop Summit (2023); 2× Louisiana Miss Basketball (2022, 2023); 3× FIBA 3x3 U18 World Cup MVP (2021–2023); USA Basketball 3x3 Athlete of the Year (2022); USA Basketball 3x3 Female Athlete of the Year (2023) (Note: Until 2022, USA Basketball named a single 3x3 Athlete of the Year. Since 2023, USA Basketball names both 3x3 Female and Male Athlete of the Year.)
Medals
Women's basketball
Representing the United States
FIBA Under-17 World Cup
Gold medal – first place	2022 Hungary	Team
Women's 3x3 basketball
Representing the United States
FIBA 3x3 World Cup
Gold medal – first place	2026 Warsaw	Team
FIBA 3x3 U18 World Cup
Gold medal – first place	2023 Hungary	Team
Gold medal – first place	2022 Hungary	Team
Gold medal – first place	2021 Hungary	Team

Mikaylah Williams (born July 8, 2005) is an American college basketball player for the LSU Tigers of the Southeastern Conference (SEC).

== High school career ==
Williams played basketball for Parkway High School in Bossier City, Louisiana. She also competed in softball and track and field during high school. In her junior basketball season, she earned Louisiana Miss Basketball and Louisiana Gatorade Player of the Year honors after helping her team reach the Class 5A state title game. As a senior, Williams led Parkway to the non-select Division I state championship, leaving as the school's all-time leading scorer. She was named Morgan Wootten National Player of the Year and repeated as Louisiana Miss Basketball and Louisiana Gatorade Player of the Year. Williams played in the McDonald's All-American Game and the Nike Hoop Summit.

=== Recruiting ===
In middle school, Williams committed to play college softball for Louisiana and received basketball scholarship offers from LSU, Ole Miss and Arkansas. By the end of high school, she was considered a five-star recruit and the number two player in her class by ESPN. On June 24, 2022, Williams committed to play college basketball for LSU over offers from Ole Miss, Baylor, Duke and Texas A&M.

== College career ==
On November 6, 2023, Williams made her debut for LSU, scoring 17 points in a 92–78 loss to Colorado. On November 14, she scored 42 points, breaking the program single-game freshman record, in a 109–79 win over Kent State. It was the highest-scoring performance by an LSU player since Cornelia Gayden in 1996. At the end of the regular season, Williams was named the SEC Freshman of the Year and into the SEC All-Freshman Team.

As a sophomore, Williams started 37 games, and averaged 17.3 points and 4.5 rebounds. She led the team assists, with a total of 124 in the season. On March 7, 2025, Williams had a career-high 8 assists against Florida in the SEC Tournament. Williams was a first-team All-SEC selection, and she was named as an Honorable Mention All-American by the Associated Press and WBCA.

== National team career ==
Williams played for the United States at the 2022 FIBA Under-17 Women's Basketball World Cup in Hungary. She averaged 8.1 points, 4.7 rebounds and 2.1 assists, helping her team win the gold medal.

In 3x3 basketball, Williams led the United States to three gold medals at the FIBA 3x3 U18 World Cup, being named MVP of each tournament from 2021 to 2023. She was named USA Basketball 3x3 Athlete of the Year in 2022 and 3x3 Female Athlete of the Year in 2023. Williams was named to the 2024 USA U23 3×3 Basketball Team that competed in July 2024 in the FIBA 3×3 U23 Nations League Americas Conference, a series of qualifying tournaments for the 2024 FIBA 3x3 U23 World Cup. She and the U23 team also participated in 3x3 Exhibition Game at the 2024 WNBA All-Star Game, competing against the USA 3x3 Olympic team. Williams was the best scorer of the U23 team with 5 points in a 16–19 loss.

== Career statistics ==
Legend
GP	Games played	GS	Games started	MPG	Minutes per game	RPG	Rebounds per game
APG	Assists per game	SPG	Steals per game	BPG	Blocks per game	PPG	Points per game
TO	Turnovers per game	FG%	Field-goal percentage	3P%	3-point field-goal percentage	FT%	Free-throw percentage
**Bold**	Career best	°	League leader

=== College ===
Year	Team	GP	GS	MPG	FG%	3P%	FT%	RPG	APG	SPG	BPG	TO	PPG
2023–24	LSU	34	33	**32.0**	**47.1**	38.0	78.0	**4.9**	2.9	**1.2**	0.3	**2.4**	14.5
2024–25	LSU	**37**	**37**	31.5	46.5	**38.6**	**85.8**	4.5	**3.4**	1.1	**0.4**	2.6	**17.3**
**Career**		71	70	31.7	46.7	38.3	82.7	4.6	3.1	1.1	0.3	2.5	15.9
Statistics retrieved from Sports-Reference.

== Personal life ==
Williams' parents both played college basketball: her mother, LaTonya, for Northwestern State, and her father, Patrick, for Bossier Parish Community College. Her younger brother, Kaleb, plays basketball and football for Parkway High School as a one-star recruit.

Williams became a member of Delta Sigma Theta sorority, on November 16, 2025, at LSU.
