= 3x3 basketball at the Mediterranean Games =

- 3x3 basketball
- Frequency: Every four years
- Inaugurated: 2018
- Most recent: 2026

3x3 basketball has been a discipline of the Mediterranean Games event since the first edition in 2018 in Tarragona, Spain. It had replaced the 5-on-5 basketball since this edition.

== Men's tournament ==
=== Summaries ===
Year	Host	Gold medal game			Bronze medal game		
Year	Host	Gold medalist	Score	Silver medalist	Bronze medalist	Score	Fourth place
2018; Details	(Spain); Tarragona	France	16 − 14 (OT)	Italy	Slovenia	18 − 11	Greece
2022; Details	(Algeria); Oran	France	19 − 13	Serbia	Spain	16 − 13	Turkey
2026; Details	(Italy); Taranto	Spain	20 − 18 (OT)	Italy	Algeria	21 − 19 (OT)	Turkey

=== Men's medal table ===
Rank	Nation	Gold	Silver	Bronze	Total
1	France	2	0	0	2
2	Spain	1	0	1	2
3	Italy	0	2	0	2
4	Serbia	0	1	0	1
5	Algeria	0	0	1	1
5	Slovenia	0	0	1	1
Totals (6 entries)		3	3	3	9

== Women's tournament ==
=== Summaries ===
Year	Host	Gold medal game			Bronze medal game		
Year	Host	Gold medalist	Score	Silver medalist	Bronze medalist	Score	Fourth place
2018; Details	(Spain); Tarragona	France	10 − 8	Spain	Portugal	21 − 20	Serbia
2022; Details	(Algeria); Oran	Spain	12 − 11 (OT)	France	Italy	14 − 12	Turkey
2026; Details	(Italy); Taranto	Spain	13 − 11	Italy	France	21 − 9	Cyprus

=== Women's medal table ===
Rank	Nation	Gold	Silver	Bronze	Total
1	Spain	2	1	0	3
2	France	1	1	1	3
3	Italy	0	1	1	2
4	Portugal	0	0	1	1
Totals (4 entries)		3	3	3	9

== All-time medal table ==
Updated with 2026 results.

Rank	Nation	Gold	Silver	Bronze	Total
1	France	3	1	1	5
1	Spain	3	1	1	5
3	Italy	0	3	1	4
4	Serbia	0	1	0	1
5	Algeria	0	0	1	1
5	Portugal	0	0	1	1
5	Slovenia	0	0	1	1
Totals (7 entries)		6	6	6	18

== See also ==
- Basketball at the Mediterranean Games
