= 3x3 basketball at the African Games =

- 3x3 basketball
- Frequency: Every four years
- Inaugurated: 2019
- Most recent: 2023

3x3 basketball has been a discipline of the African Games event since the first edition in 2019 in Rabat, Morocco. It had replaced the 5-on-5 basketball since this edition.

== Men's tournaments ==
=== Summaries ===
Men's 3x3 basketball
Year	Host	Gold	Silver	Bronze
2019; Details	(Morocco) Rabat	Madagascar	Egypt	Nigeria
2023; Details	(Ghana) Accra	Algeria	Ghana	Uganda

=== Medal table, men's ===
Rank	Nation	Gold	Silver	Bronze	Total
1	Algeria	1	0	0	1
1	Madagascar	1	0	0	1
3	Egypt	0	1	0	1
3	Ghana	0	1	0	1
5	Nigeria	0	0	1	1
5	Uganda	0	0	1	1
Totals (6 entries)		2	2	2	6

=== Men's participation teams ===
Nation	(Morocco) 2019	(Ghana) 2023	Years
Algeria		1st	1
Angola	5th		1
Benin		16th	1
Botswana		4th	1
Burkina Faso		5th	1
Central African Republic		7th	1
DR Congo	6th	14th	2
Egypt	2nd	11th	2
Equatorial Guinea	7th		1
Ghana		2nd	1
Ivory Coast		10th	1
Kenya	9th	9th	2
Madagascar	1st	6th	2
Mali	4th	13th	2
Morocco	8th		1
Niger	10th		1
Nigeria	3rd		1
Rwanda		8th	1
Togo		12th	1
Uganda		3rd	1
Zambia		15th	1
Total	10	16	

== Women's tournaments ==
=== Summaries ===
Women's 3x3 basketball
Year	Host	Gold	Silver	Bronze
2019; Details	(Morocco) Rabat	Nigeria	Mali	DR Congo
2023; Details	(Ghana) Accra	Mali	Nigeria	DR Congo

=== Medal table, women's ===
Rank	Nation	Gold	Silver	Bronze	Total
1	Mali	1	1	0	2
1	Nigeria	1	1	0	2
3	DR Congo	0	0	2	2
Totals (3 entries)		2	2	2	6

=== Women's participation teams ===
Nation	(Morocco) 2019	(Ghana) 2023	Years
Algeria		12th	1
Benin		4th	1
Ivory Coast		8th	1
DR Congo	3rd	3rd	2
Egypt	7th	6th	2
Equatorial Guinea	12th		1
Ethiopia	10th	13th	2
Gambia	8th		1
Ghana		7th	1
Kenya	4th		1
Madagascar		9th	1
Mali	2nd	1st	2
Morocco	9th		1
Niger	11th		1
Nigeria	1st	2nd	2
Rwanda		5th	1
Togo		11th	1
Tunisia	6th		1
Uganda	5th	10th	2
Total	12	13	

== Dunk & Shoot-out contest tournaments ==
=== Dunk contest ===
Dunk contest
Year	Host	Gold medalists	Silver medalists	Bronze medalists
2023; Details	(Ghana); Accra	(Mali); Soumaila Sissouma	(Benin); Zimé Nazif Mora Lafia	(Algeria); Zayd Yahiaoui

=== Shoot-out contest ===
Shoot-out contest
Year	Host	Gold medalists	Silver medalists	Bronze medalists
2023; Details	(Ghana); Accra	(Egypt); Habiba El-Gizawy	(Burkina Faso); Abdoul Sami Ouattara	(Ghana); Hannah Amoako

=== Medal table, Dunk & Shoot-out contest ===
Rank	Nation	Gold	Silver	Bronze	Total
1	Egypt (EGY)	1	0	0	1
1	Mali (MLI)	1	0	0	1
3	Benin (BEN)	0	1	0	1
3	Burkina Faso (BUR)	0	1	0	1
5	Algeria (ALG)	0	0	1	1
5	Ghana (GHA)	0	0	1	1
Totals (6 entries)		2	2	2	6

== Total medal table ==
Rank	Nation	Gold	Silver	Bronze	Total
1	Mali (MLI)	2	1	0	3
2	Nigeria (NGR)	1	1	1	3
3	Egypt (EGY)	1	1	0	2
4	Algeria (ALG)	1	0	1	2
5	Madagascar (MAD)	1	0	0	1
6	Ghana (GHA)	0	1	1	2
7	Benin (BEN)	0	1	0	1
7	Burkina Faso (BUR)	0	1	0	1
9	(Democratic Republic of the Congo) DR Congo (COD)	0	0	2	2
10	Uganda (UGA)	0	0	1	1
Totals (10 entries)		6	6	6	18
