= Algeria men's national 3x3 team =

Algeria
- FIBA ranking: 121
- FIBA zone: FIBA Africa
- National federation: FABB

World Cup
- Appearances: 0

Africa Cup
- Appearances: 3
- Medals: Bronze: (2024)

African Games
- Appearances: 1
- Medals: Gold: (2023)

The Algeria men's national 3x3 team is a national 3x3 basketball team of Algeria, governed by the Algerian Basketball Federation. It represents the country in international 3x3 (3 against 3) basketball competitions.

The team's head coach is Merouane Bouachir.

== Honours ==
Event	Gold	Silver	Bronze	Fourth	Total
3x3 Africa Cup	0	0	1	1	1
African Games	1	0	0	0	1
Mediterranean Games	0	0	1	0	1
Total	1	0	2	1	3

== Competitions ==
=== Africa Cup ===
Year	Position	Pld	W	L	Players
(Togo) 2017 Lomé	Did not enter				
(Togo) 2018 Lomé	Did not enter				
(Uganda) 2019 Kampala	Did not enter				
(Egypt) 2022 Cairo	Did not enter				
(Egypt) 2023 Cairo	4th	6	2	4	Ammour, Belkhodja, Messaoudi, Mostefai
(Madagascar) 2024 Antananarivo	3rd	6	4	2	Messaoudi, Lefkir, Sedoud, Mokhfi,
(Madagascar) 2025 Antananarivo	4th	5	3	2	Ammour, Henna, Messaoudi, Yahiaoui
Total	3/7	17	9	8	

=== African Games ===
Year	Position	Pld	W	L	Players
(Morocco) 2019 Rabat	Did not enter				
(Ghana) 2023 Accra	1st	6	5	1	Bouhmama, Lefkir, Yahiaoui, Yahiatene
Total	1/2	6	5	1	

=== Mediterranean Games ===
Year	Position	Pld	W	L	Players
(Spain) 2018 Tarragona	Did not enter				
(Algeria) 2022 Oran	5th	5	3	2	Bellil, Hifi, Medjoubi, Taleb
(Italy) 2026 Taranto	3rd	6	5	1	Yahiatene, Qittane, Aouana, Bouhmama
Total	2/3	11	8	3	

== See also ==
- Algeria national basketball team
