= 2026 FIBA 3x3 Africa Cup – Women's tournament =

Tournament details
- Host country: Madagascar
- City: Antananarivo
- Dates: 3–6 December
- Teams: TBD

The 2026 FIBA 3x3 Africa Cup – Women's tournament will be the 8th edition of the FIBA 3x3 Africa Cup, the annual international 3x3 basketball championship organised under the auspices of FIBA Africa for African women's national teams.

The tournament will take place in Antananarivo, marking the third time the city hosts the event and third time it will be in Madagascar after, 2024, and 2025.

Madagascar are the two-time defending champions, most recently beating Egypt in the final in Antananarivo.

== Host selection ==
On 13 April 2026, Madagascar's capital, Antananarivo, was announced as the hosts. This marks the third time the city hosts the event and third time it will be in Madagascar after, 2024, and 2025.

== See also ==
- 2026 FIBA 3x3 Africa Cup – Men's tournament
