= 3x3 basketball at the 2026 Mediterranean Games – Women's tournament =

Women's 3x3 basketball at the 2026 Mediterranean Games
- Venue: Giardini Peripato
- Location: (Italy) Taranto
- Dates: 29 August – 1 September
- Nations: 13

Medalists
gold medal	Spain
silver medal	Italy
bronze medal	France

Women's 3x3 basketball tournament at the 2026 Mediterranean Games was held from 29 August to 1 September at the Giardini Peripato, in Taranto, Italy.

== Preliminary rounds ==
All times are local (UTC+2).

=== Group A ===
Pos	Team	Pld	W	L	PF	PA	PD	Qualification
1	Spain	2	2	0	43	23	+20	Quarterfinals
2	Portugal	2	1	1	31	33	−2	Quarterfinals
3	Egypt	2	0	2	15	33	−18	

Source: Taranto 2026
Rules for classification: 1) Wins; 2) Head-to-head record; 3) Points scored.

29 August
17:35

Report

Spain	21–4	Egypt

Giardini Peripato, Taranto

29 August
18:50

Report

Portugal	12–11	Egypt

Giardini Peripato, Taranto

30 August
21:05

Report

Spain	22–19	Portugal

Giardini Peripato, Taranto

=== Group B ===
Pos	Team	Pld	W	L	PF	PA	PD	Qualification
1	France	2	2	0	42	27	+15	Quarterfinals
2	Slovenia	2	1	1	33	33	0	Quarterfinals
3	Croatia	2	0	2	21	36	−15	

Source: Taranto 2026
Rules for classification: 1) Wins; 2) Head-to-head record; 3) Points scored.

29 August
20:40

Report

France	21–9	Croatia

Giardini Peripato, Taranto

30 August
17:25

Report

Slovenia	15–12	Croatia

Giardini Peripato, Taranto

30 August
19:15

Report

France	21–18	Slovenia

Giardini Peripato, Taranto

=== Group C ===
Pos	Team	Pld	W	L	PF	PA	PD	Qualification
1	Italy (H)	2	2	0	31	18	+13	Quarterfinals
2	Greece	2	1	1	29	22	+7	Quarterfinals
3	Kosovo	2	0	2	16	36	−20	

Source: Taranto 2026
Rules for classification: 1) Wins; 2) Head-to-head record; 3) Points scored.
(H) Hosts

29 August
18:00

Report

Greece	18–9	Kosovo

Giardini Peripato, Taranto

29 August
19:50

Report

Italy	18–7	Kosovo

Giardini Peripato, Taranto

29 August
21:40

Report

Italy	13–11	Greece

Giardini Peripato, Taranto

=== Group D ===
Pos	Team	Pld	W	L	PF	PA	PD	Qualification
1	Cyprus	3	3	0	47	20	+27	Quarterfinals
2	Turkey	3	2	1	38	33	+5	Quarterfinals
3	Tunisia	3	1	2	34	37	−3	
4	Algeria	3	0	3	33	62	−29	

Source: Taranto 2026
Rules for classification: 1) Wins; 2) Head-to-head record; 3) Points scored.

29 August
15:45

Report

Algeria	8–21	Cyprus

Giardini Peripato, Taranto

29 August
16:10

Report

Turkey	11–8	Tunisia

Giardini Peripato, Taranto

30 August
16:10

Report

Cyprus	14–5	Tunisia

Giardini Peripato, Taranto

30 August
16:35

Report

Algeria	13–20	Turkey

Giardini Peripato, Taranto

30 August
18:25

Report

Turkey	7–12	Cyprus

Giardini Peripato, Taranto

30 August
21:05

Report

Tunisia	21–12	Algeria

Giardini Peripato, Taranto

== Elimination round ==
=== Bracket ===
Quarterfinals
31 August
Spain	20
Greece	8
31 August
Cyprus	21
Slovenia	15
31 August
France	21
Turkey	13
31 August
Italy	16
Portugal	12

Semifinals
1 September
Spain	19
Cyprus	12
1 September
France	10
Italy	11

Gold medal
1 September
Spain	13
Italy	11
Bronze medal
1 September
Cyprus	9
France	21

=== Quarterfinals ===
31 August
17:35

Report

Spain	20–8	Greece

Giardini Peripato, Taranto

31 August
18:00

Report

Cyprus	21–15	Slovenia

Giardini Peripato, Taranto

31 August
19:35

Report

France	21–13	Turkey

Giardini Peripato, Taranto

31 August
20:00

Report

Italy	16–12	Portugal

Giardini Peripato, Taranto

=== Semifinals ===
1 September
16:50

Report

Spain	19–12	Cyprus

Giardini Peripato, Taranto

1 September
17:15

Report

France	10–11	Italy

Giardini Peripato, Taranto

=== Bronze medal game ===
1 September
18:50

Report

Cyprus	9–21	France

Giardini Peripato, Taranto

=== Gold medal game ===
1 September
20:00

Report

Spain	13–11	Italy

Giardini Peripato, Taranto

== Final standings ==
Rank	Team	Record
1st place, gold medalist(s)	Spain	5–0
2nd place, silver medalist(s)	Italy	4–1
3rd place, bronze medalist(s)	France	4–1
4	Cyprus	4–2
5	Turkey	2–2
6	Slovenia	1–2
7	Portugal	1–2
8	Greece	1–2
9	Tunisia	1–2
10	Algeria	0–3
11	Croatia	0–2
12	Kosovo	0–2
13	Egypt	0–2
