= 3x3 basketball at the 2022 Mediterranean Games =

- Venue: Sidi M’hamed Public Garden Court
- Dates: 30 June – 3 July
- Nations: 13
- Teams: 13 (men); 11 (women)

The 3x3 basketball tournament at the 2022 Mediterranean Games in Oran took place from 30 June to 3 July 2022.

== Medal summary ==
Event	Gold	Silver	Bronze
Men	France; Arthur Bruyas; Léopold Delaunay; Marcus Gomis; Lorenzo Thirouard-Samson	Serbia; Miloš Antić; Nikola Kovačević; Stefan Momirov; Nemanja Stanković	Spain; Guillem Arcos; Isaac Mayo; Unai Mendicote; Pablo González
Women	Spain; Aina Ayuso; Carolina Guerrero; Natalia Rodríguez; Helena Pueyo	France; Camille Droguet; Anna Ngo Ndjock; Marie Pardon; Emma Peytour	Italy; Giulia Bongiorno; Beatrice Del Pero; Sara Madera; Giovanna Elena Smorto

== Participating nations ==
Men

Federation	Nation
FIBA Africa	Algeria; Egypt; Tunisia
FIBA Europe	Croatia; Cyprus; France; Greece; Italy; Portugal; Serbia; Slovenia; Spain; Turkey

Women

Federation	Nation
FIBA Africa	Algeria; Egypt; Tunisia
FIBA Europe	France; Greece; Italy; Portugal; Serbia; Slovenia; Spain; Turkey
