= 3x3 basketball at the 2026 Mediterranean Games =

- Venue: Peripato Gardens
- Dates: 29 August – 1 September
- Nations: 16
- Teams: 16 (men); 13 (women)

The 3x3 basketball tournament at the 2026 Mediterranean Games in Taranto took place from 29 August to 1 September 2026.

== Medal summary ==
Event	Gold	Silver	Bronze
Men	Spain; Jordi Boix; Juan García-Abril; Darío López; Rubén Salas	Italy; Matteo Corgnati; Matteo Gherardini; Francesco Gravaghi; Tiagande Willis Tio	Algeria; Abdelmalek Aouana; Mehdi Bouhmama; Matteo Qittane; Nael Yahiatene
Women	Spain; Tayra Eke; Marta Morales; Elena Moreno; Elena Rodríguez	Italy; Giorgia Amatori; Ilaria Bernardi; Kenko Ngamene; Nancy N'Guessan	France; Lola Foirest; Ilona Hattab; Davina Kasongo; Zarah Velleyen

== Participating nations ==
Men

Federation	Nation
FIBA Africa	Algeria; Egypt; Tunisia
FIBA Europe	Bosnia and Herzegovina; Croatia; Cyprus; France; Greece; Italy; Kosovo; North Macedonia; Portugal; Serbia; Slovenia; Spain; Turkey

Women

Federation	Nation
FIBA Africa	Algeria; Egypt; Tunisia
FIBA Europe	Croatia; Cyprus; France; Greece; Italy; Kosovo; Portugal; Slovenia; Spain; Turkey
