= 3x3 basketball at the 2022 Mediterranean Games – Women's tournament =

Women's 3x3 basketball at the 2022 Mediterranean Games
- Venue: Sidi M'hamed Public Garden Court
- Location: (Algeria) Oran
- Dates: 30 June – 3 July
- Nations: 11

Medalists
gold medal	Spain
silver medal	France
bronze medal	Italy

The women's 3x3 basketball tournament at the 2022 Mediterranean Games was held from 30 June to 3 July at the Sidi M'hamed Public Garden Court, in Oran, Algeria.

== Preliminary round ==
All times are local (UTC+1).

=== Group A ===
Pos	Team	Pld	W	L	PF	PA	PD	Qualification
1	Serbia	2	2	0	25	18	+7	Quarterfinals
2	Portugal	2	1	1	26	27	−1	Quarterfinals
3	Algeria (H)	2	0	2	20	26	−6	Ninth place game

Source: Oran 2022
Rules for classification: 1) Wins; 2) Head-to-head record; 3) Points scored.
(H) Hosts

30 June
20:40

Report

Algeria	7–11	Serbia

Sidi M’hamed Public Garden Court, Oran

1 July
19:40

Report

Portugal	15–13	Algeria

Sidi M’hamed Public Garden Court, Oran

1 July
23:00

Report

Serbia	14–11	Portugal

Sidi M’hamed Public Garden Court, Oran

=== Group B ===
Pos	Team	Pld	W	L	PF	PA	PD	Qualification
1	France	3	3	0	50	21	+29	Quarterfinals
2	Italy	3	2	1	41	29	+12	Quarterfinals
3	Tunisia	3	1	2	24	46	−22	Quarterfinals
4	Egypt	3	0	3	22	41	−19	9–11th place semifinal

Source: Oran 2022
Rules for classification: 1) Wins; 2) Head-to-head record; 3) Points scored.

30 June
18:00

Report

France	21–2	Tunisia
Pts: Droguet, Peytour-Raison 8		Pts: Ben Gara, Jdidi Bagane 1

Sidi M’hamed Public Garden Court, Oran
Referees: Maria Giulia Forni (ITA)

30 June
18:20

Report

Egypt	4–15	Italy

Sidi M’hamed Public Garden Court, Oran

30 June
21:20

Report

Tunisia	12–17	Italy

Sidi M’hamed Public Garden Court, Oran

30 June
21:40

Report

France	16–10	Egypt

Sidi M’hamed Public Garden Court, Oran

1 July
20:00

Report

Tunisia	10–8	Egypt

Sidi M’hamed Public Garden Court, Oran

1 July
20:20

Report

Italy	9–13	France

Sidi M’hamed Public Garden Court, Oran

=== Group C ===
Pos	Team	Pld	W	L	PF	PA	PD	Qualification
1	Spain	3	3	0	55	40	+15	Quarterfinals
2	Turkey	3	2	1	40	40	0	Quarterfinals
3	Slovenia	3	1	2	36	37	−1	Quarterfinals
4	Greece	3	0	3	37	51	−14	9–11th place semifinal

Source: Oran 2022
Rules for classification: 1) Wins; 2) Head-to-head record; 3) Points scored.

30 June
19:20

Report

Spain	18–15	Turkey

Sidi M’hamed Public Garden Court, Oran

30 June
19:40

Report

Greece	11–15	Slovenia

Sidi M’hamed Public Garden Court, Oran

30 June
22:40

Report

Turkey	10–9	Slovenia

Sidi M’hamed Public Garden Court, Oran

30 June
23:00

Report

Spain	21–13	Greece

Sidi M’hamed Public Garden Court, Oran

1 July
21:40

Report

Turkey	15–13	Greece

Sidi M’hamed Public Garden Court, Oran

1 July
22:00

Report

Slovenia	12–16	Spain

Sidi M’hamed Public Garden Court, Oran

== Elimination round ==
=== Bracket ===
Championship bracket

Quarterfinals
2 July
Serbia	11
Italy	17
2 July
Spain	22
Tunisia	6
2 July
Portugal	10
Turkey	13
2 July
France	20
Slovenia	5

Semifinals
3 July
Italy	11
Spain	16
3 July
Turkey	10
France	19

Gold medal
3 July
Spain	12
France	11
Bronze medal
3 July
Italy	14
Turkey	12

Fifth place bracket

5–8th place semifinals
3 July
Serbia	11
Tunisia	13
3 July
Portugal	17
Slovenia	15

Fifth place
3 July
Tunisia	6
Portugal	13
Seventh place
3 July
Serbia	13
Slovenia	9

Ninth place bracket

9–11th place semifinal
2 July
Egypt	11
Greece	17

Ninth place
2 July
Greece	16
Algeria	9

=== Quarterfinals ===
2 July
20:00

Report

Serbia	11–17	Italy

Sidi M’hamed Public Garden Court, Oran

2 July
20:20

Report

France	20–5	Slovenia

Sidi M’hamed Public Garden Court, Oran

2 July
21:20

Report

Portugal	10–13	Turkey

Sidi M’hamed Public Garden Court, Oran

2 July
21:40

Report

Spain	22–6	Tunisia

Sidi M’hamed Public Garden Court, Oran

=== 9–11th place semifinal ===
2 July
19:40

Report

Egypt	11–17	Greece

Sidi M’hamed Public Garden Court, Oran

=== 5–8th place semifinals ===
3 July
18:50

Report

Serbia	11–13	Tunisia

Sidi M’hamed Public Garden Court, Oran

3 July
19:10

Report

Portugal	11–8	Slovenia

Sidi M’hamed Public Garden Court, Oran

=== Semifinals ===
3 July
17:30

Report

Italy	11–16	Spain

Sidi M’hamed Public Garden Court, Oran

3 July
17:50

Report

Turkey	10–19	France

Sidi M’hamed Public Garden Court, Oran

=== Ninth place game ===
2 July
22:40

Report

Greece	16–9	Algeria

Sidi M’hamed Public Garden Court, Oran

=== Seventh place game ===
3 July
20:10

Report

Serbia	13–9	Slovenia

Sidi M’hamed Public Garden Court, Oran

=== Fifth place game ===
3 July
20:30

Report

Tunisia	6–13	Portugal

Sidi M’hamed Public Garden Court, Oran

=== Bronze medal game ===
3 July
21:30

Report

Italy	14–12	Turkey

Sidi M’hamed Public Garden Court, Oran

=== Gold medal game ===
3 July
22:10

Report

Spain	12–11 (OT)	France

Sidi M’hamed Public Garden Court, Oran

== Final standings ==
Rank	Team
1st place, gold medalist(s)	Spain
2nd place, silver medalist(s)	France
3rd place, bronze medalist(s)	Italy
4	Turkey
5	Portugal
6	Tunisia
7	Serbia
8	Slovenia
9	Greece
10	Algeria
11	Egypt
