= 2023 FIBA 3x3 Africa Cup – Women's tournament =

Tournament details
- Host country: Egypt
- City: Cairo
- Dates: December 1–3
- Teams: 7

Final positions
- Champions: Kenya (1st title)
- Runners-up: Egypt
- Third place: Madagascar
- Fourth place: Uganda

Tournament statistics
- MVP: (Kenya) Natalie Mwangale

The 2023 FIBA 3x3 Africa Cup – Women's tournament is the fifth edition of this continental championship. The event was held in Cairo, Egypt for the second consecutive year. It was contested by 7 teams.

Kenya won their first title with a win over Egypt in the final.

== Host selection ==
Egypt's capital, Cairo, was given the hosting rights on 31 May 2022.

== Participating teams ==
All African National Federations were invited to register a team for the FIBA 3x3 Africa Cup 2023.

Pool A

- Egypt (1)
- Uganda (3)
- Algeria (5)
- Senegal (8) (withdrew)
- Mali (9) (withdrew)

Pool B

- Benin (2)
- Kenya (4)
- Madagascar (6)
- Morocco (7)
- Nigeria (10) (withdrew)

== Preliminary round ==
The pools were announced on July 20, 2023.

=== Pool A ===
Pos	Team	Pld	W	L	PF	PA	PD	Qualification	(Egypt)	(Uganda)	(Algeria)	(Senegal)	(Mali)
1	Egypt (H)	2	2	0	41	20	+21	Semi-finals		20–10		Canc.	Canc.
2	Uganda	2	1	1	20	26	−6	Quarter-finals			10–6	Canc.	Canc.
3	Algeria	2	0	2	16	31	−15	Quarter-finals	10–21			Canc.	Canc.
4	Senegal	0	0	0	0	0	0	Withdrew	Canc.	Canc.	Canc.		Canc.
5	Mali	0	0	0	0	0	0	Withdrew	Canc.	Canc.	Canc.	Canc.	

Source: FIBA
Rules for classification: 1) Wins; 2) Head-to-head record; 3) Points scored.
(H) Hosts

=== Pool B ===
Pos	Team	Pld	W	L	PF	PA	PD	Qualification	(Kenya)	(Madagascar)	(Morocco)	(Benin)	(Nigeria)
1	Kenya	3	3	0	53	33	+20	Semi-finals			13–8	21–14	Canc.
2	Madagascar	3	2	1	38	40	−2	Quarter-finals	11–19		14–10		Canc.
3	Morocco	3	1	2	32	40	−8	Quarter-finals				14–13	Canc.
4	Benin	3	0	3	38	48	−10			11–13			Canc.
5	Nigeria	0	0	0	0	0	0	Withdrew	Canc.	Canc.	Canc.	Canc.	

Source: FIBA
Rules for classification: 1) Wins; 2) Head-to-head record; 3) Points scored.

== Knockout stage ==
All times are local.

Quarter-finals
3 Dec 2023 – 15:25
Uganda	15
Morocco	14
3 Dec 2023 – 15:00
Madagascar	16
Algeria	12

Semi-finals
3 Dec 2023 – 17:00
Egypt	18
Madagascar	14
3 Dec 2023 – 17:25
Kenya	16
Uganda	14

Final
3 Dec 2023 – 19:50
Egypt	20
Kenya	21
Bronze medal
3 Dec 2023 – 19:00
Madagascar	19
Uganda	17

== Final standings ==
Pos	Team	Pld	W	L	PF	PA	PD
1	Kenya	5	5	0	90	67	+23
2	Egypt	5	4	1	78	55	+23
3	Madagascar	6	4	2	87	87	0
4	Uganda	5	2	3	66	75	–9
5	Morocco	4	1	3	46	55	–9
6	Algeria	3	0	3	28	47	–19
7	Benin	3	0	3	38	48	–10

== Awards ==
These players were given the awards after the competition:

=== Most valuable player ===
- (Kenya) Natalie Mwangale

=== Top scorer ===
- (Madagascar) Sydonie Marie Erica Andriamihajanirina (29 points)

=== Team of the tournament ===
- (Kenya) Natalie Mwangale
- (Egypt) Raneem El-Gedawy
- (Madagascar) Harisoa Hajanirina

== See also ==
- 2023 FIBA 3x3 World Cup – Men's tournament
- 2023 FIBA 3x3 World Cup – Women's tournament
- 2023 FIBA 3x3 Africa Cup – Men's tournament
- 2023 FIBA 3x3 U18 World Cup – Men's tournament
- 2023 FIBA 3x3 U18 World Cup – Women's tournament
- 2023 FIBA 3x3 U17 Africa Cup – Men's tournament
- 2023 FIBA 3x3 U17 Africa Cup – Women's tournament
- 2023 FIBA 3x3 Asia Cup
- 2023 FIBA 3x3 AmeriCup – Men's tournament
- 2023 FIBA 3x3 AmeriCup – Women's tournament
- 2023 FIBA 3x3 Europe Cup
