= 2025 FIBA 3x3 Africa Cup – Women's tournament =

Tournament details
- Host country: Madagascar
- City: Antananarivo
- Dates: 5–7 December
- Teams: 10

Final positions
- Champions: Madagascar (2nd title)
- Runners-up: Egypt
- Third place: Kenya
- Fourth place: Rwanda

Tournament statistics
- MVP: (Madagascar) Minaharisoa Jaofera

The 2025 FIBA 3x3 Africa Cup was the seventh edition of this continental championship. For the second consecutive time the event was held in Antananarivo, Madagascar, from 5 to 7 December 2025.

== Host selection ==
Madagascar's capital, Antananarivo, was given the hosting rights in November 2025.

== Venue ==
The venue was in the Mahamasina Sports and Culture Palace.

== Participating teams ==
All African National Federations were invited to register a team.

Preliminary round

Pool A

- Uganda (1)
- Madagascar (4)
- Egypt (5)
- Tunisia (8)
- DR Congo (9)

Pool B

- Benin (2)
- Kenya (3)
- Rwanda (6)
- Comoros (7)
- Botswana (10)

== Preliminary round ==
=== Pool A ===
Pos	Team	Pld	W	L	PF	PA	PD	Qualification	(Madagascar)	(Egypt)	(Tunisia)	(Democratic Republic of the Congo)	(Uganda)
1	Madagascar (H)	4	4	0	78	63	+15	Knockout stage		19–17		21–13	
2	Egypt	4	3	1	76	53	+23	Knockout stage			17–13		21–14
3	Tunisia	4	2	2	59	60	−1		18–20			8–7	
4	DR Congo	4	1	3	39	60	−21			7–21			12–10
5	Uganda	4	0	4	55	71	−16		15–18		16–20		

Source: FIBA
Rules for classification: 1) Wins; 2) Head-to-head record; 3) Points scored.
(H) Hosts

=== Pool B ===
Pos	Team	Pld	W	L	PF	PA	PD	Qualification	(Rwanda)	(Kenya)	(Comoros)	(Benin)	(Botswana)
1	Rwanda	4	4	0	77	46	+31	Knockout stage			22–10	19–15	
2	Kenya	4	3	1	75	61	+14	Knockout stage	12–15				21–17
3	Comoros	4	2	2	51	65	−14			13–21			15–11
4	Benin	4	1	3	63	65	−2			16–21	11–13		
5	Botswana	4	0	4	49	78	−29		9–21			12–21	

Source: FIBA
Rules for classification: 1) Wins; 2) Head-to-head record; 3) Points scored.

== Knockout stage ==
Semi-finals
7 December
Madagascar	21
Kenya	20
7 December
Rwanda	12
Egypt	21

Final
7 December
Madagascar	17
Egypt	16
Third place
7 December
Kenya	14
Rwanda	11

== Final ranking ==
Pos	Team	Pld	W	L	W%	PF	PA
1st place, gold medalist(s)	Madagascar	6	6	0	100%	116	19.3
2nd place, silver medalist(s)	Egypt	6	4	2	67%	113	18.8
3rd place, bronze medalist(s)	Kenya	6	4	2	67%	109	18.2
4	Rwanda	6	4	2	67%	99	16.5
5	Tunisia	4	2	2	50%	59	14.8
6	Comoros	4	2	2	50%	51	12.8
7	Benin	4	1	3	25%	63	15.8
8	DR Congo	4	1	3	25%	39	9.8
9	Uganda	4	0	4	0%	55	13.8
10	Botswana	4	0	4	0%	49	12.3

== See also ==
- 2025 FIBA 3x3 Africa Cup – Men's tournament
- 2025 FIBA 3x3 Europe Cup – Men's tournament
- 2025 FIBA 3x3 Europe Cup – Women's tournament
- 2025 FIBA 3x3 AmeriCup – Men's tournament
- 2025 FIBA 3x3 AmeriCup – Women's tournament
- 2025 FIBA 3x3 Asia Cup – Men's tournament
- 2025 FIBA 3x3 Asia Cup – Women's tournament
