= Tunisia men's national 3x3 team =

National 3x3 basketball team

Tunisia
- FIBA ranking: 11
- Joined FIBA: 1956
- FIBA zone: FIBA Africa
- National federation: FTBB
- Nickname(s): نسور قرطاج (Eagles of Carthage)

FIBA 3x3 World Cup
- Appearances: 1 (2014)
- Medals: None

FIBA 3x3 Africa Cup
- Appearances: 1 (2022)
- Medals: None

African Beach Games
- Appearances: 1 (2023)
- Medals: Gold (gold) : (2023)

Pan Arab Games
- Appearances: 1
- Medals: Silver (silver) : (2023)
Home	Away
Medal record
Representing Tunisia
Men's 3x3 basketball
African Beach Games
Gold medal – first place	2023
Pan Arab Games
Silver medal – second place	2023

The Tunisian men's national 3x3 team, nicknamed Les Aigles de Carthage (The Eagles of Carthage or The Carthage Eagles), is a national basketball team of Tunisia, administered by the Tunisia Basketball Federation (FTBB). (Arabic: الجامعة التونسية لكرة السلة)

It represents the country in international 3x3 men's (3 against 3) basketball competitions.

== Competitions ==
=== Performance at Summer Olympics ===
Year	Position	Pld	W	L	Players
(Japan) 2020 Tokyo	Did not enter				—N/a
(France) 2024 Paris	Did not enter				—N/a
Total					

=== Performance at World Cup ===
Year	Pos	Pld	W	L	Players
(Greece) 2012	Did not enter				
(Russia) 2014	11th	6	4	2	Firas Lahyani
(China) 2016	Did not enter				
(France) 2017	Did not enter				
(Philippines) 2018	Did not enter				
(Netherlands) 2019	Did not enter				
(Belgium) 2022	Did not enter				
(Austria) 2023	Did not enter				
(Mongolia) 2025	Did not enter				
(Poland) 2026	Did not enter				
(Singapore) 2027	To be determined				
Total	1/11	6	4	2	

=== Performance at Africa Cup ===
Year	Pos	Pld	W	L	Players
(Togo) 2017	Did not participate				
(Togo) 2018	Did not participate				
(Uganda) 2019	Did not participate				
(Egypt) 2022	4th	5	2	3	
(Egypt) 2023	Did not participate				
(Madagascar) 2024	Did not participate				
(Madagascar) 2025	6th	3	1	2	
Total	2/7	8	3	5	

=== Performance at African Beach Games ===
Year	Pos	Pld	W	L	Players
(Cape Verde) 2019	Did not participate				
(Tunisia) 2023	1st (gold)				
Total	1/2	0	0	0	

=== Performance at Mediterranean Games ===
Year	Pos	Pld	W	L	Players
(Spain) 2018	9th	2	1	1	Firas Lahyani
(Algeria) 2022	11th	3	0	3	
Total	2/2	5	1	4	

=== Performance at Pan Arab Games ===
Year	Pos	Pld	W	L	Players
(Algeria) 2023	2nd (silver)				
Total	1/1				

== See also ==
- Tunisia men's national basketball team
- Tunisia women's national 3x3 team
- Tunisia men's national under-23 3x3 team
- Tunisia men's national under-18 3x3 team
