= 3x3 basketball at the 2022 Mediterranean Games – Men's tournament =

Men's 3x3 basketball at the 2022 Mediterranean Games
- Venue: Sidi M’hamed Public Garden Court
- Location: (Algeria) Oran
- Dates: 30 June – 3 July
- Nations: 13

Medalists
gold medal	France
silver medal	Serbia
bronze medal	Spain

Men's 3x3 basketball tournament at the 2022 Mediterranean Games was held from 30 June to 3 July at the Sidi M’hamed Public Garden Court, in Oran, Algeria.

== Preliminary round ==
All times are local (UTC+1).

=== Group A ===
Pos	Team	Pld	W	L	PF	PA	PD	Qualification
1	Turkey	2	1	1	39	29	+10	Quarterfinals
2	Algeria (H)	2	1	1	35	39	−4	Quarterfinals
3	Italy	2	1	1	31	37	−6	9–12th place semifinals

Source: Oran 2022
Rules for classification: 1) Wins; 2) Head-to-head record; 3) Points scored.
(H) Hosts

30 June
20:00

Report

Turkey	18–19	Algeria

Sidi M’hamed Public Garden Court, Oran

1 July
19:00

Report

Italy	10–21	Turkey

Sidi M’hamed Public Garden Court, Oran

1 July
22:20

Report

Algeria	16–21	Italy

Sidi M’hamed Public Garden Court, Oran

=== Group B ===
Pos	Team	Pld	W	L	PF	PA	PD	Qualification
1	Spain	2	2	0	35	17	+18	Quarterfinals
2	Portugal	2	1	1	24	22	+2	Quarterfinals
3	Slovenia	2	0	2	13	33	−20	9–12th place semifinals

Source: Oran 2022
Rules for classification: 1) Wins; 2) Head-to-head record; 3) Points scored.

30 June
20:20

Report

Spain	14–12	Portugal

Sidi M’hamed Public Garden Court, Oran

1 July
19:20

Report

Slovenia	5–21	Spain

Sidi M’hamed Public Garden Court, Oran

1 July
22:40

Report

Portugal	12–8	Slovenia

Sidi M’hamed Public Garden Court, Oran

=== Group C ===
Pos	Team	Pld	W	L	PF	PA	PD	Qualification
1	Serbia	2	2	0	40	35	+5	Quarterfinals
2	France	2	1	1	39	24	+15	Quarterfinals
3	Cyprus	2	0	2	19	39	−20	9–12th place semifinals

Source: Oran 2022
Rules for classification: 1) Wins; 2) Head-to-head record; 3) Points scored.

30 June
21:00

Report

Serbia	19–16	Cyprus

Sidi M’hamed Public Garden Court, Oran

1 July
20:40

Report

France	19–21	Serbia

Sidi M’hamed Public Garden Court, Oran

1 July
23:20

Report

Cyprus	3–20	France

Sidi M’hamed Public Garden Court, Oran

=== Group D ===
Pos	Team	Pld	W	L	PF	PA	PD	Qualification
1	Greece	3	3	0	52	44	+8	Quarterfinals
2	Croatia	3	1	2	47	44	+3	Quarterfinals
3	Egypt	3	1	2	37	43	−6	9–12th place semifinals
4	Tunisia	3	1	2	36	41	−5	

Source: Oran 2022
Rules for classification: 1) Wins; 2) Head-to-head record; 3) Points scored.

30 June
18:40

Report

Greece	17–16	Croatia
Pts: Stavrakoukas 7		Pts: Rajčić 6

Sidi M’hamed Public Garden Court, Oran
Referees: Aimeur Oussama (ALG)

30 June
19:00

Report

Egypt	10–8	Tunisia

Sidi M’hamed Public Garden Court, Oran

30 June
22:00

Report

Croatia	14–15	Tunisia

Sidi M’hamed Public Garden Court, Oran

30 June
22:20

Report

Greece	18–15	Egypt

Sidi M’hamed Public Garden Court, Oran

1 July
21:00

Report

Croatia	17–12	Egypt

Sidi M’hamed Public Garden Court, Oran

1 July
21:20

Report

Tunisia	13–17	Greece

Sidi M’hamed Public Garden Court, Oran

== Elimination round ==
=== Bracket ===
Championship bracket

Quarterfinals
2 July
Turkey	18
Portugal	14
2 July
Greece	20
France	22
2 July
Spain	21
Algeria	18
2 July
Serbia	17
Croatia	14

Semifinals
3 July
Turkey	12
France	15
3 July
Spain	13
Serbia	21

Gold medal
3 July
France	19
Serbia	13
Bronze medal
3 July
Turkey	13
Spain	16

Fifth place bracket

5–8th place semifinals
3 July
Portugal	19
Greece	17
3 July
Algeria	17
Croatia	15

Fifth place
3 July
Portugal	17
Algeria	21
Seventh place
3 July
Greece	12
Croatia	21

Ninth place bracket

9–12th place semifinals
2 July
Italy	21
Slovenia	18
2 July
Cyprus	14
Egypt	17

Ninth place
2 July
Italy	9
Egypt	11
Eleventh place
2 July
Slovenia	16
Cyprus	12

=== Quarterfinals ===
2 July
20:40

Report

Turkey	18–14	Portugal

Sidi M’hamed Public Garden Court, Oran

2 July
21:00

Report

Serbia	17–14	Croatia

Sidi M’hamed Public Garden Court, Oran

2 July
22:00

Report

Spain	21–18	Algeria

Sidi M’hamed Public Garden Court, Oran

2 July
22:20

Report

Greece	20–22	France

Sidi M’hamed Public Garden Court, Oran

=== 9–12th place semifinals ===
2 July
19:00

Report

Italy	21–18	Slovenia

Sidi M’hamed Public Garden Court, Oran

2 July
19:20

Report

Cyprus	14–17	Egypt

Sidi M’hamed Public Garden Court, Oran

=== 5–8th place semifinals ===
3 July
19:30

Report

Portugal	19–17	Greece

Sidi M’hamed Public Garden Court, Oran

3 July
19:50

Report

Algeria	17–15 (OT)	Croatia

Sidi M’hamed Public Garden Court, Oran

=== Semifinals ===
3 July
18:10

Report

Turkey	12–15	France

Sidi M’hamed Public Garden Court, Oran

3 July
18:30

Report

Spain	13–21	Serbia

Sidi M’hamed Public Garden Court, Oran

=== Eleventh place game ===
2 July
23:00

Report

Slovenia	16–12	Cyprus

Sidi M’hamed Public Garden Court, Oran

=== Ninth place game ===
2 July
23:20

Report

Italy	9–11	Egypt

Sidi M’hamed Public Garden Court, Oran

=== Seventh place game ===
3 July
20:50

Report

Greece	12–21	Croatia

Sidi M’hamed Public Garden Court, Oran

=== Fifth place game ===
3 July
21:10

Report

Algeria	17–21	Portugal

Sidi M’hamed Public Garden Court, Oran

=== Bronze medal game ===
3 July
21:50

Report

Turkey	13–16 (OT)	Spain

Sidi M’hamed Public Garden Court, Oran

=== Gold medal game ===
3 July
22:30

Report

France	19–13	Serbia

Sidi M’hamed Public Garden Court, Oran

== Final standings ==
Rank	Team
1st place, gold medalist(s)	France
2nd place, silver medalist(s)	Serbia
3rd place, bronze medalist(s)	Spain
4	Turkey
5	Algeria
6	Portugal
7	Croatia
8	Greece
9	Egypt
10	Italy
11	Slovenia
12	Cyprus
13	Tunisia
