= 2024 FIBA 3x3 Africa Cup =

2024 FIBA 3x3 Africa Cup consists of two sections:

- 2024 FIBA 3x3 Africa Cup – Men's tournament
- 2024 FIBA 3x3 Africa Cup – Women's tournament
