= 2022 FIBA 3x3 Africa Cup =

The 2022 FIBA 3x3 Africa Cup was the fourth edition of the African 3x3 basketball event which was held between 3 and 4 December, 2022 in Cairo, Egypt. The official venue was in front of the Baron Empain Palace. Both men's and women's national teams of Egypt qualified for the 2022 FIBA 3x3 World Cup.

== Participating teams ==
All African National Federations were invited to register a team for the FIBA 3x3 Africa Cup 2022.

=== Men's ===
Pool A

- Egypt (1)
- Rwanda (4)
- Botswana (5)
- Madagascar (8)

Pool B

- Kenya (2)
- Tunisia (3)
- DR Congo (6)
- Morocco (7)

=== Women's ===
Pool A

- Egypt (1)
- Tunisia (4)
- Rwanda (5)
- Madagascar (8)

Pool B

- Kenya (2)
- Benin (3)
- DR Congo (6)
- Morocco (7)

== Men's tournament ==
=== Pool stage ===
==== Pool A ====
Pos	Team	Pld	W	L	PF	PA	PD	PCT	Qualification	(Rwanda)	(Egypt)	(Madagascar)	(Botswana)
1	Rwanda	3	3	0	57	45	+12	1.000	Semifinal	—	21–19	21–19	15–7
2	Egypt	3	2	1	58	48	+10	.667	Play-in		—	18–17	21–10
3	Madagascar	3	1	2	52	48	+4	.333	Play-in			—	16–9
4	Botswana	3	0	3	26	52	−26	.000					—

Source: FIBA
Rules for classification: 1) Wins; 2) Head-to-head record; 3) Points scored; 4) Higher seed.

==== Pool B ====
Pos	Team	Pld	W	L	PF	PA	PD	PCT	Qualification	(Tunisia)	(Democratic Republic of the Congo)	(Morocco)	(Kenya)
1	Tunisia	3	3	0	29	29	0	1.000	Semifinal	—	17–15	12–14	w-0(f)
2	DR Congo	3	2	1	27	28	−1	.667	Play-in		—	12–11	w-0(f)
3	Morocco	3	1	2	25	24	+1	.333	Play-in			—	w-0(f)
4	Kenya	3	0	3	0	0	0	.000					—

Source: FIBA
Rules for classification: 1) Wins; 2) Head-to-head record; 3) Points scored; 4) Higher seed.

w = win, f = forfeit

=== Knockout stage ===
All times are local.

Quarter-finals
4 Dec 2022 – 16:50
DR Congo	11
Madagascar	18
4 Dec 2022 – 17:15
Egypt	14
Morocco	12

Semi-finals
4 Dec 2022 – 18:40
Rwanda	14
Madagascar	21
4 Dec 2022 – 19:05
Egypt	21
Tunisia	18

Final
4 Dec 2022 – 20:55
Madagascar	20
Egypt	17
Bronze medal
4 Dec 2022 – 20:05
Rwanda	21
Tunisia	17

=== Final standings ===
Pos	Team	Pld	W	L	PF
1	Madagascar	6	4	2	111
2	Egypt	6	4	2	110
3	Rwanda	5	4	1	92
4	Tunisia	5	2	3	64
5	DR Congo	4	2	2	38
6	Morocco	4	2	2	37
7	Botswana	3	0	3	26
8	Kenya	3	0	3	0

== Women's tournament ==
=== Pool stage ===
==== Pool A ====
Pos	Team	Pld	W	L	PF	PA	PD	PCT	Qualification	(Egypt)	(Madagascar)	(Tunisia)	(Rwanda)
1	Egypt	3	3	0	38	23	+15	1.000	Semifinal	—	21–13	17–10	w-0(f)
2	Madagascar	3	2	1	31	37	−6	.667	Play-in		—	18–16	w-0(f)
3	Tunisia	3	1	2	26	35	−9	.333	Play-in			—	w-0(f)
4	Rwanda	3	0	3	0	0	0	.000					—

Source: FIBA
Rules for classification: 1) Wins; 2) Head-to-head record; 3) Points scored; 4) Higher seed.

w = win, f = forfeit

==== Pool B ====
Pos	Team	Pld	W	L	PF	PA	PD	PCT	Qualification	(Democratic Republic of the Congo)	(Morocco)	(Kenya)	(Benin)
1	DR Congo	3	3	0	50	36	+14	1.000	Semifinal	—	17–10	14–12	19–14
2	Morocco	3	2	1	39	38	+1	.667	Play-in		—	17–11	12–10
3	Kenya	3	1	2	36	42	−6	.333	Play-in			—	13–11
4	Benin	3	0	3	35	44	−9	.000					—

Source: FIBA
Rules for classification: 1) Wins; 2) Head-to-head record; 3) Points scored; 4) Higher seed.

=== Knockout stage ===
All times are local.

Quarter-finals
4 Dec 2022 – 16:00
Morocco	9
Tunisia	12
4 Dec 2022 – 16:25
Madagascar	15
Kenya	14

Semi-finals
4 Dec 2022 – 17:50
Egypt	21
Tunisia	3
4 Dec 2022 – 18:15
Madagascar	16
DR Congo	13

Final
4 Dec 2022 – 20:30
Egypt	21
Madagascar	11
Bronze medal
4 Dec 2022 – 19:40
Tunisia	13
DR Congo	19

=== Final standings ===
Pos	Team	Pld	W	L	PF
1	Egypt	5	5	0	80
2	Madagascar	6	4	2	73
3	DR Congo	5	4	1	82
4	Tunisia	6	2	4	54
5	Morocco	4	2	2	47
6	Kenya	4	1	3	50
7	Benin	3	0	3	35
8	Rwanda	3	0	3	0
