= 2024 FIBA 3x3 Africa Cup – Women's tournament =

Tournament details
- Host country: Madagascar
- City: Antananarivo
- Dates: 29 November – 1 December
- Teams: 7

Final positions
- Champions: Madagascar (1st title)
- Runners-up: Egypt
- Third place: Kenya
- Fourth place: Benin

Tournament statistics
- MVP: (Madagascar) Minaoharisoa Jaofera

The 2024 FIBA 3x3 Africa Cup – Women's tournament is the sixth edition of this continental championship. The event was held in Antananarivo, Madagascar. It was contested by 7 teams.

Madagascar won their first title with a win over Egypt in the final.

== Host selection ==
Madagascar's capital, Antananarivo, was given the hosting rights in November 2024.

== Participating teams ==
All African National Federations were invited to register a team for the FIBA 3x3 Africa Cup 2024.

Pool A

- Egypt (1)
- Uganda (4)
- Madagascar (5) (hosts)

Pool B

- Kenya (2)
- Benin (3)
- Comoros (6)
- Rwanda (7)

== Venue ==
The venue is in the Mahamasina Sports and Culture Palace.

== Preliminary round ==
=== Pool A ===
Pos	Team	Pld	W	L	PF	PA	PD	Qualification	(Madagascar)	(Egypt)	(Uganda)
1	Madagascar (H)	2	2	0	39	31	+8	Semi-finals			
2	Egypt	2	1	1	38	31	+7	Semi-finals	17–18		21–13
3	Uganda	2	0	2	27	42	−15		14–21		

Source: FIBA
Rules for classification: 1) Wins; 2) Head-to-head record; 3) Points scored.
(H) Hosts

=== Pool B ===
Pos	Team	Pld	W	L	PF	PA	PD	Qualification	(Kenya)	(Benin)	(Rwanda)	(Comoros)
1	Kenya	3	3	0	47	37	+10	Semi-finals		10–12	21–15	
2	Benin	3	2	1	46	37	+9	Semi-finals			17–10	18–17 OT
3	Rwanda	3	1	2	46	47	−1					21–9
4	Comoros	3	0	3	36	54	−18		10–15			

Source: FIBA
Rules for classification: 1) Wins; 2) Head-to-head record; 3) Points scored.

== Knockout stage ==
All times are local.

Semi-finals
1 Dec 2024 – 16:00
Madagascar	16
Kenya	15
1 Dec 2024 – 16:25
Benin	10
Egypt	15

Final
1 Dec 2024 – 18:40
Madagascar	20
Egypt	15
Bronze medal
1 Dec 2024 – 17:45
Kenya	20
Benin	11

== Final standings ==
Pos	Team	Pld	W	L	W%	PF	PA
1	Madagascar	5	4	0	100%	75	18.8
2	Egypt	5	2	2	50%	68	17.0
3	Kenya	5	3	2	60%	81	16.2
4	Benin	5	3	2	60%	68	13.6
5	Rwanda	3	1	2	33%	46	15.3
6	Uganda	3	0	2	0%	27	13.5
7	Comoros	3	0	3	0%	36	12.0

== Awards ==
Team of the tournament
(Madagascar) Minaoharisoa Jaofera	(Egypt) Habiba Mohamed	(Kenya) Christine Akinyi
Most valuable player
(Madagascar) Minaoharisoa Jaofera
Top scorer
(Benin) Aishatou Kondoh Sobabe (31 points)

== See also ==
- 2024 FIBA 3x3 Africa Cup – Men's tournament
- 2024 FIBA 3x3 Europe Cup – Men's tournament
- 2024 FIBA 3x3 Europe Cup – Women's tournament
- Basketball at the 2024 Summer Olympics – Men's 3x3 tournament
- Basketball at the 2024 Summer Olympics – Women's 3x3 tournament
- 2024 FIBA 3x3 AmeriCup – Men's tournament
- 2024 FIBA 3x3 AmeriCup – Women's tournament
- 2024 FIBA 3x3 Asia Cup – Men's tournament
- 2024 FIBA 3x3 Asia Cup – Women's tournament
