= 2025 FIBA 3x3 Africa Cup =

2025 FIBA 3x3 Africa Cup consists of two sections:

- 2025 FIBA 3x3 Africa Cup – Men's tournament
- 2025 FIBA 3x3 Africa Cup – Women's tournament
