= FIBA 3x3 Africa Cup =

Basketball event

- Current season, competition or edition: 2025 FIBA 3x3 Africa Cup
- Sport: 3x3 basketball
- Founded: 2017
- No. of teams: 10 by gender
- Country: FIBA Africa members
- Continent: Africa
- Most recent champions: M: Madagascar (3rd title); W: Madagascar (2nd title)
- Most titles: M: Madagascar (3 titles); W: Egypt & Mali & Madagascar (2 titles each)

The FIBA 3x3 Africa Cup had its inaugural tournament in 2017 in Lomé, Togo. There are three events in this tournament: men's tournament, women's tournament, and shoot-out contest.

== Men ==
=== Results ===
Year	Host	Final			Third place match		
Year	Host	Champion	Score	Second place	Third place	Score	Fourth place
2017; Details	(Togo); Lomé	Nigeria	21–9	Ivory Coast	Madagascar	18–17	Egypt
2018; Details	(Togo); Lomé	Ivory Coast	14–6	Uganda	Nigeria	21–19	DR Congo
2019; Details	(Uganda); Kampala	Egypt	21–12	DR Congo	Mali	19–17	Madagascar
2022; Details	(Egypt); Cairo	Madagascar	20–17	Egypt	Rwanda	21–17	Tunisia
2023; Details	(Egypt); Cairo	Egypt	18–15	Nigeria	Madagascar	20–16	Algeria
2024; Details	(Madagascar); Antananarivo	Madagascar	22–3	Rwanda	Algeria	18–15	Benin
2025; Details	(Madagascar); Antananarivo	Madagascar	21–20	Egypt	Rwanda	21–13	Algeria
2026; Details	(Madagascar); Antananarivo						
2027; Details	(Madagascar); Antananarivo						

=== Medal table ===
Rank	Nation	Gold	Silver	Bronze	Total
1	Madagascar	3	0	2	5
2	Egypt	2	2	0	4
3	Nigeria	1	1	1	3
4	Ivory Coast	1	1	0	2
5	Rwanda	0	1	2	3
6	DR Congo	0	1	0	1
6	Uganda	0	1	0	1
8	Algeria	0	0	1	1
8	Mali	0	0	1	1
Totals (9 entries)		7	7	7	21

=== Participating teams ===
Nation	(Togo) 2017	(Togo) 2018	(Uganda) 2019	(Egypt) 2022	(Egypt) 2023	(Madagascar) 2024	(Madagascar) 2025	Years
Algeria					4th	3rd	4th	3
Benin	7th	12th	10th		5th	4th	9th	6
Botswana			8th	7th			11th	4
Burkina Faso		9th						1
Burundi			11th					1
Cape Verde		10th						1
Central African Republic						8th		1
DR Congo		4th	2nd	5th			8th	4
Egypt	4th	6th	1st	2nd	1st	10th	2nd	7
Gambia	12th							1
Ghana	9th							1
Ivory Coast	2nd	1st						2
Kenya			6th	8th	6th	5th	7th	5
Madagascar	3rd	8th	4th	1st	3rd	1st	1st	7
Mali	6th	5th	3rd					3
Mauritania	10th	11th				6th		3
Mauritius			12th					1
Morocco				6th	8th			2
Niger	11th		9th					2
Nigeria	1st	3rd	7th		2nd			4
Rwanda				3rd		2nd	3rd	3
Seychelles						7th	10th	2
Togo	5th	7th						2
Tunisia				4th			6th	2
Uganda	8th	2nd	5th		7th	9th	12th	6
Zambia							5th	1
Total	12	12	12	8	8	10	12	

== Women ==
=== Results ===
Year	Host	Final			Third place match		
Year	Host	Champion	Score	Second place	Third place	Score	Fourth place
2017; Details	(Togo); Lomé	Mali	12–11	Nigeria	Uganda	16–13	Ivory Coast
2018; Details	(Togo); Lomé	Mali	19–13	DR Congo	Togo	19–17	Nigeria
2019; Details	(Uganda); Kampala	Egypt	18–15	Mali	Uganda	21–15	Nigeria
2022; Details	(Egypt); Cairo	Egypt	21–11	Madagascar	DR Congo	19–13	Tunisia
2023; Details	(Egypt); Cairo	Kenya	21–20	Egypt	Madagascar	19–17	Uganda
2024; Details	(Madagascar); Antananarivo	Madagascar	20–15	Egypt	Kenya	20–11	Benin
2025; Details	(Madagascar); Antananarivo	Madagascar	17–16	Egypt	Kenya	14–11	Rwanda
2026; Details	(Madagascar); Antananarivo						
2027; Details	(Madagascar); Antananarivo						

=== Medal table ===
Rank	Nation	Gold	Silver	Bronze	Total
1	Egypt	2	3	0	5
2	Madagascar	2	1	1	4
3	Mali	2	1	0	3
4	Kenya	1	0	2	3
5	DR Congo	0	1	1	2
6	Nigeria	0	1	0	1
7	Uganda	0	0	2	2
8	Togo	0	0	1	1
Totals (8 entries)		7	7	7	21

=== Participating teams ===
Nation	(Togo) 2017	(Togo) 2018	(Uganda) 2019	(Egypt) 2022	(Egypt) 2023	(Madagascar) 2024	(Madagascar) 2025	Years
Algeria					6th			1
Benin		6th	8th	7th	7th	4th	7th	6
Botswana			6th				10th	2
Burkina Faso		11th						1
Burundi			7th					1
Cape Verde		8th						1
Comoros						7th	6th	2
Djibouti			10th					1
DR Congo		2nd		3rd			8th	3
Egypt	5th	9th	1st	1st	2nd	2nd	2nd	7
Gambia	10th							1
Ghana	6th	12th						2
Ivory Coast	4th	10th						2
Kenya			5th	6th	1st	3rd	3rd	5
Madagascar				2nd	3rd	1st	1st	4
Mali	1st	1st	2nd					3
Mauritania	9th							1
Mauritius			9th					1
Morocco				5th	5th			2
Niger	8th	7th						2
Nigeria	2nd	4th	4th					3
Rwanda				8th		5th	4th	3
Togo	6th	3rd						2
Tunisia				4th			5th	2
Uganda	3rd	5th	3rd		4th	6th	9th	6
Total	10	12	10	8	7	7	10	

== Overall medal table ==
Rank	Nation	Gold	Silver	Bronze	Total
1	Madagascar (MAD)	5	1	3	9
2	Egypt (EGY)	4	5	0	9
3	Mali (MLI)	2	1	1	4
4	Nigeria (NGR)	1	2	1	4
5	Ivory Coast (CIV)	1	1	0	2
6	Kenya (KEN)	1	0	2	3
7	DR Congo (COD)	0	2	1	3
8	Rwanda (RWA)	0	1	2	3
8	Uganda (UGA)	0	1	2	3
10	Algeria (ALG)	0	0	1	1
10	Togo (TOG)	0	0	1	1
Totals (11 entries)		14	14	14	42

== See also ==
- FIBA 3x3 U17 Africa Cup
