= 2025 FIBA 3x3 Africa Cup – Men's tournament =

Tournament details
- Host country: Madagascar
- City: Antananarivo
- Dates: 5–7 December
- Teams: 14

Final positions
- Champions: Madagascar (3rd title)
- Runners-up: Egypt
- Third place: Rwanda
- Fourth place: Algeria

Tournament statistics
- MVP: (Madagascar) Elly Randriamampionona

The 2025 FIBA 3x3 Africa Cup was the seventh edition of this continental championship. For the second consecutive time the event was held in Antananarivo, Madagascar, from 5 to 7 December 2025.

== Host selection ==
Madagascar's capital, Antananarivo, was given the hosting rights in November 2025.

== Venue ==
The venue was in the Mahamasina Sports and Culture Palace.

== Participating teams ==
All African National Federations were invited to register a team.

Preliminary round

Pool A

- Algeria (1)
- DR Congo (8)
- Seychelles (9)

Pool B

- Benin (2)
- Kenya (7)
- Zambia (10)

Pool C

- Uganda (3)
- Egypt (6)
- Tunisia (11)

Pool D

- Madagascar (4)
- Rwanda (5)
- Qualifier

Qualifying draw

Pool A

- Botswana (12)
- Comoros (13)
- Somalia (14)

== Qualifying draw ==
The group winner qualified for the next round.

=== Pool QD A ===
Pos	Team	Pld	W	L	PF	PA	PD	Qualification	(Botswana)	(Comoros)	(Somalia)
1	Botswana	2	2	0	42	28	+14	Preliminary round		22–11	20–17
2	Comoros	2	1	1	32	28	+4				21–6
3	Somalia	2	0	2	23	41	−18				

Source: FIBA
Rules for classification: 1) Wins; 2) Head-to-head record; 3) Points scored.

== Preliminary round ==
=== Pool A ===
Pos	Team	Pld	W	L	PF	PA	PD	Qualification	(Algeria)	(Democratic Republic of the Congo)	(Seychelles)
1	Algeria	2	2	0	42	26	+16	Knockout stage		21–8	21–18
2	DR Congo	2	1	1	30	33	−3	Knockout stage			22–12
3	Seychelles	2	0	2	30	43	−13				

Source: FIBA
Rules for classification: 1) Wins; 2) Head-to-head record; 3) Points scored.

=== Pool B ===
Pos	Team	Pld	W	L	PF	PA	PD	Qualification	(Zambia)	(Kenya)	(Benin)
1	Zambia	2	1	1	39	37	+2	Knockout stage			
2	Kenya	2	1	1	31	29	+2	Knockout stage	21–18		
3	Benin	2	1	1	27	31	−4		16–21	11–10	

Source: FIBA
Rules for classification: 1) Wins; 2) Head-to-head record; 3) Points scored.

=== Pool C ===
Pos	Team	Pld	W	L	PF	PA	PD	Qualification	(Egypt)	(Tunisia)	(Uganda)
1	Egypt	2	2	0	40	22	+18	Knockout stage		21–10	
2	Tunisia	2	1	1	31	37	−6	Knockout stage			
3	Uganda	2	0	2	28	40	−12		12–19	16–21	

Source: FIBA
Rules for classification: 1) Wins; 2) Head-to-head record; 3) Points scored.

=== Pool D ===
Pos	Team	Pld	W	L	PF	PA	PD	Qualification	(Madagascar)	(Rwanda)	(Botswana)
1	Madagascar (H)	2	2	0	39	31	+8	Knockout stage		21–18	18–13
2	Rwanda	2	1	1	40	38	+2	Knockout stage			22–17
3	Botswana	2	0	2	30	40	−10				

Source: FIBA
Rules for classification: 1) Wins; 2) Head-to-head record; 3) Points scored.
(H) Hosts

== Knockout stage ==
Quarter-finals
7 December
Algeria	21
Tunisia	11
7 December
Madagascar	21
Kenya	10
7 December
Zambia	13
Rwanda	21
7 December
Egypt	14
DR Congo	12

Semi-finals
7 December
Algeria	14
Madagascar	21
7 December
Rwanda	12
Egypt	22

Final
7 December
Madagascar	21
Egypt	20
Third place
7 December
Algeria	13
Rwanda	21

== Final ranking ==
Pos	Team	Pld	W	L	W%	PF	PA
1st place, gold medalist(s)	Madagascar	5	5	0	100%	102	20.4
2nd place, silver medalist(s)	Egypt	5	4	1	80%	95	19.0
3rd place, bronze medalist(s)	Rwanda	5	3	2	60%	93	18.6
4	Algeria	5	3	2	60%	90	18.0
5	Zambia	3	1	2	33%	52	17.3
6	Tunisia	3	1	2	33%	42	14.0
7	Kenya	3	1	2	33%	41	13.7
8	DR Congo	3	1	2	33%	41	13.7
9	Benin	2	1	1	50%	27	13.5
10	Seychelles	2	0	2	0%	30	15.0
11	Botswana	2	0	2	0%	30	15.0
12	Uganda	2	0	2	0%	28	14.0
Eliminated in qualifying draw
13	Comoros	2	1	1	50%	32	16.0
14	Somalia	2	0	2	0%	23	11.5

== See also ==
- 2025 FIBA 3x3 Africa Cup – Women's tournament
- 2025 FIBA 3x3 Europe Cup – Men's tournament
- 2025 FIBA 3x3 Europe Cup – Women's tournament
- 2025 FIBA 3x3 AmeriCup – Men's tournament
- 2025 FIBA 3x3 AmeriCup – Women's tournament
- 2025 FIBA 3x3 Asia Cup – Men's tournament
- 2025 FIBA 3x3 Asia Cup – Women's tournament
