= Serbia women's national 3x3 team =

Serbian basketball team

Serbia
- FIBA zone: FIBA Europe
- National federation: KSS

World Championships
- Appearances: None

Europe Championships
- Appearances: 3
- Medals: None

European Games
- Appearances: 1
- Medals: None
Home	Away

The Serbian women's national 3x3 team (Serbian: Женска репрезентација Србије у баскету / Ženska reprezentacija Srbije u basketu) represents Serbia in international 3x3 basketball matches and is controlled by the Basketball Federation of Serbia.

== Competitions ==
=== Summer Olympics ===
Year	Position	Pld	W	L	Players
(Japan) 2020 Tokyo	did not qualify				—N/a
(France) 2024 Paris	did not qualify				—N/a
Total	0/2	0	0	0	

=== 3x3 World Cup ===
Year	Position	Pld	W	L	Players
2012 Greece	did not qualify				—N/a
2014 Russia	did not qualify				—N/a
2016 China	did not qualify				—N/a
2017 France	did not qualify				—N/a
2018 Philippines	did not qualify				—N/a
2019 Netherlands	did not qualify				—N/a
2022 Belgium	did not qualify				—N/a
2023 Austria	did not qualify				—N/a
2025 Mongolia	did not qualify				—N/a
2026 Poland	did not qualify				—N/a
2027 Singapore	to be determined				
Total	0/11	0	0	0	

=== 3x3 Europe Cup ===
Year	Position	Pld	W	L	Players
2014 Romania	did not qualify				—N/a
2016 Romania	7th	3	1	2	Beronja, Bučevac, Maksimović, Vukoje
2017 Netherlands	8th	3	1	2	Maksimović, Pešović, Radović, Škorić
2018 Romania	12th	2	0	2	Beronja, Karakašević, Marković, Pešović
2019 Hungary	did not qualify				—N/a
2021 France	did not qualify				—N/a
2022 Austria	did not qualify				—N/a
2023 Israel	did not qualify				—N/a
2024 Austria	did not qualify				—N/a
2025 Denmark	did not qualify				—N/a
2026 Belgium	did not qualify				—N/a
Total	3/11	8	2	6	

=== European Games ===
Year	Position	Pld	W	L	Players
(Azerbaijan) 2015 Baku	did not qualify				—N/a
(Belarus) 2019 Minsk	10th	3	2	1	Beronja, Gobeljić, Karakašević, Rajić
(Poland) 2023 Kraków	did not qualify				—N/a
Total	1/3	3	2	1	

=== Mediterranean Games ===
Year	Position	Pld	W	L	Players
(Spain) 2018 Tarragona	4th	5	1	4	Ćorda, Spasojević, Stevanović, Vojinović
(Algeria) 2022 Oran	7th	5	3	2	Tešić, Radulović, Jelić, Curaković
(Italy) 2026 Taranto	did not participate				
Total	2/3	10	4	6	

== See also ==
- Serbia men's national 3x3 team
- Serbia women's national basketball team
