= 2024 FIBA 3x3 Africa Cup – Men's tournament =

Tournament details
- Host country: Madagascar
- City: Antananarivo
- Dates: 29 November – 1 December
- Teams: 10

Final positions
- Champions: Madagascar (2nd title)
- Runners-up: Rwanda
- Third place: Algeria
- Fourth place: Benin

Tournament statistics
- MVP: (Madagascar) Livio Ratianarivo

The 2024 FIBA 3x3 Africa Cup – Men's tournament is the sixth edition of this continental championship. The event was held in Antananarivo, Madagascar. It was contested by 10 teams.

Madagascar won their second title with a win over Rwanda in the final.

== Host selection ==
Madagascar's capital, Antananarivo, was given the hosting rights in November 2024.

== Participating teams ==
All African National Federations were invited to register a team for the FIBA 3x3 Africa Cup 2024.

Pool A

- Egypt (1)
- Algeria (4)
- Kenya (5)
- Rwanda (8)
- Central African Republic (9)

Pool B

- Benin (2)
- Madagascar (3) (hosts)
- Uganda (6)
- Mauritania (7)
- Seychelles (10)

== Venue ==
The venue is in the Mahamasina Sports and Culture Palace.

== Preliminary round ==
=== Pool A ===
Pos	Team	Pld	W	L	PF	PA	PD	Qualification	(Rwanda)	(Algeria)	(Kenya)	(Central African Republic)	(Egypt)
1	Rwanda	4	4	0	84	68	+16	Semi-finals		21–20		21–19	
2	Algeria	4	3	1	83	52	+31	Semi-finals			21–15	21–4	
3	Kenya	4	2	2	73	76	−3		16–21				21–20
4	Central African Republic	4	1	3	55	75	−20				14–21		18–12
5	Egypt	4	0	4	57	81	−24		13–21	12–21			

Source: FIBA
Rules for classification: 1) Wins; 2) Head-to-head record; 3) Points scored.

=== Pool B ===
Pos	Team	Pld	W	L	PF	PA	PD	Qualification	(Madagascar)	(Benin)	(Mauritania)	(Seychelles)	(Uganda)
1	Madagascar (H)	4	4	0	81	49	+32	Semi-finals				21–17	21–9
2	Benin	4	2 (Note: Benin 18–17 Mauritania)	2	63	65	−2	Semi-finals	15–19		18–17 OT		
3	Mauritania	4	2	2	65	72	−7		8–20			22–19	
4	Seychelles	4	1 (Note: Seychelles 17–15 Uganda)	3	69	80	−11			16–22			17–15
5	Uganda	4	1	3	52	64	−12			13–8	15–18		

Source: FIBA
Rules for classification: 1) Wins; 2) Head-to-head record; 3) Points scored.
(H) Hosts

== Knockout stage ==
All times are local.

Semi-finals
1 Dec 2024 – 16:50
Rwanda	21
Benin	14
1 Dec 2024 – 17:15
Madagascar	20
Algeria	18

Final
1 Dec 2024 – 19:05
Madagascar	22
Rwanda	3
Bronze medal
1 Dec 2024 – 18:10
Benin	15
Algeria	18

== Final standings ==
Pos	Team	Pld	W	L	W%	PF	PA
1	Madagascar	6	6	0	100%	122	20.3
2	Rwanda	6	5	1	83%	108	18.0
3	Algeria	6	4	2	67%	119	19.8
4	Benin	6	2	4	33%	91	15.2
5	Kenya	4	2	2	50%	73	18.3
6	Mauritania	4	2	2	50%	64	16.0
7	Seychelles	4	1	3	25%	69	17.3
8	Central African Republic	4	1	3	25%	55	13.8
9	Uganda	4	1	3	25%	52	13.0
10	Egypt	4	0	4	0%	57	14.3

== Awards ==
Team of the tournament
(Madagascar) Livio Ratianarivo	(Rwanda) Olivier Turatsinze	(Algeria) Chakib Sedoud
Most valuable player
(Madagascar) Livio Ratianarivo
Top scorer
(Madagascar) Livio Ratianarivo (53 points)

== See also ==
- 2024 FIBA 3x3 Africa Cup – Women's tournament
- 2024 FIBA 3x3 Europe Cup – Men's tournament
- 2024 FIBA 3x3 Europe Cup – Women's tournament
- Basketball at the 2024 Summer Olympics – Men's 3x3 tournament
- Basketball at the 2024 Summer Olympics – Women's 3x3 tournament
- 2024 FIBA 3x3 AmeriCup – Men's tournament
- 2024 FIBA 3x3 AmeriCup – Women's tournament
- 2024 FIBA 3x3 Asia Cup – Men's tournament
- 2024 FIBA 3x3 Asia Cup – Women's tournament
