= Tunisia women's national 3x3 team =

National 3x3 basketball team

Tunisia
- FIBA ranking: 17
- Joined FIBA: 1956
- FIBA zone: FIBA Africa
- National federation: FTBB
- Nickname(s): نسور قرطاج (Eagles of Carthage)

FIBA 3x3 World Cup
- Appearances: 1 (2014)
- Medals: None

FIBA 3x3 Africa Cup
- Appearances: 1 (2022)
- Medals: None

African Beach Games
- Appearances: 1 (2023)
- Medals: Bronze (bronze) : (2023)

Pan Arab Games
- Appearances: 1
- Medals: Gold (gold) : (2023)
Home	Away
Medal record
Representing Tunisia
Women's 3x3 basketball
African Beach Games
Bronze medal – third place	2023
Pan Arab Games
Gold medal – first place	2023

The Tunisia women's national 3x3 team, nicknamed Les Aigles de Carthage (The Eagles of Carthage or The Carthage Eagles), is a national basketball team of Tunisia, administered by the Tunisia Basketball Federation (FTBB). (Arabic: الجامعة التونسية لكرة السلة)

It represents the country in international 3x3 women's (3 against 3) basketball competitions.

== Competitions ==
=== Performance at Summer Olympics ===
Year	Position	Pld	W	L	Players
(Japan) 2020 Tokyo	Did not enter				—N/a
(France) 2024 Paris	Did not qualify				—N/a
Total					

=== Performance at World Cup ===
Year	Pos	Pld	W	L	Players
(Greece) 2012	Did not enter				
(Russia) 2014	17th				
(China) 2016	Did not enter				
(France) 2017	Did not enter				
(Philippines) 2018	Did not enter				
(Netherlands) 2019	Did not enter				
(Belgium) 2022	Did not enter				
(Austria) 2023	Did not enter				
(Mongolia) 2025	Did not enter				
(Poland) 2026	To be determined				
(Singapore) 2027	To be determined				
Total	1/11	5	0	5	

=== Performance at Africa Cup ===
Year	Pos	Pld	W	L	Players
(Togo) 2017	Did not participate				
(Togo) 2018	Did not participate				
(Uganda) 2019	Did not participate				
(Egypt) 2022	4th	6	2	4	
Total	1/4	6	2	4	

=== Performance at African Beach Games ===
Year	Pos	Pld	W	L	Players
(Cape Verde) 2019	Did not participate				
(Tunisia) 2023	3rd (bronze)				
Total	1/2	0	0	0	

=== Performance at Mediterranean Games ===
Year	Pos	Pld	W	L	Players
(Spain) 2018	Did not enter				
(Algeria) 2022	6th	6	2	4	
Total	1/2	6	2	4	

=== Performance at Pan Arab Games ===
Year	Pos	Pld	W	L	Players
(Algeria) 2023	1st (gold)				
Total	1/1				

== See also ==
- Tunisia women's national basketball team
- Tunisia national 3x3 team
- Tunisia women's national under-23 3x3 team
- Tunisia women's national under-18 3x3 team
