= 2019 FIBA 3x3 Africa Cup =

The 2019 FIBA 3x3 Africa Cup was the third edition of the African 3x3 basketball event which was held between 8 and 10 November 2019 in Kampala, Uganda. The Lugogo Hockey Pitch was the official venue of the competition.

== Participating teams ==
=== Men's ===
Pool A

- Niger (1)
- Botswana (7)
- Kenya (8)

Pool B

- Egypt (2)
- Mali (6)
- Benin (9)

Pool C

- Madagascar (3)
- Burundi (10)
- DR Congo (12)

Pool D

- Uganda (4)
- Nigeria (5)
- Mauritius (11)

=== Women's ===
Pool A

- Uganda (1)
- Nigeria (4)
- Kenya (5)

Draw A

- Djibouti (8)
- Mauritius (9)
- Burundi (10)

Pool B

- Mali (2)
- Egypt (3)
- Benin (6)
- Botswana (7)

== Men's tournament ==
=== Pool stage ===
==== Pool A ====
Pos	Team	Pld	W	L	PF	PA	PD	PCT	Qualification	(Kenya)	(Botswana)	(Niger)
1	Kenya	2	1	1	34	33	+1	.500	Knockout stage	—	21–19	13–14
2	Botswana	2	1	1	32	29	+3	.500	Knockout stage		—	13–8
3	Niger	2	1	1	22	26	−4	.500				—

Source: FIBA
Rules for classification: 1) Wins; 2) Head-to-head record; 3) Points scored; 4) Higher seed.

==== Pool B ====
Pos	Team	Pld	W	L	PF	PA	PD	PCT	Qualification	(Egypt)	(Mali)	(Benin)
1	Egypt	2	2	0	42	32	+10	1.000	Knockout stage	—	21–17	21–15
2	Mali	2	1	1	38	33	+5	.500	Knockout stage		—	21–12
3	Benin	2	0	2	27	42	−15	.000				—

Source: FIBA
Rules for classification: 1) Wins; 2) Head-to-head record; 3) Points scored; 4) Higher seed.

==== Pool C ====
Pos	Team	Pld	W	L	PF	PA	PD	PCT	Qualification	(Madagascar)	(Democratic Republic of the Congo)	(Burundi)
1	Madagascar	2	2	0	40	25	+15	1.000	Knockout stage	—	19–18	21–7
2	DR Congo	2	1	1	39	32	+7	.500	Knockout stage		—	21–13
3	Burundi	2	0	2	20	42	−22	.000				—

Source: FIBA
Rules for classification: 1) Wins; 2) Head-to-head record; 3) Points scored; 4) Higher seed.

==== Pool D ====
Pos	Team	Pld	W	L	PF	PA	PD	PCT	Qualification	(Uganda)	(Nigeria)	(Mauritius)
1	Uganda	2	2	0	36	19	+17	1.000	Knockout stage	—	15–14	21–5
2	Nigeria	2	1	1	32	30	+2	.500	Knockout stage		—	18–15
3	Mauritius	2	0	2	20	39	−19	.000				—

Source: FIBA
Rules for classification: 1) Wins; 2) Head-to-head record; 3) Points scored; 4) Higher seed.

=== Knockout stage ===
All times are local.

Quarter-finals
10 Nov 2019 – 15:45
Kenya	14
DR Congo	21
10 Nov 2019 – 16:05
Uganda	9
Mali	18
10 Nov 2019 – 16:25
Egypt	17
Nigeria	13
10 Nov 2019 – 16:45
Madagascar	13
Botswana	10

Semi-finals
10 Nov 2019 – 17:55
DR Congo	13
Mali	20
10 Nov 2019 – 18:15
Egypt	21
Madagascar	11

Final
10 Nov 2019 – 19:50
DR Congo	12
Egypt	21
Bronze medal
10 Nov 2019 – 19:05
Madagascar	17
Mali	19

=== Final standings ===
Pos	Team	Pld	W	L	PF
1	Egypt	5	5	0	101
2	DR Congo	5	3	2	88
3	Mali	5	3	2	86
4	Madagascar	5	3	2	81
5	Uganda	3	2	1	45
6	Kenya	3	1	2	48
7	Nigeria	3	1	2	45
8	Botswana	3	1	2	42
9	Niger	2	1	1	22
10	Benin	2	0	2	27
11	Burundi	2	0	2	20
12	Mauritius	2	0	2	20

== Women's tournament ==
=== Qualifying draw ===
Pos	Team	Pld	W	L	PF	PA	PD	PCT	Qualification	(Burundi)	(Mauritius)	(Djibouti)
1	Burundi	2	2	0	42	17	+25	1.000	Pool stage	—	21–15	21–2
2	Mauritius	2	1	1	37	24	+13	.500			—	22–3
3	Djibouti	2	0	2	5	43	−38	.000				—

Source: FIBA
Rules for classification: 1) Wins; 2) Head-to-head record; 3) Points scored; 4) Higher seed.

=== Pool stage ===
==== Pool A ====
Pos	Team	Pld	W	L	PF	PA	PD	PCT	Qualification	(Uganda)	(Nigeria)	(Kenya)	(Burundi)
1	Uganda	3	3	0	52	35	+17	1.000	Knockout stage	—	18–15	13–11	21–9
2	Nigeria	3	2	1	55	49	+6	.667	Knockout stage		—	21–20	19–11
3	Kenya	3	1	2	52	48	+4	.333				—	21–14
4	Burundi	3	0	3	34	61	−27	.000					—

Source: FIBA
Rules for classification: 1) Wins; 2) Head-to-head record; 3) Points scored; 4) Higher seed.

==== Pool B ====
Pos	Team	Pld	W	L	PF	PA	PD	PCT	Qualification	(Mali)	(Egypt)	(Botswana)	(Benin)
1	Mali	3	3	0	64	23	+41	1.000	Knockout stage	—	21–8	22–7	21–8
2	Egypt	3	2	1	50	44	+6	.667	Knockout stage		—	21–12	21–11
3	Botswana	3	1	2	32	52	−20	.333				—	13–9
4	Benin	3	0	3	28	55	−27	.000					—

Source: FIBA
Rules for classification: 1) Wins; 2) Head-to-head record; 3) Points scored; 4) Higher seed.

=== Knockout stage ===
All times are local.

Semi-finals
10 Nov 2019 – 17:15
Uganda	17
Egypt	21
10 Nov 2019 – 17:35
Mali	15
Nigeria	14

Final
10 Nov 2019 – 19:25
Egypt	18
Mali	15
Bronze medal
10 Nov 2019 – 19:05
Nigeria	15
Uganda	21

=== Final standings ===
Pos	Team	Pld	W	L	PF
1	Egypt	5	4	1	89
2	Mali	5	4	1	94
3	Uganda	5	4	1	90
4	Nigeria	5	2	3	84
5	Kenya	3	1	2	52
6	Botswana	3	1	2	32
7	Burundi	5	2	3	76
8	Benin	3	0	3	28
9	Mauritius	2	1	1	37
10	Djibouti	2	0	2	5
