= 2025 FIBA 3x3 AmeriCup – Men's tournament =

Tournament details
- Host country: Mexico
- City: León
- Dates: 27–30 November
- Teams: 20
- Venue: Templo Expiatorio

Final positions
- Champions: United States (4th title)
- Runners-up: Puerto Rico
- Third place: Brazil
- Fourth place: Canada

Tournament statistics
- MVP: (United States) Cameron Forte

The 2025 FIBA 3x3 AmeriCup – Men's tournament was the fifth edition of this continental championship. The event was held in León, Mexico from 27 to 30 November 2025. It was contested by 20 teams from all over the American continent.

The United States won their fourth title, after defeated Puerto Rico 21–15 in the final.

== Host selection ==
San Juan, Mexico was given the hosting rights on 6 June 2025, marking the first time this tournament will be hosted in the country.

== Venue ==
The event will be held in León, in front of the Templo Expiatorio.

== Participating teams ==
All National Federations in the Americas region were invited to register a team for the 2024 FIBA 3x3 AmeriCup.

Preliminary round

Pool A

- United States (1)
- Mexico (8)
- Cayman Islands (9)

Pool B

- Puerto Rico (2)
- Dominican Republic (7)
- Qualifier

Pool C

- Canada (3)
- Argentina (6)
- Qualifier

Pool D

- Chile (4)
- Brazil (5)
- Qualifier

Qualifying draw

Pool A

- Jamaica (10)
- Guyana (15)
- Saint Lucia (16)

Pool B

- Uruguay (11)
- Trinidad and Tobago (14)
- Saint Kitts and Nevis (17)
- Bahamas (20)

Pool C

- Venezuela (12)
- Haiti (13)
- Paraguay (18)
- Ecuador (19)

== Qualifying draw ==
The group winners qualified for the next round.

=== Pool QD A ===
Pos	Team	Pld	W	L	PF	PA	PD	Qualification	(Jamaica)	(Guyana)	(Saint Lucia)
1	Jamaica	2	2	0	40	21	+19	Preliminary round		19–14	21–7
2	Guyana	2	1	1	31	34	−3				17–15
3	Saint Lucia	2	0	2	22	38	−16				

Source: FIBA
Rules for classification: 1) Wins; 2) Head-to-head record; 3) Points scored.

=== Pool QD B ===
Pos	Team	Pld	W	L	PF	PA	PD	Qualification	(Trinidad and Tobago)	(Uruguay)	(Saint Kitts and Nevis)	(The Bahamas)
1	Trinidad and Tobago	3	3	0	42	25	+17	Preliminary round			21–7	w/o
2	Uruguay	3	2	1	34	28	+6		18–21			w/o
3	Saint Kitts and Nevis	3	1	2	14	37	−23			7–16		
4	Bahamas	3	0	3	0	0	0				w/o	

Source: FIBA
Rules for classification: 1) Wins; 2) Head-to-head record; 3) Points scored.

=== Pool QD C ===
Pos	Team	Pld	W	L	PF	PA	PD	Qualification	(Ecuador)	(Venezuela)	(Paraguay)	(Haiti)
1	Ecuador	3	2 (Note: Venezuela 18–20 Ecuador)	1	53	51	+2	Preliminary round			18–17	
2	Venezuela	3	2	1	58	51	+7		18–20			21–13
3	Paraguay	3	1 (Note: Haiti 15–19 Paraguay)	2	54	52	+2			18–19		
4	Haiti	3	1	2	44	55	−11		16–15		15–19	

Source: FIBA
Rules for classification: 1) Wins; 2) Head-to-head record; 3) Points scored.

== Preliminary round ==
=== Pool A ===
Pos	Team	Pld	W	L	PF	PA	PD	Qualification	(United States)	(Mexico)	(Cayman Islands)
1	United States	2	2	0	42	16	+26	Knockout stage		21–12	21–4
2	Mexico (H)	2	1	1	34	32	+2	Knockout stage			22–11
3	Cayman Islands	2	0	2	15	43	−28				

Source: FIBA
Rules for classification: 1) Wins; 2) Head-to-head record; 3) Points scored.
(H) Hosts

=== Pool B ===
Pos	Team	Pld	W	L	PF	PA	PD	Qualification	(Puerto Rico)	(Dominican Republic)	(Jamaica)
1	Puerto Rico	2	2	0	42	35	+7	Knockout stage		21–15	21–20
2	Dominican Republic	2	1	1	32	36	−4	Knockout stage			17–15
3	Jamaica	2	0	2	35	38	−3				

Source: FIBA
Rules for classification: 1) Wins; 2) Head-to-head record; 3) Points scored.

=== Pool C ===
Pos	Team	Pld	W	L	PF	PA	PD	Qualification	(Canada)	(Argentina)	(Trinidad and Tobago)
1	Canada	2	2	0	42	30	+12	Knockout stage		21–14	21–16
2	Argentina	2	1	1	35	38	−3	Knockout stage			21–17
3	Trinidad and Tobago	2	0	2	33	42	−9				

Source: FIBA
Rules for classification: 1) Wins; 2) Head-to-head record; 3) Points scored.

=== Pool D ===
Pos	Team	Pld	W	L	PF	PA	PD	Qualification	(Brazil)	(Chile)	(Ecuador)
1	Brazil	2	2	0	42	30	+12	Knockout stage			21–13
2	Chile	2	1	1	32	34	−2	Knockout stage	17–21		15–13
3	Ecuador	2	0	2	26	36	−10				

Source: FIBA
Rules for classification: 1) Wins; 2) Head-to-head record; 3) Points scored.

== Knockout stage ==
Quarter-finals
30 November
United States	21
Argentina	14
30 November
Brazil	18
Dominican Republic	12
30 November
Puerto Rico	21
Chile	18
30 November
Canada	21
Mexico	17

Semi-finals
30 November
United States	21
Brazil	8
30 November
Puerto Rico	19
Canada	17

Final
30 November
United States	21
Puerto Rico	15
Third place
30 November
Brazil	21
Canada	16

== Final ranking ==
Rank	Team	Record
1st place, gold medalist(s)	United States	5–0
2nd place, silver medalist(s)	Puerto Rico	4–1
3rd place, bronze medalist(s)	Brazil	4–1
4	Canada	3–2
5	Chile	1–2
6	Mexico	1–2
7	Argentina	1–2
8	Dominican Republic	1–2
9	Jamaica	0–2
10	Trinidad and Tobago	0–2
11	Ecuador	0–2
12	Cayman Islands	0–2
Eliminated in qualifying draw
13	Venezuela	2–1
14	Uruguay	2–1
15	Guyana	2–1
16	Paraguay	1–2
17	Haiti	1–2
18	Saint Kitts and Nevis	1–2
19	Saint Lucia	0–2
20	Bahamas	0–3

== See also ==
- 2025 FIBA 3x3 AmeriCup – Women's tournament
- 2025 FIBA 3x3 Europe Cup – Men's tournament
- 2025 FIBA 3x3 Europe Cup – Women's tournament
- 2025 FIBA 3x3 Asia Cup – Men's tournament
- 2025 FIBA 3x3 Asia Cup – Women's tournament
- 2025 FIBA 3x3 Africa Cup – Men's tournament
- 2025 FIBA 3x3 Africa Cup – Women's tournament
