= 2018 FIBA 3x3 Africa Cup =

The 2018 FIBA 3x3 Africa Cup was the second edition of the African 3x3 basketball event which was held between 9 and 11 November 2018 in Lomé, Togo. This event was staged in the covered outdoor venue of the Stade Omnisport Eyadema de Lomé. All African National Federations were invited to register a team for this event. Teams competed in two qualifiers in Benin and Madagascar to qualify for the event.

== Qualification ==
The teams participating in this event were selected by two qualifying tournaments: one in Madagascar, and the other in Benin. Madagascar Qualifier took place on July 28-29 in Antananarivo, Madagascar, and Benin Qualifier took place in Cotonou, Benin on August 16-17. Four men's teams and three women's teams qualified in the Madagascar Qualifier and seven men's teams and eight women's team qualified through Benin Qualifier.

== Participating teams ==
=== Men's ===
Pool A

- Egypt (1)
- Mali (10)
- Benin (12)

Pool B

- Ivory Coast (2)
- Mauritania (9)
- DR Congo (13)

Pool C

- Uganda (3)
- Nigeria (6)
- Cape Verde (15)

Pool D

- Togo (4)
- Madagascar (5)
- Burkina Faso (17)

=== Women's ===
Pool A

- Uganda (1)
- Ghana (9)
- Cape Verde (11)

Pool B

- Egypt (2)
- Nigeria (8)
- Benin (12)

Pool C

- Mali (4)
- Ivory Coast (7)
- DR Congo (13)

Pool D

- Togo (5)
- Niger (6)
- Burkina Faso (14)

== Men's tournament ==
=== Pool stage ===
==== Pool A ====
Pos	Team	Pld	W	L	PF	PA	PD	PCT	Qualification	(Mali)	(Egypt)	(Benin)
1	Mali	2	2	0	29	19	+10	1.000	Knockout stage	—	14–13	15–6
2	Egypt	2	1	1	27	27	0	.500	Knockout stage		—	14–13
3	Benin	2	0	2	19	29	−10	.000				—

Source: FIBA
Rules for classification: 1) Wins; 2) Head-to-head record; 3) Points scored; 4) Higher seed.

==== Pool B ====
Pos	Team	Pld	W	L	PF	PA	PD	PCT	Qualification	(Ivory Coast)	(Democratic Republic of the Congo)	(Mauritania)
1	Ivory Coast	2	2	0	29	23	+6	1.000	Knockout stage	—	14–10	15–13
2	DR Congo	2	1	1	26	28	−2	.500	Knockout stage		—	16–14
3	Mauritania	2	0	2	27	31	−4	.000				—

Source: FIBA
Rules for classification: 1) Wins; 2) Head-to-head record; 3) Points scored; 4) Higher seed.

==== Pool C ====
Pos	Team	Pld	W	L	PF	PA	PD	PCT	Qualification	(Nigeria)	(Uganda)	(Cape Verde)
1	Nigeria	2	2	0	39	21	+18	1.000	Knockout stage	—	22–5	17–16
2	Uganda	2	1	1	19	35	−16	.500	Knockout stage		—	14–13
3	Cape Verde	2	0	2	29	31	−2	.000				—

Source: FIBA
Rules for classification: 1) Wins; 2) Head-to-head record; 3) Points scored; 4) Higher seed.

==== Pool D ====
Pos	Team	Pld	W	L	PF	PA	PD	PCT	Qualification	(Madagascar)	(Togo)	(Burkina Faso)
1	Madagascar	2	1	1	32	23	+9	.500	Knockout stage	—		11–13
2	Togo	2	1	1	25	28	−3	.500	Knockout stage	10–21	—	15–7
3	Burkina Faso	2	1	1	20	26	−6	.500				—

Source: FIBA
Rules for classification: 1) Wins; 2) Head-to-head record; 3) Points scored; 4) Higher seed.

=== Knockout stage ===
All times are local.

Quarter-finals
11 Nov 2021 – 11:10
Mali	8
Uganda	9
11 Nov 2021 – 11:30
Madagascar	9
DR Congo	16
11 Nov 2021 – 12:50
Ivory Coast	17
Togo	16
11 Nov 2021 – 13:10
Nigeria	20
Egypt	16

Semi-finals
11 Nov 2021 – 14:40
Uganda	16
DR Congo	10
11 Nov 2021 – 15:05
Ivory Coast	14
Nigeria	10

Final
11 Nov 2021 – 17:05
Uganda	6
Ivory Coast	14
Bronze medal
11 Nov 2021 – 16:15
DR Congo	19
Nigeria	21

=== Final standings ===
Pos	Team	Pld	W	L	PF
1	Ivory Coast	5	5	0	74
2	Uganda	5	3	2	50
3	Nigeria	5	4	1	90
4	DR Congo	5	2	3	71
5	Mali	3	2	1	37
6	Egypt	3	1	2	43
7	Togo	3	1	2	41
8	Madagascar	3	1	2	41
9	Burkina Faso	2	1	1	20
10	Cape Verde	2	0	2	29
11	Mauritania	2	0	2	27
12	Benin	2	0	2	19

== Women's tournament ==
=== Pool stage ===
==== Pool A ====
Pos	Team	Pld	W	L	PF	PA	PD	PCT	Qualification	(Uganda)	(Cape Verde)	(Ghana)
1	Uganda	2	2	0	42	11	+31	1.000	Knockout stage	—	21–5	21–6
2	Cape Verde	2	1	1	22	34	−12	.500	Knockout stage		—	17–13
3	Ghana	2	0	2	19	38	−19	.000				—

Source: FIBA
Rules for classification: 1) Wins; 2) Head-to-head record; 3) Points scored; 4) Higher seed.

==== Pool B ====
Pos	Team	Pld	W	L	PF	PA	PD	PCT	Qualification	(Nigeria)	(Benin)	(Egypt)
1	Nigeria	2	2	0	37	30	+7	1.000	Knockout stage	—	17–12	20–18
2	Benin	2	1	1	33	37	−4	.500	Knockout stage		—	21–20
3	Egypt	2	0	2	38	41	−3	.000				—

Source: FIBA
Rules for classification: 1) Wins; 2) Head-to-head record; 3) Points scored; 4) Higher seed.

==== Pool C ====
Pos	Team	Pld	W	L	PF	PA	PD	PCT	Qualification	(Democratic Republic of the Congo)	(Mali)	(Ivory Coast)
1	DR Congo	2	2	0	29	24	+5	1.000	Knockout stage	—	15–14	14–10
2	Mali	2	1	1	29	26	+3	.500	Knockout stage		—	15–11
3	Ivory Coast	2	0	2	21	29	−8	.000				—

Source: FIBA
Rules for classification: 1) Wins; 2) Head-to-head record; 3) Points scored; 4) Higher seed.

==== Pool D ====
Pos	Team	Pld	W	L	PF	PA	PD	PCT	Qualification	(Togo)	(Niger)	(Burkina Faso)
1	Togo	2	2	0	33	13	+20	1.000	Knockout stage	—	16–7	17–6
2	Niger	2	1	1	26	30	−4	.500	Knockout stage		—	19–14
3	Burkina Faso	2	0	2	20	36	−16	.000				—

Source: FIBA
Rules for classification: 1) Wins; 2) Head-to-head record; 3) Points scored; 4) Higher seed.

=== Knockout stage ===
All times are local.

Quarter-finals
11 Nov 2018 – 10:30
Uganda	16
Mali	21
11 Nov 2018 – 10:50
Togo	12
Benin	9
11 Nov 2018 – 12:10
Nigeria	21
Niger	5
11 Nov 2018 – 12:30
DR Congo	21
Cape Verde	7

Semi-finals
11 Nov 2018 – 13:50
Mali	15
Togo	8
11 Nov 2018 – 14:15
Nigeria	16
DR Congo	18

Final
11 Nov 2018 – 16:40
Mali	19
DR Congo	13
Bronze medal
11 Nov 2018 – 15:50
Togo	19
Nigeria	17

=== Final standings ===
Pos	Team	Pld	W	L	PF
1	Mali	5	4	1	84
2	DR Congo	5	4	1	81
3	Togo	5	4	1	72
4	Nigeria	5	3	2	91
5	Uganda	3	2	1	58
6	Benin	3	1	2	42
7	Niger	3	1	2	31
8	Cape Verde	3	1	2	29
9	Egypt	2	0	2	38
10	Ivory Coast	2	0	2	21
11	Burkina Faso	2	0	2	20
12	Ghana	2	0	2	19

== Shoot-Out Contest ==
=== Format ===
One player from each men's and women's team participated. In the qualifiers, players throw ten shots from the top of the arc. Two male and two female players who score the most points are qualified for the final. In the final, each player try 18 shots from four locations: five from the top of the arc, ten from the left and right wings, and three from the 3x3 logo. Shots from the 3x3 logo is given two points while the others are worth one.

=== Results ===
N'Faly Kanoute of Mali won gold and Sara Ageno of Uganda won silver.

Pos	Team	Qualifier score	Final score
1	(Mali) N’Faly Kanoute	6	7
2	(Uganda) Sarah Ageno	6	3
3	(Egypt) Rana Abdelzaher	5	?
