= 2017 FIBA 3x3 Africa Cup =

The 2017 FIBA 3x3 Africa Cup was the inaugural edition of the African 3x3 basketball event which was held between 3 and 5 November 017 in Lomé, Togo. This tournament was held at the covered outdoor venue of the Stade Omnisport Eyadema de Lomé.

== Qualification ==
All African National Federations were invited to register a team for the FIBA 3x3 Africa Cup 2017.

== Men's tournament ==
=== Pool stage ===
==== Pool A ====
| Pos | Team | Pld | W | L | PF | PA | PD | PCT | Qualification | (Mali) | (Uganda) | (The Gambia) |
|---|---|---|---|---|---|---|---|---|---|---|---|---|
| 1 | Mali | 2 | 2 | 0 | 31 | 14 | +17 | 1.000 | Knockout stage | — | 18–7 | 13–7 |
| 2 | Uganda | 2 | 1 | 1 | 19 | 27 | −8 | .500 | Knockout stage | | — | 12–9 |
| 3 | Gambia | 2 | 0 | 2 | 16 | 25 | −9 | .000 | | | | — |

Source: FIBA
Rules for classification: 1) Wins; 2) Head-to-head record; 3) Points scored; 4) Higher seed.

==== Pool B ====
| Pos | Team | Pld | W | L | PF | PA | PD | PCT | Qualification | (Nigeria) | (Madagascar) | (Niger) |
|---|---|---|---|---|---|---|---|---|---|---|---|---|
| 1 | Nigeria | 2 | 2 | 0 | 43 | 26 | +17 | 1.000 | Knockout stage | — | 21–16 | 22–10 |
| 2 | Madagascar | 2 | 1 | 1 | 37 | 27 | +10 | .500 | Knockout stage | | — | 21–6 |
| 3 | Niger | 2 | 0 | 2 | 16 | 43 | −27 | .000 | | | | — |

Source: FIBA
Rules for classification: 1) Wins; 2) Head-to-head record; 3) Points scored; 4) Higher seed.

==== Pool C ====
| Pos | Team | Pld | W | L | PF | PA | PD | PCT | Qualification | (Egypt) | (Ivory Coast) | (Mauritania) |
|---|---|---|---|---|---|---|---|---|---|---|---|---|
| 1 | Egypt | 2 | 2 | 0 | 29 | 22 | +7 | 1.000 | Knockout stage | — | 13–9 | 16–13 |
| 2 | Ivory Coast | 2 | 1 | 1 | 27 | 18 | +9 | .500 | Knockout stage | | — | 18–5 |
| 3 | Mauritania | 2 | 0 | 2 | 18 | 34 | −16 | .000 | | | | — |

Source: FIBA
Rules for classification: 1) Wins; 2) Head-to-head record; 3) Points scored; 4) Higher seed.

==== Pool D ====
| Pos | Team | Pld | W | L | PF | PA | PD | PCT | Qualification | (Togo) | (Benin) | (Ghana) |
|---|---|---|---|---|---|---|---|---|---|---|---|---|
| 1 | Togo | 2 | 2 | 0 | 40 | 34 | +6 | 1.000 | Knockout stage | — | 20–19 | 20–15 |
| 2 | Benin | 2 | 1 | 1 | 38 | 34 | +4 | .500 | Knockout stage | | — | 19–14 |
| 3 | Ghana | 2 | 0 | 2 | 29 | 39 | −10 | .000 | | | | — |

Source: FIBA
Rules for classification: 1) Wins; 2) Head-to-head record; 3) Points scored; 4) Higher seed.

=== Knockout stage ===
All times are local.

Quarter-finals
05 Nov 2017 – 12:00
Mali | 13
Ivory Coast | 14
05 Nov 2017 – 12:20
Togo | 17
Madagascar | 21
05 Nov 2017 – 12:40
Nigeria | 21
Benin | 12
05 Nov 2017 – 13:00
Egypt | 21
Uganda | 16

Semi-finals
05 Nov 2017 – 14:20
Ivory Coast | 21
Madagascar | 16
05 Nov 2017 – 14:40
Nigeria | 21
Egypt | 14

Final
05 Nov 2017 – 16:20
Ivory Coast | 9
Nigeria | 21
Bronze medal
05 Nov 2017 – 15:40
Madagascar | 18
Egypt | 17

=== Final standings ===
| Pos | Team | Pld | W | L | PF |
|---|---|---|---|---|---|
| 1 | Nigeria | 5 | 5 | 0 | 106 |
| 2 | Ivory Coast | 5 | 3 | 2 | 71 |
| 3 | Madagascar | 5 | 3 | 2 | 92 |
| 4 | Egypt | 5 | 3 | 2 | 81 |
| 5 | Togo | 3 | 2 | 1 | 57 |
| 6 | Mali | 3 | 2 | 1 | 44 |
| 7 | Benin | 3 | 1 | 2 | 50 |
| 8 | Uganda | 3 | 1 | 2 | 35 |
| 9 | Ghana | 2 | 0 | 2 | 29 |
| 10 | Mauritania | 2 | 0 | 2 | 18 |
| 11 | Niger | 2 | 0 | 2 | 16 |
| 12 | Gambia | 2 | 0 | 2 | 16 |

== Women's tournament ==
=== Pool stage ===
==== Pool A ====
| Pos | Team | Pld | W | L | PF | PA | PD | PCT | Qualification | (Uganda) | (Ivory Coast) | (Ghana) | (Niger) | (The Gambia) |
|---|---|---|---|---|---|---|---|---|---|---|---|---|---|---|
| 1 | Uganda | 4 | 4 | 0 | 71 | 26 | +45 | 1.000 | Knockout stage | — | 12–10 | 21–8 | 17–5 | 21–3 |
| 2 | Ivory Coast | 4 | 3 | 1 | 46 | 30 | +16 | .750 | Knockout stage | | — | 17–12 | 8–4 | 11–2 |
| 3 | Ghana | 4 | 2 | 2 | 52 | 59 | −7 | .500 | | | | — | 15–13 | 17–8 |
| 4 | Niger | 4 | 1 | 3 | 42 | 43 | −1 | .250 | | | | | — | 20–3 |
| 5 | Gambia | 4 | 0 | 4 | 16 | 69 | −53 | .000 | | | | | | — |

Source: FIBA
Rules for classification: 1) Wins; 2) Head-to-head record; 3) Points scored; 4) Higher seed.

==== Pool B ====
| Pos | Team | Pld | W | L | PF | PA | PD | PCT | Qualification | (Mali) | (Nigeria) | (Egypt) | (Togo) | (Mauritania) |
|---|---|---|---|---|---|---|---|---|---|---|---|---|---|---|
| 1 | Mali | 4 | 4 | 0 | 64 | 32 | +32 | 1.000 | Knockout stage | — | 14–11 | 20–12 | 9–7 | 21–2 |
| 2 | Nigeria | 4 | 3 | 1 | 69 | 29 | +40 | .750 | Knockout stage | | — | 16–7 | 21–7 | 21–1 |
| 3 | Egypt | 4 | 2 | 2 | 58 | 62 | −4 | .500 | | | | — | 17–15 | 22–11 |
| 4 | Togo | 4 | 1 | 3 | 44 | 50 | −6 | .250 | | | | | — | 15–3 |
| 5 | Mauritania | 4 | 0 | 4 | 17 | 79 | −62 | .000 | | | | | | — |

Source: FIBA
Rules for classification: 1) Wins; 2) Head-to-head record; 3) Points scored; 4) Higher seed.

=== Knockout stage ===
All times are local.

Semi-finals
05 Nov 2017 – 13:40
Uganda | 7
Nigeria | 12
05 Nov 2017 – 14:00
Mali | 21
Ivory Coast | 12

Final
05 Nov 2017 – 16:00
Nigeria | 11
Mali | 12
Bronze medal
05 Nov 2017 – 15:20
Uganda | 16
Ivory Coast | 13

=== Final standings ===
| Pos | Team | Pld | W | L | PF |
|---|---|---|---|---|---|
| 1 | Mali | 6 | 6 | 0 | 97 |
| 2 | Nigeria | 6 | 4 | 2 | 92 |
| 3 | Uganda | 6 | 5 | 1 | 94 |
| 4 | Ivory Coast | 6 | 3 | 3 | 71 |
| 5 | Egypt | 4 | 2 | 2 | 58 |
| 6 | Ghana | 4 | 2 | 2 | 52 |
| 7 | Togo | 4 | 1 | 3 | 44 |
| 8 | Niger | 4 | 1 | 3 | 42 |
| 9 | Mauritania | 4 | 0 | 4 | 17 |
| 10 | Gambia | 4 | 0 | 4 | 16 |

== Shoot-Out Contest ==
The shoot-out contest was played on 5 November.

| Pos | Team | Score |
|---|---|---|
| 1 | (Madagascar) Elly Randriamampionona | 9 |
| 2 | (Mali) Mamadou Keita | 8 |
| 3 | (Ivory Coast) Fatoumata Kone | 7 |
