= Madagascar women's national 3x3 team =

National 3x3 basketball team

Madagascar
- FIBA zone: FIBA Africa

World Cup
- Appearances: 3

Africa Cup
- Appearances: 3
- Medals: (gold) Gold: (2024); (silver) Silver: (2022); (bronze) Bronze: (2023)

The Madagascar women's national 3x3 team is a national 3x3 basketball team of Madagascar, governed by the Fédération Malagasy de Basket-Ball. It represents the country in international 3x3 women's basketball competitions.

== Tournament record ==
=== World Cup ===
Year	Position	Pld	W	L
(Greece) 2012 Athens	Did not qualify			
(Russia) 2014 Moscow	Did not qualify			
(China) 2016 Guangzhou	Did not qualify			
(France) 2017 Nantes	Did not qualify			
(Philippines) 2018 Bocaue	Did not qualify			
(Netherlands) 2019 Amsterdam	Did not qualify			
(Belgium) 2022 Antwerp	Did not qualify			
(Austria) 2023 Vienna	Did not qualify			
(Mongolia) 2025 Ulaanbaatar	20th	4	0	4
(Poland) 2026 Warsaw	20th	4	0	4
2027 Singapore	To be determined			
Total	2/11	8	0	8

=== 3x3 Africa Cup ===
- 2022 – 2nd
- 2023 – 3rd
- 2024 – 1st

=== Champions Cup ===
Year	Position	Pld	W	L
(Thailand) 2025 Bangkok	8th	3	0	3
(Thailand) 2026 Bangkok	8th	3	0	3
Total	2/2	6	0	6

== See also ==
- Madagascar men's national 3x3 team
- Madagascar women's national basketball team
