= 3x3 basketball at the 2018 Mediterranean Games =

- Venue: Camp de Mart Auditorium
- Dates: 27–29 June
- Nations: 13
- Teams: 13 (men); 9 (women)

Champions
- Men: France
- Women: France

The 3x3 basketball tournament at the 2018 Mediterranean Games in Tarragona took place between 27 and 29 June. The men's tournament was held at the Camp de Mart Auditorium. A women's tournament was also organized, after it was cancelled in 2013 because too few teams applied.

== Medal summary ==
Event	Gold	Silver	Bronze
Men	France (FRA); Jim Seymour; Charly Pontens; Lucas Dussoulier; Tim Eboh	Italy (ITA); Riccardo Bolpin; Leonardo Totè; Federico Mussini; Vittorio Nobile	Slovenia (SLO); Dejan Trnjak; Stojan Đekanovič; Jan Novak; Milan Kovačevič
Women	France (FRA); Assitan Koné; Marie Mané; Victoria Majekodunmi; Caroline Hériaud	Spain (ESP); Laia Flores Costa; Marina Lizarazu Herrera; Nogaye Lo Sylla; Laura Quevedo Cañizares	Portugal (POR); Ana Rua; Emília Ferreira; Josephine Filipe; Sofia Pinheiro

== Men ==
Participating Nations

Federation	Nation
FIBA Africa	Tunisia
FIBA Europe	Andorra; Croatia; Cyprus; France; Greece; Italy; Macedonia; Portugal; Serbia; Slovenia; Spain; Turkey

=== Preliminary Round ===
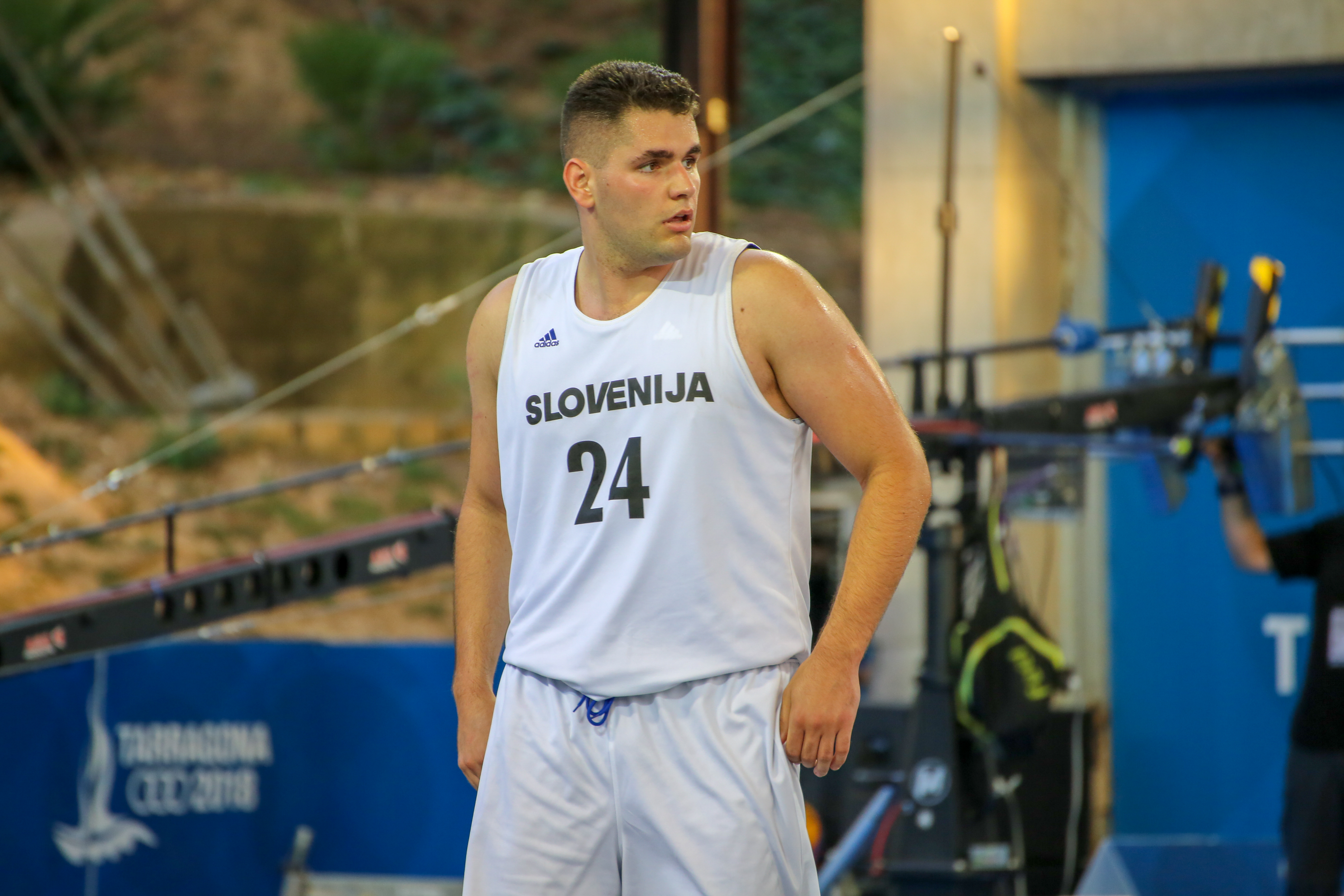
Dejan Trnjak (Slovenia) in Tarragona

All times are Central European Summer Time (UTC+2).

==== Group A ====
Pos	Team	Pld	W	L	PF	PA	PD	Qualification
1	Slovenia	2	2	0	40	33	+7	Quarterfinals
2	Greece	2	1	1	36	39	−3	Quarterfinals
3	Spain	2	0	2	35	39	−4	

Source: Tarragona 2018
Rules for classification: 1) Wins; 2) Head-to-head record; 3) Points scored.

27 June
10:40

Report

Greece	16–21	Slovenia

Camp de Mart Auditorium, Tarragona

28 June
17:00

Report

Slovenia	19–17 (OT)	Spain

Camp de Mart Auditorium, Tarragona

28 June
18:00

Report

Spain	18–20	Greece

Camp de Mart Auditorium, Tarragona

==== Group B ====
Pos	Team	Pld	W	L	PF	PA	PD	Qualification
1	Italy	2	1	1	39	24	+15	Quarterfinals
2	Croatia	2	1	1	36	38	−2	Quarterfinals
3	Tunisia	2	1	1	25	38	−13	

Source: Tarragona 2018
Rules for classification: 1) Wins; 2) Head-to-head record; 3) Points scored.

28 June
20:00

Report

Italy	21–5	Tunisia

Camp de Mart Auditorium, Tarragona

28 June
21:20

Report

Tunisia	20–17	Croatia

Camp de Mart Auditorium, Tarragona

29 June
10:20

Report

Italy	18–19	Croatia

Camp de Mart Auditorium, Tarragona

==== Group C ====
Pos	Team	Pld	W	L	PF	PA	PD	Qualification
1	Serbia	2	2	0	43	20	+23	Quarterfinals
2	North Macedonia	2	1	1	30	38	−8	Quarterfinals
3	Andorra	2	0	2	27	42	−15	

Source: Tarragona 2018
Rules for classification: 1) Wins; 2) Head-to-head record; 3) Points scored.

27 June
11:00

Report

Andorra	10–22	Serbia

Camp de Mart Auditorium, Tarragona

28 June
17:20

Report

Serbia	21–10	North Macedonia

Camp de Mart Auditorium, Tarragona

28 June
18:20

Report

Andorra	17–20	North Macedonia

Camp de Mart Auditorium, Tarragona

==== Group D ====
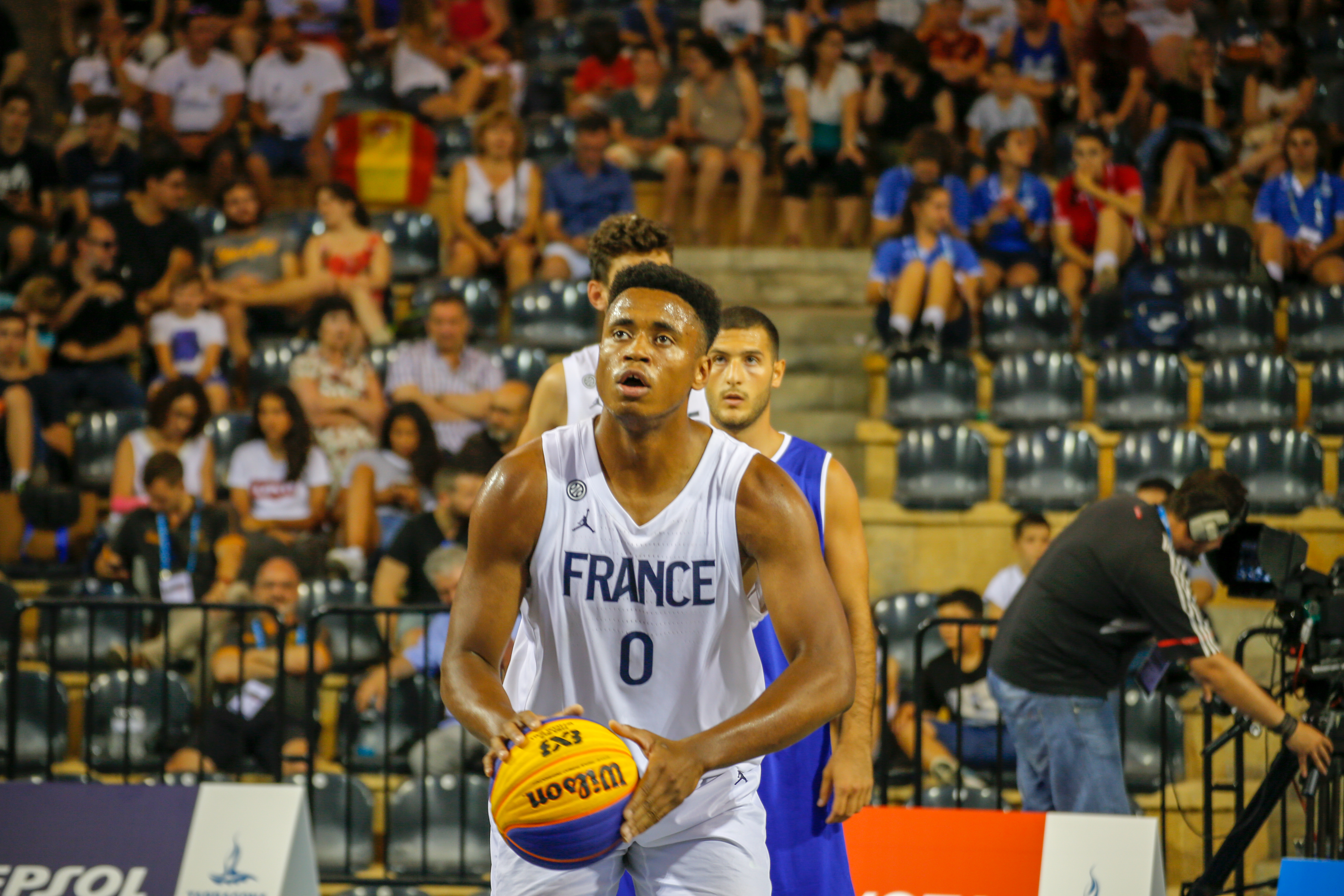
Jim Seymour (France)

Pos	Team	Pld	W	L	PF	PA	PD	Qualification
1	France	3	3	0	60	29	+31	Quarterfinals
2	Cyprus	3	2	1	48	45	+3	Quarterfinals
3	Portugal	3	1	2	45	56	−11	
4	Turkey	3	0	3	40	63	−23	

Source: Tarragona 2018
Rules for classification: 1) Wins; 2) Head-to-head record; 3) Points scored.

28 June
10:20

Report

Portugal	11–16	Cyprus

Camp de Mart Auditorium, Tarragona

28 June
11:00

Report

France	22–4	Turkey

Camp de Mart Auditorium, Tarragona

28 June
12:00

Report

Turkey	19–21 (OT)	Portugal

Camp de Mart Auditorium, Tarragona

28 June
20:20

Report

Cyprus	12–17	France

Camp de Mart Auditorium, Tarragona

29 June
11:20

Report

Turkey	17–20	Cyprus

Camp de Mart Auditorium, Tarragona

29 June
12:20

Report

France	21–13	Portugal

Camp de Mart Auditorium, Tarragona

=== Elimination stage ===
==== Bracket ====
Quarter-finals
29 June
Slovenia	19
North Macedonia	10
29 June
France	20
Croatia	18
29 June
Italy	21
Cyprus	9
29 June
Serbia	13
Greece	19

Semi-finals
29 June
Slovenia	3
France	21
29 June
Italy	21
Greece	17

Final
29 June
France (OT)	16
Italy	14
Third place
29 June
Slovenia	18
Greece	11

==== Quarterfinals ====
29 June
17:00

Report

Slovenia	19–10	North Macedonia

Camp de Mart Auditorium, Tarragona

29 June
17:20

Report

France	20–18	Croatia

Camp de Mart Auditorium, Tarragona

29 June
17:40

Report

Italy	21–9	Cyprus

Camp de Mart Auditorium, Tarragona

29 June
18:00

Report

Serbia	13–19	Greece

Camp de Mart Auditorium, Tarragona

==== Semifinals ====
29 June
19:00

Report

Slovenia	3–21	France

Camp de Mart Auditorium, Tarragona

29 June
19:20

Report

Italy	21–17	Greece

Camp de Mart Auditorium, Tarragona

==== Bronze medal match ====
29 June
20:00

Report

Slovenia	18–11	Greece

Camp de Mart Auditorium, Tarragona

==== Gold medal match ====
29 June
21:00

Report

France	16–14 (OT)	Italy

Camp de Mart Auditorium, Tarragona

== Women ==
Participating Nations

Federation	Nation
FIBA Europe	Andorra; France; Greece; Italy; Portugal; Serbia; Slovenia; Spain; Turkey

=== Preliminary Round ===
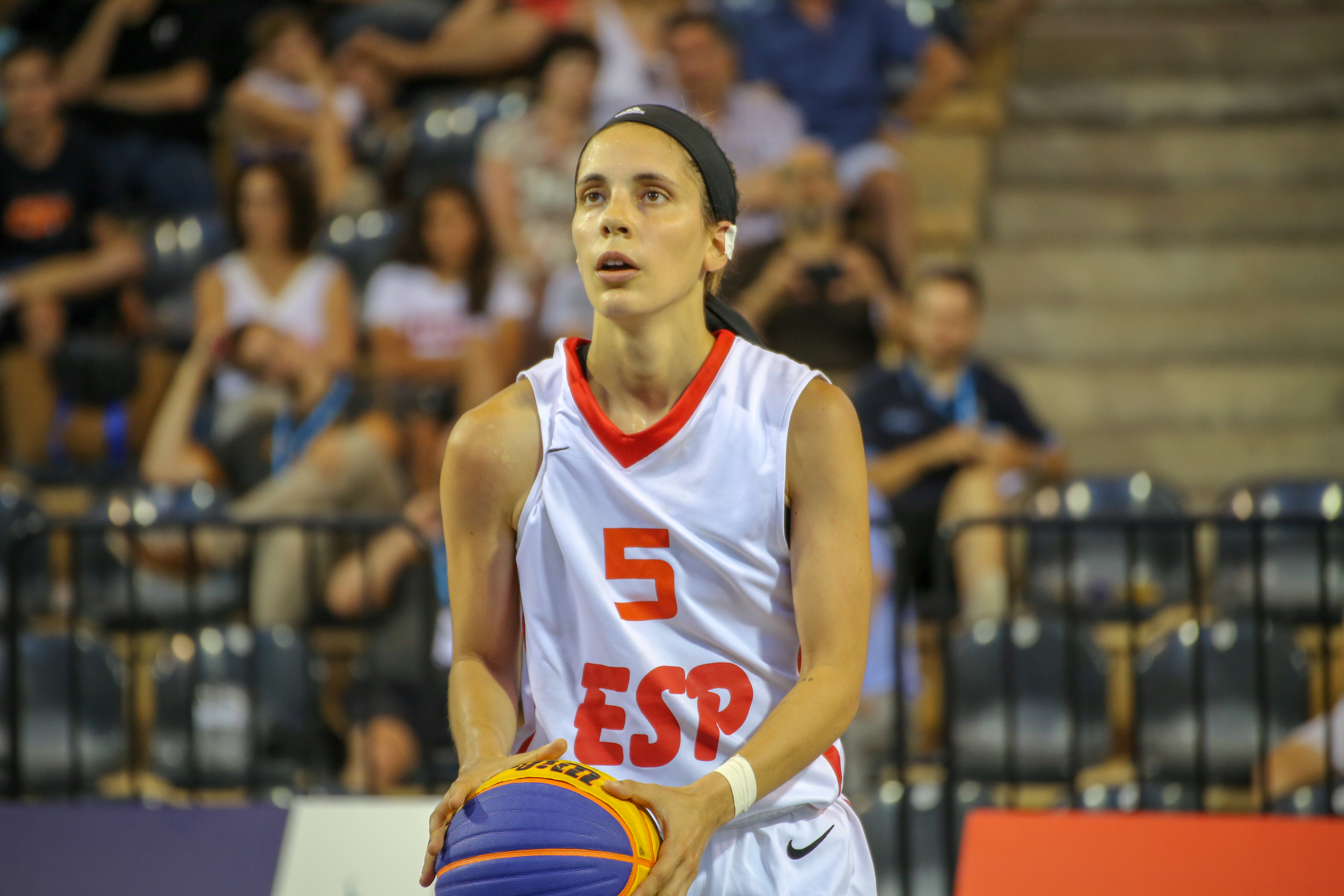
Marina Lizarazu (Spain)

All times are Central European Summer Time (UTC+2).

==== Group A ====
Pos	Team	Pld	W	L	PF	PA	PD	Qualification
1	Spain	4	4	0	70	37	+33	Semifinals
2	Portugal	4	2	2	40	38	+2	Semifinals
3	Greece	4	2	2	55	55	0	
4	Andorra	4	1	3	43	71	−28	
5	Slovenia	4	1	3	52	59	−7	

Source: Tarragona 2018
Rules for classification: 1) Wins; 2) Head-to-head record; 3) Points scored.

27 June
11:20

Report

Andorra	5–22	Spain

Camp de Mart Auditorium, Tarragona

28 June
10:40

Report

Spain	21–14	Greece

Camp de Mart Auditorium, Tarragona

28 June
11:20

Report

Slovenia	13–6	Portugal

Camp de Mart Auditorium, Tarragona

28 June
11:40

Report

Greece	16–12	Andorra

Camp de Mart Auditorium, Tarragona

28 June
12:20

Report

Portugal	7–8	Spain

Camp de Mart Auditorium, Tarragona

28 June
17:40

Report

Greece	13–9	Slovenia

Camp de Mart Auditorium, Tarragona

28 June
18:40

Report

Andorra	5–14	Portugal

Camp de Mart Auditorium, Tarragona

28 June
19:00

Report

Spain	19–11	Slovenia

Camp de Mart Auditorium, Tarragona

29 June
11:40

Report

Slovenia	19–21 (OT)	Andorra

Camp de Mart Auditorium, Tarragona

29 June
12:00

Report

Portugal	13–12	Greece

Camp de Mart Auditorium, Tarragona

==== Group B ====
Pos	Team	Pld	W	L	PF	PA	PD	Qualification
1	France	3	3	0	61	24	+37	Semifinals
2	Serbia	3	1	2	47	55	−8	Semifinals
3	Turkey	3	1	2	43	57	−14	
4	Italy	3	1	2	38	53	−15	

Source: Tarragona 2018
Rules for classification: 1) Wins; 2) Head-to-head record; 3) Points scored.

28 June
19:20

Report

France	20–2	Italy

Camp de Mart Auditorium, Tarragona

28 June
19:40

Report

Serbia	22–13	Turkey

Camp de Mart Auditorium, Tarragona

28 June
20:40

Report

France	21–11	Serbia

Camp de Mart Auditorium, Tarragona

28 June
21:00

Report

Italy	15–19	Turkey

Camp de Mart Auditorium, Tarragona

29 June
10:40

Report

Turkey	11–20	France

Camp de Mart Auditorium, Tarragona

29 June
11:00

Report

Italy	21–14	Serbia

Camp de Mart Auditorium, Tarragona

=== Elimination stage ===
==== Bracket ====
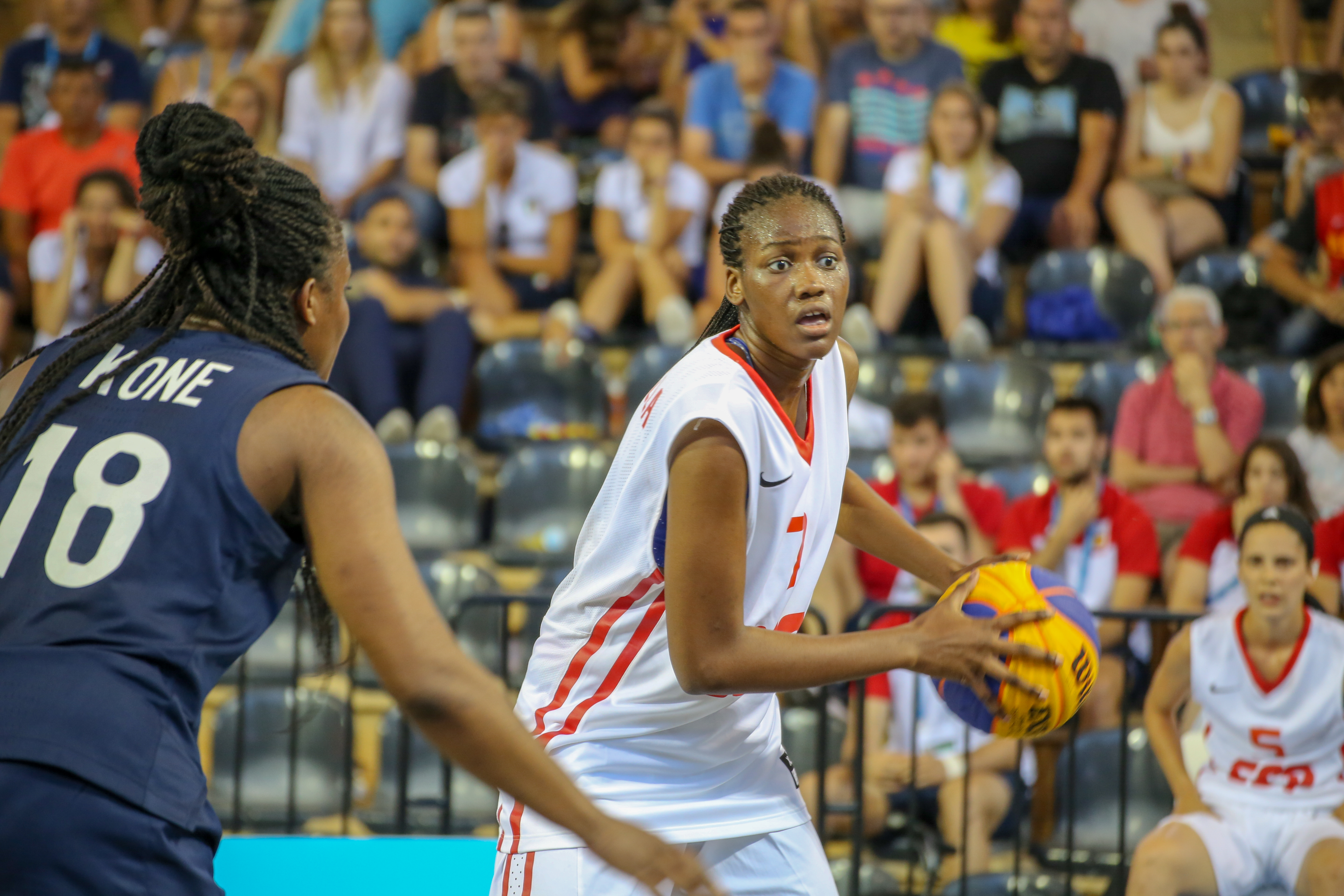
Nogaye Lo Silla and Assitan Koné

Semi-finals
29 June
Spain	22
Serbia	4
29 June
France (OT)	14
Portugal	13

Final
29 June
Spain	8
France	10
Third place
29 June
Serbia	20
Portugal	21

==== Semifinals ====
29 June
18:20

Report

Spain	22–4	Serbia

Camp de Mart Auditorium, Tarragona

29 June
18:40

Report

France	14–13 (OT)	Portugal

Camp de Mart Auditorium, Tarragona

==== Bronze medal match ====
29 June
19:40

Report

Serbia	20–21	Portugal

Camp de Mart Auditorium, Tarragona

==== Gold medal match ====
29 June
20:30

Report

Spain	8–10	France

Camp de Mart Auditorium, Tarragona
