= Egyptian Basketball Federation =

Basketball governing body in Egypt

Federation logo.

The Egyptian Basketball Federation is the governing body of the sport of basketball in Egypt. It joined International Basketball Federation FIBA in 1934.

== History ==
It was founded in 1934, and was a member of FIBA Europe, as the FIBA Africa zone was not founded until 1961.

== Offices ==
The Egyptian Basketball Federation offices are located in Cairo.

== Men's teams ==
The Egyptian Basketball Federation originally focused on the men's Egyptian national basketball team, with their achievements including 9th place at the 1952 Summer Olympics, as well as its 5th place at the 1950 FIBA World Championship. At the FIBA Africa Championships, Egypt holds a records number of 16 medals. Egypt's men's team participated in the Summer Olympic Games seven times. In 1984 and 1988, Egypt came in the 12th on both occasions.

== Women's team ==
The Egyptian women's national basketball team won the FIBA Africa Championship for Women in 1966 and 1968, and came second in 1970, as the United Arab Republic.

== See also ==
- Egyptian Basketball Premier League
- Maccabi Cairo
