= 2014 FIBA 3x3 World Championships – Women's tournament =

2014 FIBA 3x3 World Championships

Tournament details
- Host country: Russia
- City: Moscow
- Dates: 5–8 June 2014
- Teams: 24
- Venue: 1 (in 1 host city)

Final positions
- Champions: United States (2nd title)
- Runners-up: Russia
- Third place: Belgium
- Fourth place: Czech Republic

The women's tournament of the 2014 FIBA 3x3 World Championships hosted in Russia was contested by 24 teams.

== Participating teams ==
Four FIBA zones were represented at the tournament with no team from FIBA Oceania qualifying for the event. The top 24 teams, including the hosts, based on the FIBA National Federation ranking qualified for the tournament.

FIBA Asia (4)

- China (10)
- Indonesia (18)
- Syria (24)
- Thailand (19)

FIBA Africa (2)

- Tunisia (22)
- Uganda (15)

FIBA Oceania (0)

- None qualified

FIBA Americas (4)

- Argentina (21)
- Brazil (5)
- Uruguay (9)
- United States (12)

FIBA Europe (14)

- Andorra (2)
- Belgium (16)
- Czech Republic (3)
- Estonia (14)
- France (7)
- Germany (6)
- Hungary (13)
- Italy (17)
- Netherlands (11)
- Romania (1)
- Russia (23) (hosts)
- Spain (4)
- Switzerland (8)
- Ukraine (20)

== Main tournament ==
=== Preliminary round ===
==== Group A ====
Team	Pld	W	L	PF	PA	PD	Pts
Belgium	5	5	0	91	60	+31	10
Switzerland	5	4	1	79	56	+23	9
Romania	5	3	2	81	67	+14	8
Uruguay	5	1	4	53	80	−27	6
Italy	5	1	4	49	75	−26	6
Syria	5	1	4	47	62	−15	6

Pts Ave
18.2
15.8
16.2
10.6
9.8
9.4

(Belgium)	(Switzerland)	(Romania)	(Uruguay)	(Italy)	(Syria)
—	17-11	20-17	21-11	17-9	16-12
11-17	—	20-9	17-12	19-11	12-7
17-20	9-20	—	21-9	17-10	17-8
11-21	12-17	9-21	—	11-12	10-9
9-17	11-19	10-17	12-11	—	7-11
12-16	7-12	8-17	9-10	11-7	—

==== Group B ====
Team	Pld	W	L	PF	PA	PD	Pts
Russia	5	5	0	103	44	+59	10
France	5	4	1	85	49	+36	9
China	5	3	2	68	67	+1	8
Uganda	5	2	3	58	78	−20	7
Indonesia	5	1	4	57	88	−31	6
Andorra	5	0	5	29	74	−45	5

Pts Ave
20.6
17.0
13.6
11.6
11.4
5.8

(Russia)	(France)	(China)	(Uganda)	(Indonesia)	(Andorra)
—	21-10	19-14	21-7	21-11	21-2
10-21	—	18-14	19-6	19-1	19-7
14-19	14-18	—	13-9	18-16	9-5
7-21	6-19	9-13	—	21-19	15-6
11-21	1-19	16-18	19-21	—	10-9
2-21	7-19	5-9	6-15	9-10	—

==== Group C ====
Team	Pld	W	L	PF	PA	PD	Pts
Czech Republic	5	5	0	71	40	+31	10
Germany	5	3	2	68	57	+11	8
Netherlands	5	3	2	64	56	+8	8
Estonia	5	3	2	54	56	−2	8
Tunisia	5	1	4	55	62	−7	6
Thailand	5	0	5	45	86	−41	5

Pts Ave
14.2
13.6
12.8
10.8
11.0
9.0

(Czech Republic)	(Germany)	(Netherlands)	(Estonia)	(Tunisia)	(Thailand)
—	17-11	11-7	13-9	9-8	21-5
11-17	—	15-8	9-10	16-10	17-12
7-11	8-15	—	13-12	15-12	21-6
9-13	10-9	12-13	—	11-10	12-11
8-9	10-16	12-15	10-11	—	15-11
5-21	12-17	6-21	11-12	11-15	—

==== Group D ====
Team	Pld	W	L	PF	PA	PD	Pts
United States	5	5	0	100	40	+60	10
Spain	5	4	1	60	51	+9	9
Argentina	5	3	2	79	68	+11	8
Brazil	5	2	3	58	78	−20	7
Ukraine	5	1	4	52	79	−27	6
Hungary	5	0	5	48	81	−33	5

Pts Ave
20.0
12.0
15.8
11.6
10.4
9.6

(United States)	(Spain)	(Argentina)	(Brazil)	(Ukraine)	(Hungary)
—	15-6	21-11	21-8	21-10	21-5
6-11	—	11-10	16-9	10-9	17-7
11-21	10-11	—	21-13	18-6	19-17
8-21	9-16	13-21	—	18-13	10-7
10-21	9-10	6-18	13-18	—	14-12
5-21	7-17	17-19	7-10	12-14	—

=== Knockout stage ===
Round of 16
Belgium	17
Brazil	8
Germany	10
China	9
United States	19
Uruguay	6
France	17
Netherlands	11
Czech Republic	21
Uganda	10
Switzerland	17
Argentina	14
Russia	14
Estonia	11
Spain	12
Romania	16

Quarter-Finals
Belgium	20
Germany	16
United States	12
France	9
Czech Republic	16
Switzerland	11
Russia	21
Romania	8

Semi-Finals
Belgium	14
United States	18
Czech Republic	5
Russia	13

Final
United States	15
Russia	8
Third place
Belgium	14
Czech Republic	12

== Final standings ==
Rank	Team	Record
1st place, gold medalist(s)	United States	9–0
2nd place, silver medalist(s)	Russia	8–1
3rd place, bronze medalist(s)	Belgium	8–1
4	Czech Republic	7–2
5	France	5–2
6	Switzerland	5–2
7	Romania	4–3
8	Germany	4–3
9	Spain	4–2
10	Argentina	3–3
11	China	3–3
12	Netherlands	3–3
13	Estonia	3–3
14	Uganda	2–4
15	Brazil	2–4
16	Uruguay	1–5
17	Indonesia	1–4
18	Tunisia	1–4
19	Ukraine	1–4
20	Italy	1–4
21	Syria	1–4
22	Hungary	0–5
23	Thailand	0–5
24	Andorra	0–5

== Awards ==
2014 FIBA 3x3 World Champions – Women's

United States
2nd title
