= Egypt women's national 3x3 team =

National 3x3 basketball team

Egypt
- FIBA ranking: 19
- FIBA zone: FIBA Africa
- National federation: EBF

World Cup
- Appearances: 2

Africa Cup
- Appearances: 5
- Medals: (gold) (2019, 2022); (silver) (2023, 2024)

The Egypt women's national 3x3 basketball team is the basketball side that represents Egypt in international 3x3 basketball (3 against 3) competitions. It is organized and run by the Egyptian Basketball Federation.

== Competitions ==
=== World Cup ===
Year	Position	Pld	W	L
(Greece) 2012 Athens	Did not present			
(Russia) 2014 Moscow	Did not present			
(China) 2016 Guangzhou	Did not present			
(France) 2017 Nantes	Did not present			
(Philippines) 2018 Bocaue	Did not present			
(Netherlands) 2019 Amsterdam	Did not present			
(Belgium) 2022 Antwerp	16th	3	0	3
(Austria) 2023 Vienna	13th	4	1	3
(Mongolia) 2025 Ulaanbaatar	Did not present			
(Poland) 2026 Warsaw	To be determined			
2027 Singapore	To be determined			
Total	2/11	7	1	6

=== Africa Cup ===
Year	Position	Pld	W	L
(Togo) 2017 Lomé	5th	4	2	2
(Togo) 2018 Lomé	9th	2	0	2
(Uganda) 2019 Kampala	1st (gold)	5	4	1
(Egypt) 2022 Cairo	1st (gold)	5	5	0
(Egypt) 2023 Cairo	2nd (silver)	5	4	1
(Madagascar) 2024 Antananarivo	2nd (silver)	4	2	2
Total	6/6	25	17	8

=== African Games ===
Year	Position	Pld	W	L
(Morocco) 2018 Rabat	Did not present			
(Ghana) 2023 Accra	5th	4	2	2
Total	1/2	4	2	2

=== Mediterranean Games ===
Year	Position	Pld	W	L
(Spain) 2018 Tarragona	Did not present			
(Algeria) 2022 Oran	11th	3	0	3
Total	1/2	3	0	3

== See also ==
- Egyptian Basketball Federation
- Egypt men's national 3x3 team
- Egypt men's national under-18 3x3 team
- Egypt women's national under-18 3x3 team
