= Egypt men's national 3x3 team =

National 3x3 basketball team

Egypt
- FIBA ranking: 25
- FIBA zone: FIBA Africa
- National federation: EBF

World Cup
- Appearances: 4

Africa Cup
- Appearances: 5
- Medals: (gold) (2019, 2023); (silver) (2022)

The Egypt men's national 3x3 team is a national basketball team of Egypt, governed by the Egyptian Basketball Federation. It represents the country in international 3x3 (3 against 3) basketball competitions.

== Competitions ==
=== World Cup ===
| Year | Position | Pld | W | L |
|---|---|---|---|---|
| (Greece) 2012 Athens | 14th | 6 | 3 | 3 |
| (Russia) 2014 Moscow | Did not present | | | |
| (China) 2016 Guangzhou | 16th | 4 | 1 | 3 |
| (France) 2017 Nantes | 18th | 4 | 0 | 4 |
| (Philippines) 2018 Bocaue | Did not present | | | |
| (Netherlands) 2019 Amsterdam | Did not present | | | |
| (Belgium) 2022 Antwerp | 18th | 4 | 1 | 3 |
| (Austria) 2023 Vienna | Did not present | | | |
| (Mongolia) 2025 Ulaanbaatar | Did not present | | | |
| (Poland) 2026 Warsaw | Did not present | | | |
| 2027 Singapore | To be determined | | | |
| Total | 4/11 | 18 | 5 | 13 |

=== Africa Cup ===
| Year | Position | Pld | W | L |
|---|---|---|---|---|
| (Togo) 2017 Lomé | 4th | 5 | 3 | 2 |
| (Togo) 2018 Lomé | 6th | 3 | 1 | 2 |
| (Uganda) 2019 Kampala | 1st (gold) | 5 | 5 | 0 |
| (Egypt) 2022 Cairo | 2nd (silver) | 6 | 4 | 2 |
| (Egypt) 2023 Cairo | 1st (gold) | 5 | 5 | 0 |
| (Madagascar) 2024 Antananarivo | 10th | 4 | 0 | 4 |
| (Madagascar) 2025 Antananarivo | 2nd (silver) | 5 | 4 | 1 |
| Total | 7/7 | 33 | 22 | 11 |

=== African Games ===
| Year | Position | Pld | W | L |
|---|---|---|---|---|
| (Morocco) 2019 Rabat | 2nd (silver) | 7 | 6 | 1 |
| (Ghana) 2023 Accra | 17th | 3 | 1 | 2 |
| Total | 2/2 | 10 | 7 | 3 |

=== Mediterranean Games ===
| Year | Position | Pld | W | L |
|---|---|---|---|---|
| (Spain) 2018 Tarragona | Did not present | | | |
| (Algeria) 2022 Oran | 9th | 5 | 3 | 2 |
| Total | 1/2 | 5 | 3 | 2 |

== See also ==
- Egyptian Basketball Federation
- Egypt women's national 3x3 team
- Egypt men's national under-18 3x3 team
- Egypt women's national under-18 3x3 team
