= Turkey women's national 3x3 team =

National 3x3 basketball team

Turkey
- FIBA zone: FIBA Europe

FIBA 3x3 World Championships
- Appearances: 1 (2012)
- Medals: None

FIBA Europe 3x3 Championships
- Appearances: 1 (2014)
- Medals: None

The Turkey women's national 3x3 team is a national basketball team of Turkey, governed by the Turkish Basketball Federation.

It represents the country in international 3x3 (3 against 3) women's basketball competitions.

== Squad ==
- Betül Erkoyuncu
- Büşra Akbaş
- Derin Yaya
- Ezgi Manlacı

== Participations ==
=== Mediterranean Games ===
| Year | Host nation | Rank | Pld | W | L |
|---|---|---|---|---|---|
| 2018 | Spain | 6th | 3 | 1 | 2 |

== See also ==
  - Men's
- Turkey Men's national basketball team
- Turkey Men's national basketball team U20
- Turkey Men's national basketball team U18 and U19
- Turkey Men's national basketball team U16 and U17
- Turkey Men's national 3x3 team
- Women's
- Turkey Women's national basketball team
- Turkey Women's national basketball team U20
- Turkey Women's national basketball team U18 and U19
- Turkey Women's national basketball team U16 and U17
- Turkey Women's national 3x3 team
