= Uganda women's national 3x3 team =

National basketball team of Uganda

Uganda
- FIBA zone: FIBA Africa

FIBA 3x3 World Championships
- Appearances: 1 (2014)
- Medals: None

FIBA Africa 3x3 Championships
- Appearances: None

The Uganda women's national 3x3 team is a national basketball team of Uganda, administered by the Federation of Uganda Basketball Associations ("FUBA").

It represents the country in international 3x3 (3 against 3) women's basketball competitions.

== See also ==
- Uganda women's national basketball team
