= Madagascar men's national 3x3 team =

National 3x3 basketball team

Madagascar
- FIBA zone: FIBA Africa

World Cup
- Appearances: 3

Africa Cup
- Appearances: 1
- Medals: Gold: 2022

African Games
- Appearances: 1
- Medals: Gold: 2019

The Madagascar men's national 3x3 team is a national basketball team of Madagascar, administered by the Fédération Malagasy de Basket-Ball. It represents the country in international 3x3 (3 against 3) basketball competitions.

As of 2019, the head coach has been Jean de Dieu Randrianarivelo.

== Tournament record ==
=== World Cup ===
Year	Position	Pld	W	L
(Greece) 2012 Athens	Did not qualify			
(Russia) 2014 Moscow	Did not qualify			
(China) 2016 Guangzhou	Did not qualify			
(France) 2017 Nantes	Did not qualify			
(Philippines) 2018 Bocaue	Did not qualify			
(Netherlands) 2019 Amsterdam	Did not qualify			
(Belgium) 2022 Antwerp	Did not qualify			
(Austria) 2023 Vienna	16th	4	1	3
(Mongolia) 2025 Ulaanbaatar	20th	4	0	4
(Poland) 2026 Warsaw	11th	5	2	3
2027 Singapore	To be determined			
Total	3/11	13	3	10

=== Champions Cup ===
Year	Position	Pld	W	L
(Thailand) 2025 Bangkok	7th	3	0	3
(Thailand) 2026 Bangkok	8th	3	0	3
Total	2/2	6	0	6

== See also ==
- Madagascar national basketball team
- Madagascar women's national 3x3 team
