= Kyle Filipowski =

American basketball player (born 2003)

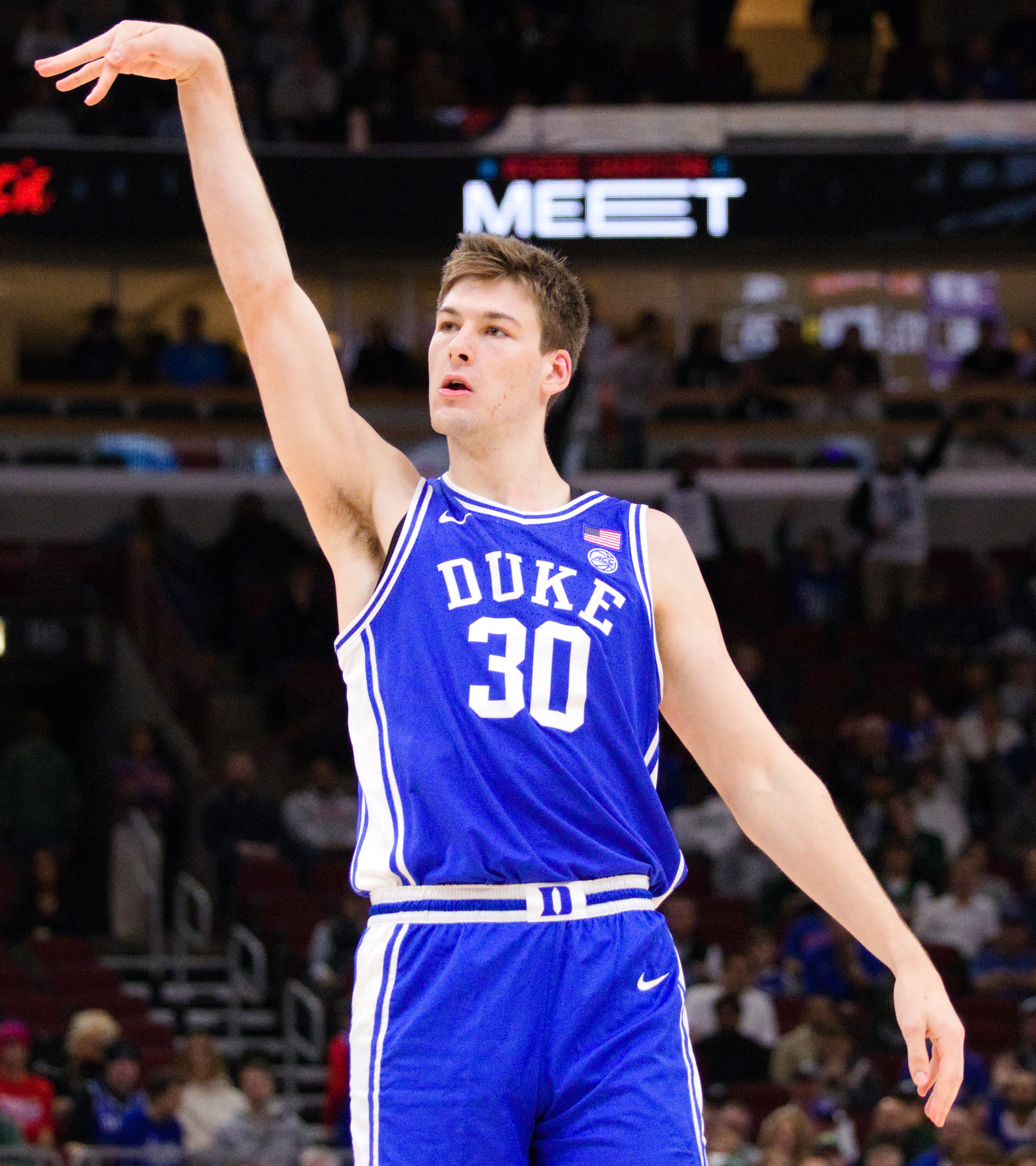
- Filipowski with Duke in 2023

No. 2 – Utah Jazz
- Position: Center
- League: NBA

Personal information
- Born: November 7, 2003 (age 23) Middletown, New York, U.S.
- Listed height: 6 ft 11 in (2.11 m)
- Listed weight: 250 lb (113 kg)

Career information
- High school: Minisink Valley (Slate Hill, New York); Fordham Prep (The Bronx, New York); Wilbraham & Monson Academy (Wilbraham, Massachusetts)
- College: Duke (2022–2024)
- NBA draft: 2024: 2nd round, 32nd overall pick
- Drafted by: Utah Jazz
- Playing career: 2024–present

Career history
- 2024–present: Utah Jazz
- 2024: →Salt Lake City Stars

Career highlights
- Consensus second-team All-American (2024); First-team All-ACC (2024); Second-team All-ACC (2023); ACC All-Freshman team (2023); ACC Rookie of the Year (2023); ACC tournament MVP (2023); Nike Hoop Summit (2022)
- Stats at NBA.com
- Stats at Basketball Reference
Medals
Men's 3x3 basketball
Representing the United States
FIBA 3x3 Under-18 World Cup
Gold medal – first place	2021 Hungary	Team

Kyle Jarred "Flip" Filipowski (born November 7, 2003) is an American professional basketball player for the Utah Jazz of the National Basketball Association (NBA). He played college basketball for the Duke Blue Devils, and was selected by the Jazz in the second round of the 2024 NBA draft.

== Early life ==
Born in Middletown, New York, Filipowski first attended Minisink Valley High School in Slate Hill, New York. He transferred after his freshman year to Fordham Preparatory School in The Bronx. After his sophomore year, Filipowski reclassified and transferred to Wilbraham & Monson Academy in Wilbraham, Massachusetts. He was the Gatorade Basketball Player of the Year for Massachusetts in 2021. Filipowski was ineligible to play in the 2022 McDonald's All-American Boys Game due to being a fifth-year player.

Filipowski was a consensus five-star recruit and one of the top players in the 2022 class, according to major recruiting services. On July 29, 2021, he committed to playing college basketball for Duke.

College recruiting
Name	Hometown	School	Height	Weight	Commit date
Kyle Filipowski; PF / C	Westtown, NY	Wilbraham & Monson Academy (MA)	6 ft 11 in (2.11 m)	230 lb (100 kg)	Jul 29, 2021
Kyle Filipowski; PF / C	Recruit ratings: Rivals: 247Sports: ESPN: (93)				
Overall recruit ranking: Rivals: 5 247Sports: 4 ESPN: 7
Note: In many cases, Scout, Rivals, 247Sports, On3, and ESPN may conflict in their listings of height and weight.; In these cases, the average was taken. ESPN grades are on a 100-point scale.; Sources: "Duke 2022 Basketball Commitments". Rivals.; "2022 Duke Blue Devils Recruiting Class". ESPN.; "2022 Team Ranking". Rivals.

== College career ==
=== Freshman season (2022–2023) ===
On January 11, 2023, Filipowski scored a double-double 28 points and 15 rebounds in a 77–69 win over Pittsburgh. On February 14, 2023, Filipowski scored 22 points and 6 rebounds in a 68–64 victory against Notre Dame. On March 4, 2023, Filipowski scored another double-double of 22 points and 13 rebounds in a 62–57 win over arch-rival North Carolina. On March 11, 2023, Filipowski scored 20 points and 10 rebounds in a 59–49 victory against Virginia in the championship game of the ACC Tournament, while also being named Tournament MVP. As a freshman, Filipowski averaged 15.1 points and nine rebounds per game, and led Division I freshmen with 16 double-doubles. After the end of his freshman season, he was named ACC Rookie of the Year. Despite being a projected first round selection in the 2023 NBA draft, Filipowski opted to return for his sophomore season. He underwent hip surgery in April 2023, to repair malformed hip joints atop both legs.

=== Sophomore season (2023–2024) ===
On December 18, Filipowski was named Atlantic Coast Conference (ACC) player of the week. On December 20, Filipowski scored a double-double of 13 points and 10 rebounds in a 78–70 win against Baylor. On January 9, 2024, Filipowski scored a double-double 26 points and 10 rebounds in a 75–53 win over Pittsburgh. On January 13, 2024, Filipowski scored a career high 30 points and 13 rebounds in a 84–79 win over Georgia Tech. On February 24, 2024, Filipowski suffered an apparent knee injury in a collision with a Wake Forest fan participating in a court storming after the Demon Deacons upset the eighth-ranked Blue Devils. After calls to ban court storming by Duke head coach Jon Scheyer, Filipowski was able to play in the next game on February 28. Ironically, nine days later on March 9, 2024, Filipowski appeared to trip Harrison Ingram in the final regular season game against UNC.

On April 13, 2024, Filipowski declared for the 2024 NBA draft, forgoing his remaining college eligibility. He later received a green room invite, but was not drafted in the first round. On the morning of the second round, draft analyst Jonathan Givony reported that the draft slide was due to teams being concerned about his relationship with his fiancée, claiming that he was "estranged from his family because of this whole situation", and that she was "much older than him". When asked about the rumors, a Utah Jazz front office member stated they had done a background check and were excited to select Filipowski all the same.

== Professional career ==
On June 27, 2024, Filipowski was selected with the 32nd overall pick by the Utah Jazz in the 2024 NBA draft and on August 12, he signed with the team. Throughout his rookie season, he had been assigned several times to the Salt Lake City Stars. On July 22, 2025, following his rookie season, Filipowski became the first member of the Utah Jazz to be named NBA Summer League MVP.

== National team career ==
Filipowski represented the United States at the 2021 FIBA 3x3 Under-18 World Cup in Debrecen, Hungary. He won a gold medal with his teammates: Gradey Dick, Keyonte George and Eric Dailey Jr.

== Career statistics ==
Legend
GP	Games played	GS	Games started	MPG	Minutes per game
FG%	Field goal percentage	3P%	3-point field goal percentage	FT%	Free throw percentage
RPG	Rebounds per game	APG	Assists per game	SPG	Steals per game
BPG	Blocks per game	PPG	Points per game	**Bold**	Career high

=== NBA ===
Year	Team	GP	GS	MPG	FG%	3P%	FT%	RPG	APG	SPG	BPG	PPG
2024–25	Utah	72	27	21.1	**.502**	**.350**	.650	6.1	1.9	.7	.3	9.6
2025–26	Utah	**77**	**41**	**23.4**	.492	.325	**.750**	**7.2**	**2.6**	**.9**	**.5**	**11.4**
Career		149	68	22.3	.496	.337	.710	6.7	2.3	.8	.4	10.5

=== College ===
Year	Team	GP	GS	MPG	FG%	3P%	FT%	RPG	APG	SPG	BPG	PPG
2022–23	Duke	**36**	**36**	29.1	.441	.282	**.765**	**9.0**	1.6	**1.3**	.7	15.1
2023–24	Duke	**36**	**36**	**30.4**	**.505**	**.348**	.671	8.3	**2.8**	1.1	**1.5**	**16.4**
Career		72	72	29.8	.473	.314	.718	8.6	2.2	1.2	1.1	15.8

== Personal life ==
Filipowski's brother, Matt, played with Kyle at Wilbraham & Monson and committed to playing college basketball for Harvard.

Filipowski is engaged to Caitlin Hutchison. This relationship is controversial, as there are allegations that Hutchinson began dating Filipowski when he was in high school and she was a 24 or 25 year old college graduate.

== See also ==
- List of All-Atlantic Coast Conference men's basketball teams
