= Eric Dailey Jr. =

American basketball player (born 2004)

No. 3 – UCLA Bruins
- Position: Small forward / shooting guard
- League: Big Ten Conference

Personal information
- Born: January 15, 2004 (age 22) Columbia, South Carolina, U.S.
- Listed height: 6 ft 8 in (2.03 m)
- Listed weight: 235 lb (107 kg)

Career information
- High school: IMG Academy (Bradenton, Florida)
- College: Oklahoma State (2023–2024); UCLA (2024–present)

Career highlights
- Nike Hoops Summit (2023)
Medals
Men's basketball
Representing United States
FIBA Under-18 AmeriCup
Gold medal – first place	2022 Mexico	Team
Men's 3x3 basketball
Representing United States
FIBA Under-18 World Cup
Gold medal – first place	2021 Hungary	Team
FIBA Under-18 World Cup Dunk Contest
Gold medal – first place	2021 Hungary	Individual

Eric Lavell Dailey Jr. (born January 15, 2004) is an American college basketball player for the UCLA Bruins of the Big Ten Conference. He began his college career playing one season for the Oklahoma State Cowboys.

== Early life and high school career ==
Eric Dailey Jr. was born in 2004 in Columbia, South Carolina and raised in Bradenton, Florida. He grew up in a basketball-oriented family, with his mother, Shell, being a former national champion with the University of Texas women's basketball program and his father, Eric Sr., being a former professional basketball player. Dailey attended IMG Academy in Bradenton, where he developed his skills as a versatile forward. He was selected to play in the 2023 Nike Hoops Summit.

=== Recruiting ===
On April 12, 2023, Dailey committed to play college basketball for Texas Tech over offers from Florida State, Kansas and Kentucky, among others.

Dailey pointed out his bond with OSU coach Mike Boynton as a crucial element when he made his commitment to Oklahoma State. Their connection was forged when they achieved gold as teammates for Team USA during the FIBA U18 Americas Championship in the summer of 2022.

College recruiting
Name	Hometown	School	Height	Weight	Commit date
Eric Dailey Jr. SF	Bradenton, FL	IMG Academy	6 ft 6 in (1.98 m)	225 lb (102 kg)	Apr 12, 2023
Eric Dailey Jr. SF	Recruit ratings: Rivals: 247Sports: On3: ESPN: (85)				
Overall recruit ranking: Rivals: 73 247Sports: 38 On3: 55 ESPN: 54
Note: In many cases, Scout, Rivals, 247Sports, On3, and ESPN may conflict in their listings of height and weight.; In these cases, the average was taken. ESPN grades are on a 100-point scale.; Sources: "2023 Oklahoma State Basketball Commitments". Rivals.; "2023 Oklahoma State Recruiting Class". ESPN.; "2023 Team Ranking". Rivals.

== College career ==
On April 12, 2023, Dailey announced that he had committed to Oklahoma State. He averaged 9.3 points and 4.8 rebounds while shooting 49.6% from the field in his freshman year. However, in a significant move, Dailey announced his commitment to transfer to UCLA in April. As a junior in 2025–26, he had 14 points, a team-leading 10 rebounds and four steals to help the sixth-seeded Bruins win 88–84 in the quarterfinals of the Big Ten tournament over third-seeded Michigan State. Dailey had one of his top performances of the season in UCLA's opener in the 2026 NCAA tournament, when he had 20 points, five rebounds, two assists, two blocks and two steals to help the No. 7–seed Bruins win 75–71 over No. 10–seed UCF.

== National team career ==
In 2019, Dailey first started training with Team USA at various camps. He helped the United States win a gold medal at the 2021 FIBA 3x3 Under-18 World Cup in Hungary. His teammates were Keyonte George, Gradey Dick and Kyle Filipowski. He also won a gold medal in the 2021 FIBA 3x3 Under-18 World Cup Dunk Contest. The following year, Dailey again competed with the national team at the 2022 FIBA 3x3 Under-18 World Cup. This year he was teammates with Coen Carr, Myles Colvin, and Brandon Gardner, with the team finishing in 11th place in Hungary. Dailey was also a member of the United States under-18 national team (standard 5x5 basketball) that won a gold medal at the 2022 FIBA Under-18 Americas Championship in Mexico. He again competed with the 5x5 national team at the 2023 FIBA Under-19 World Cup, where the team took fourth place in Hungary.

== Personal life ==
Dailey's father, Eric Sr., a 6-foot-6-inch (2.01 m) played college basketball for the TCU Horned Frogs and played professionally overseas for 10 years in Europe, Asia and South America. His mother, Shell, played college basketball for the Texas Longhorns and coached the WNBA's San Antonio Silver Stars from 2003 to 2004.
