= Nimari Burnett =

American basketball player (born 2001)

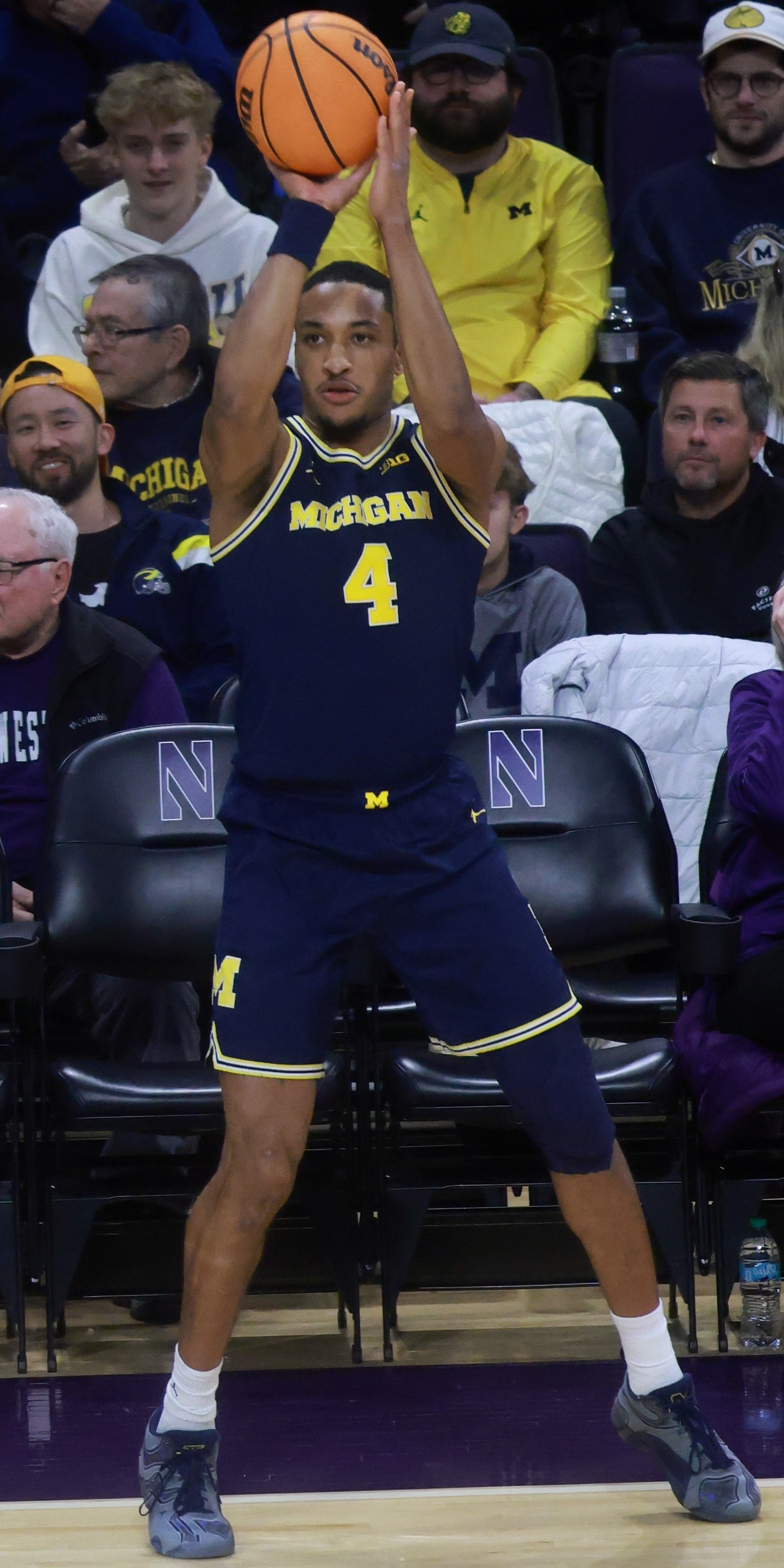
- Burnett with the 2025–26 Michigan Wolverines

No. 25 – Raptors 905
- Position: Shooting guard
- League: NBA G League

Personal information
- Born: December 20, 2001 (age 24) Chicago, Illinois, U.S.
- Listed height: 6 ft 5 in (1.96 m)
- Listed weight: 195 lb (88 kg)

Career information
- High school: Morgan Park (Chicago, Illinois); Prolific Prep (Napa, California)
- College: Texas Tech (2020–2021); Alabama (2022–2023); Michigan (2023–2026)
- NBA draft: 2026: undrafted
- Playing career: 2026–present

Career history
- 2026–present: Raptors 905

Career highlights
- NCAA champion (2026); McDonald's All-American (2020); Jordan Brand Classic (2020)
- Stats at NBA.com
- Stats at Basketball Reference
Medals
Men's 3x3 basketball
Representing the United States
FIBA Under-18 World Cup
Gold medal – first place	2019 Mongolia	Team
FIBA Under-18 World Cup Dunk Contest
Silver medal – second place	2019 Mongolia	Individual

Nimari Keith Burnett (born December 20, 2001) is an American professional basketball player for the Raptors 905 of the NBA G League. He previously played college basketball for the Texas Tech Red Raiders, Alabama Crimson Tide, and Michigan Wolverines. He was an NCAA national champion with Michigan in 2026.

== Early life ==
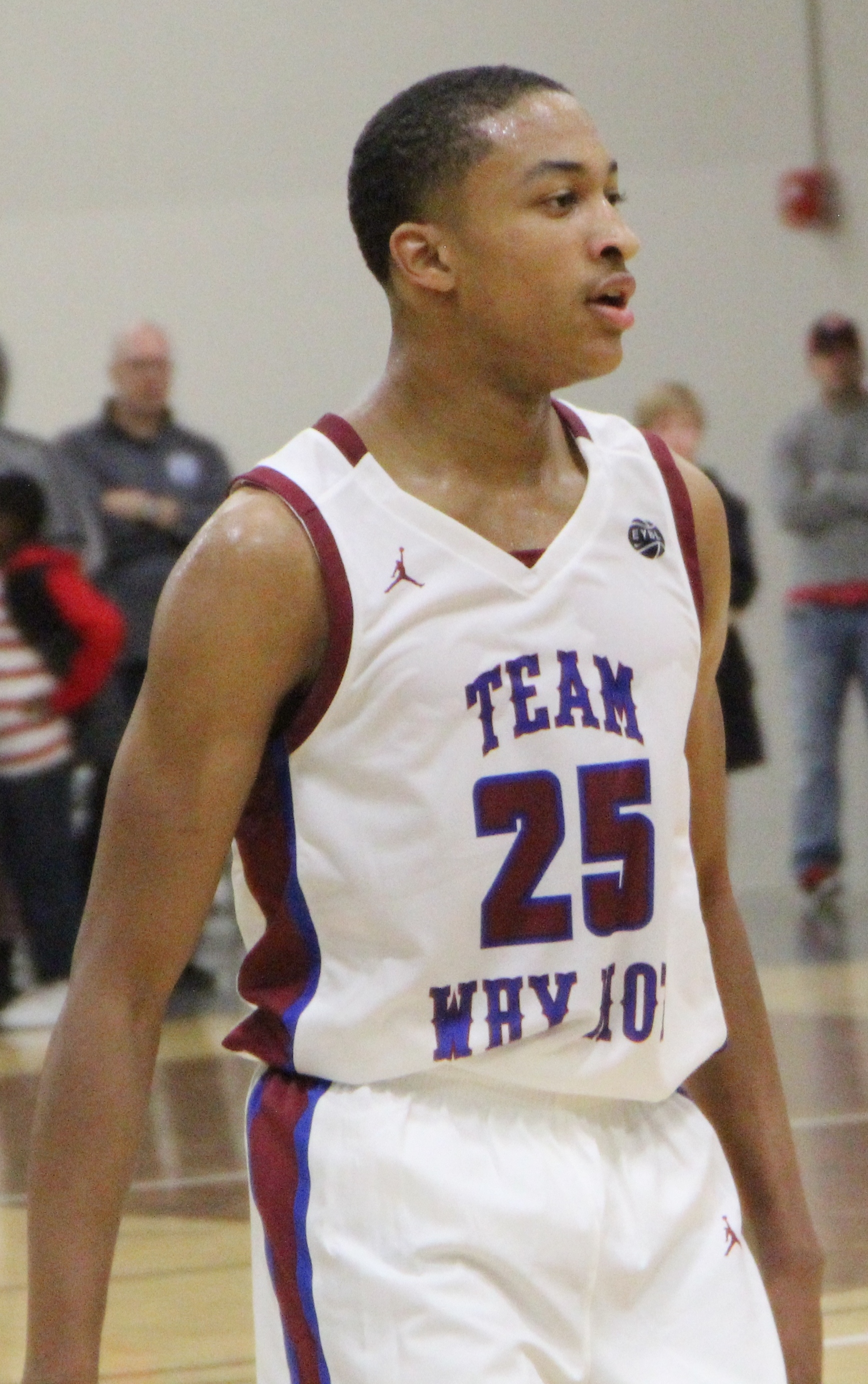
Burnett at the Nike EYBL in 2019

Burnett was born in Chicago on December 20, 2001, the son of Nikki and Brian Burnett. He played basketball for the eighth grade team at Beasley for three years and won a city championship. In his freshman season, he played for Morgan Park High School in Chicago and was teammates with junior Ayo Dosunmu. Burnett helped his team win the Class 3A state title, scoring 20 points in the championship. He earned MaxPreps Freshman All-American second team honors.

Entering his sophomore year, after initially enrolling at San Joaquin Memorial High School in Fresno, California, Burnett transferred to Prolific Prep, a national program based then in Napa, California and began attending Napa Christian Campus of Education. He missed five weeks of his sophomore season with a broken hand. On April 14, 2019, Burnett won a gold medal with Attack at the USA 3x3 Under-18 Championship with teammates Devin Askew, Dawson Garcia and Ethan Morton. As a senior, he averaged 25.5 points, 6.5 rebounds and 5.5 assists per game for Prolific Prep. Burnett was named Finals MVP of the Grind Session World Championship after scoring 37 points in a win over Our Saviour Lutheran School in the title game. He was selected to play in the McDonald's All-American Game and the Jordan Brand Classic, but both games were canceled due to the COVID-19 pandemic.

On November 12, 2019, Burnett committed to play college basketball for Texas Tech over offers from Alabama, Oregon and Michigan, among others. At number 19 by ESPN, he became the highest-ranked recruit in program history. Burnett explained, "I chose Texas Tech because of the winning culture of the program and the coaching staff. It felt like a big family."

College recruiting
Name	Hometown	School	Height	Weight	Commit date
Nimari Burnett; SG	Chicago, IL	Prolific Prep (CA)	6 ft 3 in (1.91 m)	185 lb (84 kg)	Nov 12, 2019
Nimari Burnett; SG	Recruit ratings: Rivals: 247Sports: ESPN: (93)				
Overall recruit ranking: Rivals: 39 247Sports: 38 ESPN: 22
Note: In many cases, Scout, Rivals, 247Sports, On3, and ESPN may conflict in their listings of height and weight.; In these cases, the average was taken. ESPN grades are on a 100-point scale.; Sources: "Texas Tech 2020 Basketball Commitments". Rivals.; "2020 Texas Tech Red Raiders Recruiting Class". ESPN.; "2020 Team Ranking". Rivals.

== College career ==
=== Texas Tech ===
==== 2020–21 ====
In 2020, Burnett enrolled at Texas Tech University. On December 6, he recorded a freshman season-high 12 points and six steals in an 81–40 win over Grambling State. On January 7, 2021, he left Texas Tech for personal reasons. As a freshman, Burnett came off the bench, averaging 5.3 points and 1.8 rebounds through 12 games.

=== Alabama ===
==== 2021–23 ====
On April 8, 2021, Burnett transferred to the University of Alabama. On September 8, he was ruled out for the season after undergoing right knee surgery. In his second season at Alabama, Burnett played in 27 games and started 9 times. He averaged 5.6 points, 2.0 rebounds and shot 32 percent on three-point attempts in just under 15 minutes per game.

=== Michigan ===
==== 2023–24 ====
On March 30, 2023, Burnett transferred to the University of Michigan. With the 2023–24 Wolverines team, he set career highs in every major statistical category with the exception of free throw percentage, steals and blocks per game. He averaged 9.6 points, 4.1 rebounds and 2.4 assists, while shooting 40 percent from the field and 35 percent from three-point territory. On November 13, Burnett scored a career-high 21 points against St. John’s, all in the first half.

==== 2024–25 ====
On April 30, 2024, Burnett announced he would be staying in Ann Arbor for his fifth collegiate season under new head coach Dusty May. Through 16 games for the 2024–25 Wolverines team, Burnett was deemed the top shooter in NCAA Division 1 basketball by Kenpom.com in “true shooting percentage,” which considers three-point shots, two-point shots and free throws. In that time, he averaged 10.9 points, shooting 57 percent from the field, 51 percent from three-point range and 81 percent from the free throw line.

On February 27, 2025 against Rutgers, Burnett scored a season-high 20 points and hit a deep three-point shot as time expired to win the game for the Wolverines. On March 16, one season after finishing in last place in the conference with Michigan, Burnett helped lead the Wolverines to a Big Ten championship in the 2025 Big Ten tournament.

==== 2025–26 ====
On April 21, 2025, Burnett announced he would return for his final season after being granted a sixth year of eligibility. On February 5, 2026, Burnett posted a career-high 31 points (including a career-high 7 three-point shots) in a 110–69 victory against Penn State, helping Michigan to a school record 21st win before a second loss. He was the first 30-point scorer for Michigan since Vladislav Goldin (his freshman roommate at Texas Tech) on January 19, 2025 and the first Wolverine to tally at least seven three point shots at Crisler Center since Aubrey Dawkins on March 7, 2015. In the 2026 NCAA tournament, the team won the national championship and tied the Big Ten Conference record for single-season wins, 37. Burnett finished his career at Michigan starting a program-record 109 consecutive games.

== Professional career ==
After going unselected in the 2026 NBA draft, Burnett agreed to an Exhibit 10 contract with the Toronto Raptors with a chance to compete to earn a two-way or standard contract following the NBA Summer League. During the preseason, Burnett averaged 6.6 points, 3.0 rebounds and 1.6 assists over 15.7 minutes per game, but he was waived on October 17. He was retained in the organization by the Raptors 905 of the NBA G League, following being waived by Toronto.

== National team career ==
Burnett represented the United States national 3x3 team, winning the national team’s first gold medal at the 2019 FIBA 3x3 U18 World Cup in Ulaanbaatar, Mongolia. He was teammates with Dawson Garcia, Devin Askew and Ethan Morton. Burnett scored 40 points, the fifth-most in the tournament. He also won a silver medal in the dunk contest.

== Career statistics ==
Legend
GP	Games played	GS	Games started	MPG	Minutes per game
FG%	Field goal percentage	3P%	3-point field goal percentage	FT%	Free throw percentage
RPG	Rebounds per game	APG	Assists per game	SPG	Steals per game
BPG	Blocks per game	PPG	Points per game	**Bold**	Career high

=== College ===
Year	Team	GP	GS	MPG	FG%	3P%	FT%	RPG	APG	SPG	BPG	PPG
2020–21	Texas Tech	12	0	17.7	.280	.174	.889	1.8	0.9	1.4	0.5	5.3
2021–22	Alabama	Did not play (medical redshirt)										
2022–23	Alabama	27	9	14.7	.368	.321	.780	2.0	0.7	0.4	0.1	5.6
2023–24	Michigan	32	32	31.3	.399	.347	.721	4.1	2.4	0.9	0.4	9.6
2024–25	Michigan	37	37	26.3	.476	.400	.763	3.5	1.5	0.8	0.2	9.4
2025–26	Michigan	40	40	19.8	.453	.375	.776	2.8	1.2	0.6	0.1	8.2
**Career**		**148**	**118**	**22.8**	**.423**	**.359**	**.776**	**3.0**	**1.4**	**0.7**	**0.2**	**8.1**

== Personal life ==
Burnett's mother, Nikki Burnett, opened a dollar store, as well as became a real estate broker by the age of 25. She also created basketball apparel clothing lines: BasketballMom and HoopLegend Apparel. In addition, she starred in and helped inspire the Lifetime reality show Bringing Up Ballers, which followed the lives of several Chicago-based entrepreneurial mothers whose children were star basketball players. In April 2025, Burnett proposed to Diana (Kannan) Burnett and they had their first child on August 14, 2026, a daughter named Blu Céline.
