= Nikolas Khamenia =

American basketball player (born 2006)

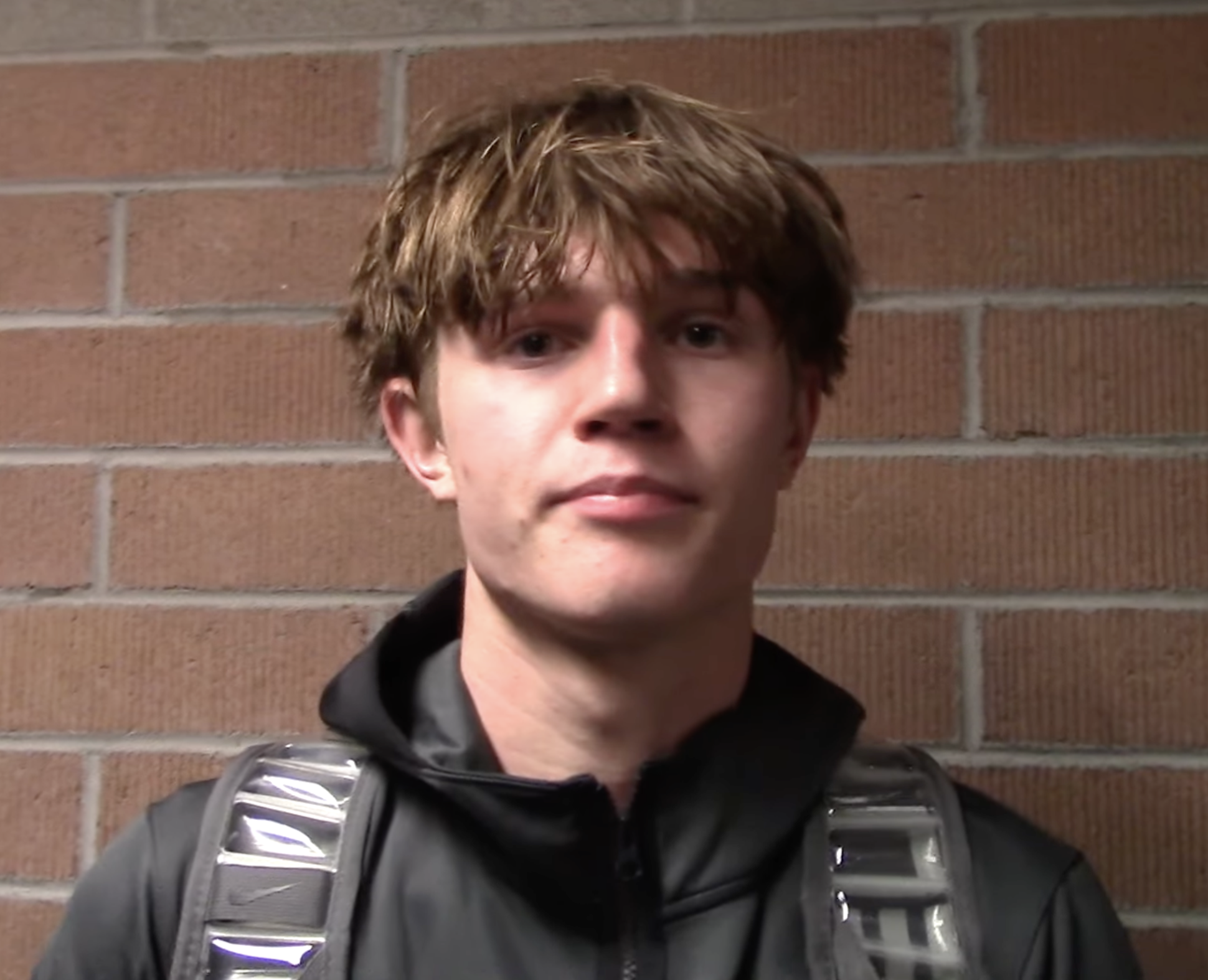
- Khamenia in 2025

No. 4 – UConn Huskies
- Position: Small forward / power forward
- Conference: Big East Conference

Personal information
- Born: December 27, 2006 (age 19)
- Listed height: 6 ft 8 in (2.03 m)
- Listed weight: 215 lb (98 kg)

Career information
- High school: Harvard-Westlake School (Los Angeles, California)
- College: Duke (2025–2026); UConn (2026–present)

Career highlights
- McDonald's All-American (2025); Nike Hoop Summit (2025); FIBA 3x3 Under-18 World Cup MVP (2024)
Medals
Men's basketball
Representing the United States
FIBA Under-19 World Cup
Gold medal – first place	2025 Switzerland	Team
FIBA Under-18 AmeriCup
Gold medal – first place	2024 Argentina	Team
Men's 3x3 basketball
Representing the United States
FIBA Under-18 World Cup
Gold medal – first place	2024 Hungary	Team

Nikolas Khamenia (born December 27, 2006) is an American college basketball player for the UConn Huskies of the Big East Conference. He previously played for the Duke Blue Devils.

== Early life and high school ==
Nikolas Khamenia grew up in North Hollywood, California and attended the Harvard-Westlake School in Studio City. He averaged 14.0 points, 7.2 rebounds, and 4.0 assists per game as a junior. Khamenia also plays for the Basketball Training Institute (BTI), an Amateur Athletic Union team, on the Puma Pro16 circuit.

Khamenia is rated a consensus top-35 recruit in the 2025 recruiting class. He committed to play college basketball at Duke over offers from UCLA and Gonzaga.

== College career ==
On April 8, 2026, Khamenia announced that he would be entering the transfer portal. On April 19, Khamenia transferred to play for the UConn Huskies.

== National team career ==
Khamenia represented the United States 3x3 team in the 2024 FIBA 3x3 Under-18 World Cup and was named the World Cup MVP as he won a gold medal. He was teammates with Bo Ogden, Amir Jenkins and Kingston Flemings.

Khamenia also represent the United States 5x5 team at the 2024 FIBA Under-18 AmeriCup in Argentina. He averaged 7.7 points, 6.3 rebounds, and 3.0 assists per game as the United States won the gold medal. He won his third gold medal with the 5x5 national team at the 2025 Under-19 World Cup in Switzerland.

== Personal life ==
Khamenia's parents are from Belarus. His father, Valery, played college basketball at George Washington University and is an assistant basketball coach at Los Angeles Valley College.
