= Keyonte George =

American basketball player (born 2003)

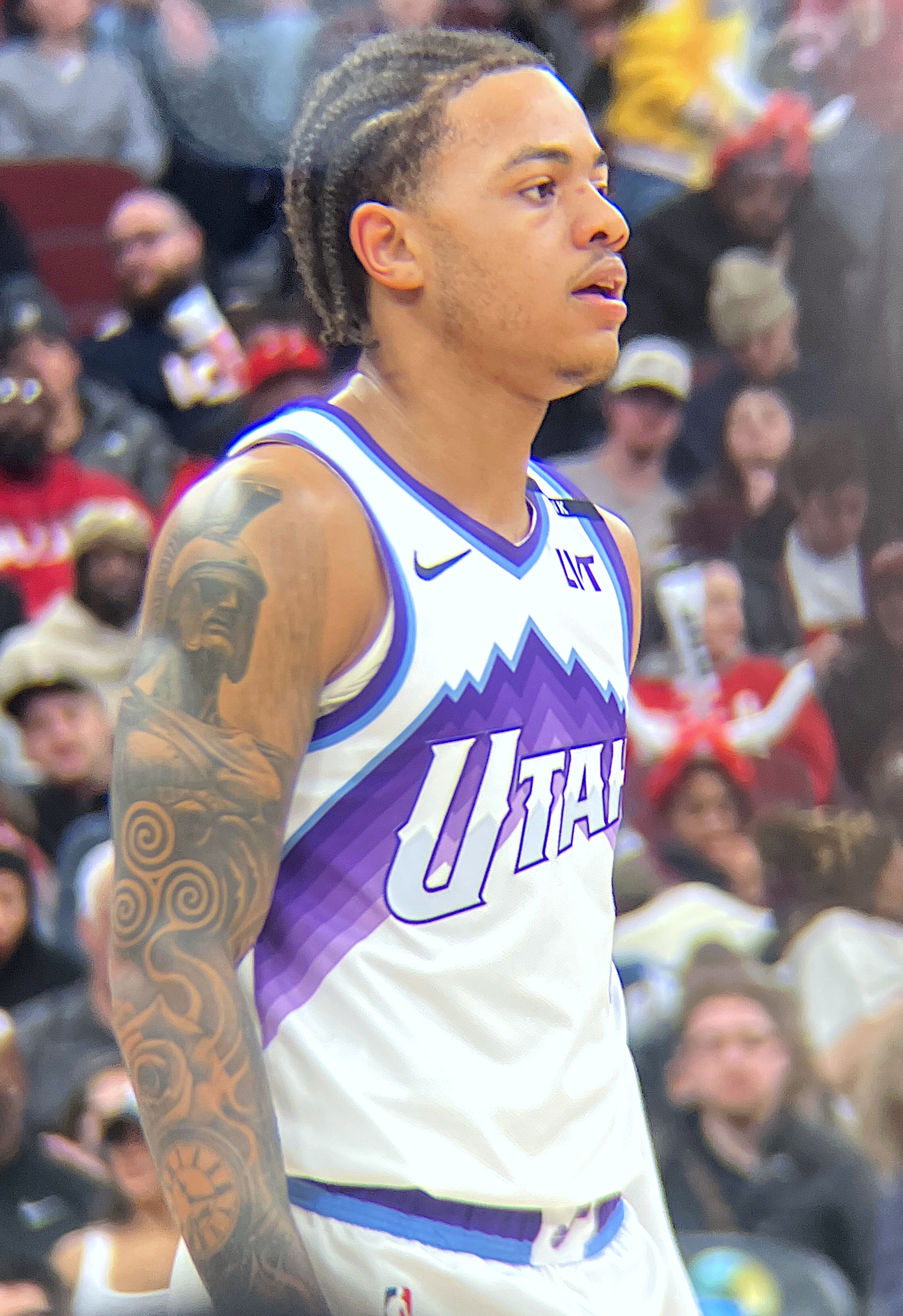
- George with the Utah Jazz in 2026

No. 3 – Utah Jazz
- Position: Point guard
- League: NBA

Personal information
- Born: November 8, 2003 (age 23) Lewisville, Texas, U.S.
- Listed height: 6 ft 5 in (1.96 m)
- Listed weight: 185 lb (84 kg)

Career information
- High school: Lewisville (Lewisville, Texas); IMG Academy (Bradenton, Florida)
- College: Baylor (2022–2023)
- NBA draft: 2023: 1st round, 16th overall pick
- Drafted by: Utah Jazz
- Playing career: 2023–present

Career history
- 2023–present: Utah Jazz

Career highlights
- NBA All-Rookie Second Team (2024); Big 12 Freshman of the Year (2023); Second-team All-Big 12 (2023); Big 12 All-Newcomer Team (2023); Big 12 All-Freshman Team (2023); McDonald's All-American (2022); Nike Hoop Summit (2022); FIBA 3x3 Under-18 World Cup MVP (2021)
- Stats at NBA.com
- Stats at Basketball Reference
Medals
Men's 3x3 basketball
Representing the United States
FIBA 3x3 Under-18 World Cup
Gold medal – first place	2021 Hungary	Team

Keyonte Darnell George (\key-AHN-tay\; born November 8, 2003) is an American professional basketball player for the Utah Jazz of the National Basketball Association (NBA). He played college basketball for the Baylor Bears, earning Big 12 Conference Freshman of the Year in 2023. George was selected by the Jazz with the 16th overall pick in the 2023 NBA draft. He is the son of former professional basketball player Jason Siggers.

== Early life ==
George began playing high school basketball for Lewisville High School in Lewisville, Texas. As a freshman, he averaged 21 points, four rebounds and 1.9 steals per game, and was named District 6-6A Offensive Player of the Year. George averaged 23.9 points, 5.1 rebounds, 2.3 assists and 2.1 steals per game as a sophomore, earning District 6-6A MVP honors. For his junior season, he transferred to iSchool of Lewisville. George averaged 24.8 points per game as a junior. He moved to IMG Academy in Bradenton, Florida for his senior season, where he averaged 17.8 points per game and shot 41% from three-point range. He was the highest-ranked recruit in program history when he committed to Baylor University for the 2023 college basketball season.

George was a consensus five-star recruit and one of the top players in the 2022 class, according to major recruiting services. On August 8, 2021, he committed to playing college basketball for Baylor over offers from Texas, Texas Tech, Kansas and Kentucky.

College recruiting
Name	Hometown	School	Height	Weight	Commit date
Keyonte George; SG	Lewisville, TX	IMG Academy (FL)	6 ft 4 in (1.93 m)	185 lb (84 kg)	Aug 8, 2021
Keyonte George; SG	Recruit ratings: Rivals: 247Sports: ESPN: (93)				
Overall recruit ranking: Rivals: 9 247Sports: 9 ESPN: 6
Note: In many cases, Scout, Rivals, 247Sports, On3, and ESPN may conflict in their listings of height and weight.; In these cases, the average was taken. ESPN grades are on a 100-point scale.; Sources: "Baylor 2022 Basketball Commitments". Rivals.; "2022 Baylor Bears Recruiting Class". ESPN.; "2022 Team Ranking". Rivals.

== College career ==
On January 11, 2023, George scored 32 points in an 83–78 victory over West Virginia. He was named Big 12 Freshman of the Year as well as Second Team All-Big 12. George scored 506 points as a freshman at Baylor, the second most in school history, and holds the program record for the most 20-point games in program history with 20.

== Professional career ==
The Utah Jazz selected George with the sixteenth overall pick in the 2023 NBA draft. After playing shooting guard as a prep and in college, George began playing as a point guard under head coach Will Hardy.

On October 25, 2023, George made his NBA regular season debut against the Sacramento Kings, putting up eight points, two rebounds, and two assists off the bench in a 130–114 loss. On December 2, George scored a then career high 21 points against the Portland Trail Blazers, adding six rebounds and six assists in the game. On December 12, George scored a new career-high 30 points against the Oklahoma City Thunder. On February 4, 2024, George recorded his first career double-double with 19 points and 10 rebounds in a 123–108 win over the Milwaukee Bucks. On November 4, 2024, George tied his career-high of 35 points against the Chicago Bulls. While some speculate that George was benched due to being surpassed by Collier, the move of Collier to the starting lineup allowed Keyonte to return to his role of an off-ball scorer, where he has been thriving.

On December 15, 2025, George recorded 37 points, four rebounds, and six assists in a 140-133 overtime victory over the Dallas Mavericks.

On January 20, 2026, George recorded a career-high 43 points in a 127–122 victory over the Minnesota Timberwolves. He scored 25 points in the first half alone and finished the game shooting 15-of-28 from the field, including six three-pointers. With this performance, George recorded his seventh game of the season with at least 30 points and five three-pointers, tying Bojan Bogdanović for the third-most such games in a single season in Jazz history.

On September 18, 2026, George and the Jazz agreed to a five–year, $157.5 million contract extension.

== National team career ==
George represented the United States at the 2021 FIBA 3x3 Under-18 World Cup in Debrecen, Hungary. He won the gold medal with his teammates: Kyle Filipowski, Gradey Dick and Eric Dailey Jr. George was named World Cup MVP after averaging a tournament-high 8.2 points per game.

== Career statistics ==
Legend
GP	Games played	GS	Games started	MPG	Minutes per game
FG%	Field goal percentage	3P%	3-point field goal percentage	FT%	Free throw percentage
RPG	Rebounds per game	APG	Assists per game	SPG	Steals per game
BPG	Blocks per game	PPG	Points per game	**Bold**	Career high

=== NBA ===
Year	Team	GP	GS	MPG	FG%	3P%	FT%	RPG	APG	SPG	BPG	PPG
2023–24	Utah	**75**	44	27.0	.391	.334	.848	2.8	4.4	.5	.1	13.0
2024–25	Utah	67	35	31.5	.391	.343	.818	**3.8**	5.6	.7	.1	16.8
2025–26	Utah	54	**54**	**33.1**	**.456**	**.371**	**.892**	3.7	**6.1**	**1.1**	**.3**	**23.6**
Career		196	133	30.2	.413	.348	.857	3.4	5.3	.7	.2	17.2

=== College ===
Year	Team	GP	GS	MPG	FG%	3P%	FT%	RPG	APG	SPG	BPG	PPG
2022–23	Baylor	33	33	28.6	.376	.338	.793	4.2	2.8	1.1	.2	15.3
