= Dawson Garcia =

American basketball player (born 2001)

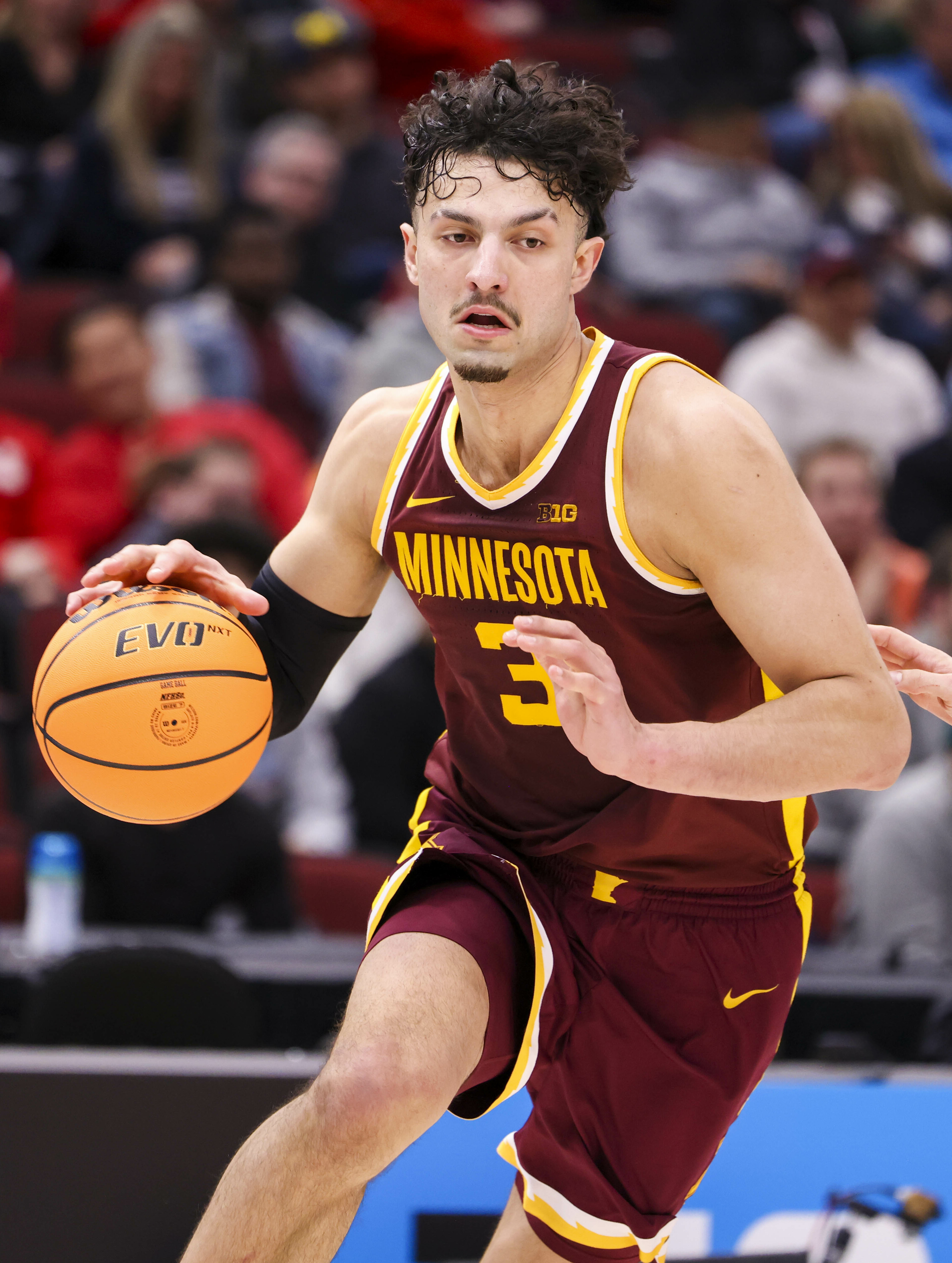
- Garcia with Minnesota in 2023

No. 4 – Motor City Cruise
- Position: Power forward
- League: NBA G League

Personal information
- Born: September 20, 2001 (age 25) Burnsville, Minnesota, U.S.
- Listed height: 6 ft 9 in (2.06 m)
- Listed weight: 235 lb (107 kg)

Career information
- High school: Prior Lake (Savage, Minnesota)
- College: Marquette (2020–2021); North Carolina (2021–2022); Minnesota (2022–2025)
- NBA draft: 2025: undrafted
- Playing career: 2025–present

Career history
- 2025–present: Motor City Cruise

Career highlights
- 2× Second-team All-Big Ten (2024, 2025); Big East All-Freshman Team (2021); McDonald's All-American (2020); FIBA 3x3 Under-18 World Cup MVP (2019)
- Stats at NBA.com
- Stats at Basketball Reference
Medals
Men's 3x3 basketball
Representing United States
FIBA Under-18 World Cup
Gold medal – first place	2019 Mongolia	Team

Dawson Lee Garcia (born September 20, 2001) is an American professional basketball player for the Motor City Cruise of the NBA G League. He played college basketball for the Marquette Golden Eagles, North Carolina Tar Heels, and Minnesota Golden Gophers.

== High school career ==
Garcia attended Prior Lake High School in Savage, Minnesota and was coached by Jon Miller. He averaged 8.8 points per game as a freshman followed by 21.4 points per game as a sophomore. Garcia missed 12 games as a junior. As a junior, Garcia averaged 27.5 points and 11.0 rebounds per game. He helped the team to a school-record 25–4 season and the Minnesota Class 4A, Section 2 championship game. As a senior, he averaged 32 points per game. He was named a McDonald's All-American. He was also one of the five finalists for the Minnesota Mr. Basketball award. Garcia surpassed the 2,000 point milestone on February 24, 2020, finishing with 35 points in a 90–76 victory against Eagan High School.

=== Recruiting ===
Garcia was considered the No. 32 prospect and No. 2 in Minnesota in the class of 2020 by 247Sports. On November 22, 2019, he committed to playing college basketball for Marquette over offers from Minnesota, Indiana, Memphis, Kansas and North Carolina. Garcia chose the Golden Eagles due to his strong relationship with coach Steve Wojciechowski and his staff. Wojciechowski began recruiting Garcia in June 2018, and Garcia took an official visit in February 2019. "I felt like part of their family there," Garcia said of his commitment.

College recruiting
Name	Hometown	School	Height	Weight	Commit date
Dawson Garcia; PF	Prior Lake, MN	Prior Lake (MN)	6 ft 11 in (2.11 m)	220 lb (100 kg)	Nov 20, 2019
Dawson Garcia; PF	Recruit ratings: Rivals: 247Sports: ESPN: (87)				
Overall recruit ranking: Rivals: 43 247Sports: 32 ESPN: 49
Note: In many cases, Scout, Rivals, 247Sports, On3, and ESPN may conflict in their listings of height and weight.; In these cases, the average was taken. ESPN grades are on a 100-point scale.; Sources: "Marquette 2020 Basketball Commitments". Rivals.; "2020 Marquette Golden Eagles Recruiting Class". ESPN.; "2020 Team Ranking". Rivals.

== College career ==
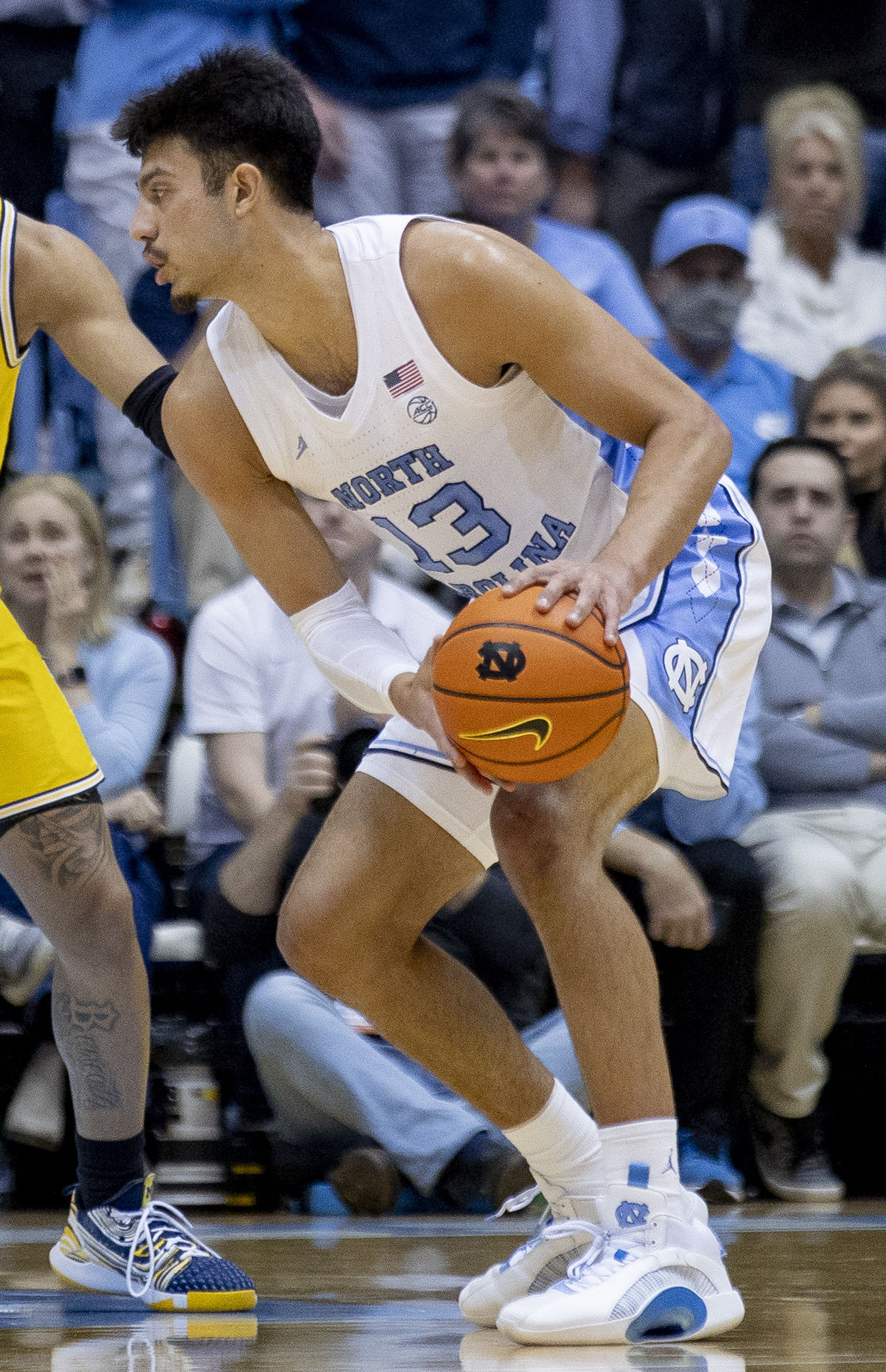
Garcia with North Carolina in 2021

In Garcia's college debut on November 26, 2020, he scored 19 points in a 99–57 win against Arkansas–Pine Bluff. On February 10, 2021, he scored a season-high 28 points against Villanova. Garcia averaged 13 points and a team-high 6.6 rebounds per game. After the season, he declared for the 2021 NBA draft while maintaining his college eligibility. Concurrently, he entered his name into the NCAA's Transfer Portal.

Garcia committed to North Carolina on July 8, 2021. He joined fellow transfers Brady Manek and Justin McKoy as members of head coach Hubert Davis' first Tar Heel team. On January 27, 2022, Garcia took a leave of absence from the team to deal with some family health issues. On February 10, 2022, it was announced that Garcia would miss the rest of the season to be with his family. He averaged nine points and 5.5 rebounds per game in 16 games. Following the season, Garcia entered the transfer portal, citing the family issues of the past year and his desire to be closer to family. On April 18, 2022, Garcia announced his transfer to Minnesota.

== National team career ==
Garcia represented the United States and won its first gold medal in the event at the 2019 FIBA 3x3 Under-18 World Cup in Ulaanbaatar, Mongolia. He was teammates with Nimari Burnett, Devin Askew and Ethan Morton. Garcia accumulated 52 points, tied for the most scored that year, and was named MVP of the World Cup.

== Professional career ==
In the 2025 NBA draft, Garcia went undrafted. On June 27, 2025, Garcia signed an Exhibit 10 contract with the Detroit Pistons.

On September 15, 2026, Garcia signed with the Pistons, but was waived by the team the same day.

== Career statistics ==
Legend
GP	Games played	GS	Games started	MPG	Minutes per game
FG%	Field goal percentage	3P%	3-point field goal percentage	FT%	Free throw percentage
RPG	Rebounds per game	APG	Assists per game	SPG	Steals per game
BPG	Blocks per game	PPG	Points per game	**Bold**	Career high

=== College ===
Year	Team	GP	GS	MPG	FG%	3P%	FT%	RPG	APG	SPG	BPG	PPG
2020–21	Marquette	27	27	29.7	.480	.356	.783	6.6	.8	.3	.5	13.0
2021–22	North Carolina	16	12	20.6	.405	**.375**	.792	5.5	.7	.4	.3	9.0
2022–23	Minnesota	26	26	31.8	.457	.345	.714	6.7	**2.2**	.7	.7	15.3
2023–24	Minnesota	31	31	32.0	**.486**	.319	**.802**	6.7	1.6	**.8**	**1.0**	17.6
2024–25	Minnesota	**32**	**32**	**35.3**	.474	.373	.783	**7.5**	2.0	.7	.8	**19.2**
Career		132	128	30.9	.469	.353	.778	6.7	1.5	.6	.7	15.5
