= 2020 McDonald's All-American Boys Game =

American high school basketball game

West	East
- Date: April 1, 2020 (canceled)
- Venue: Toyota Center, Houston, Texas
- Network: ESPN & ESPN2

McDonald's All-American

The 2020 McDonald's All-American Boys Game was an all-star basketball game that was scheduled to be played on Wednesday, April 1, 2020, at the Toyota Center in Houston, Texas, home of the Houston Rockets. The game's rosters featured the best and most highly recruited high school boys graduating in the class of 2020. The game would have been the 43rd annual version of the McDonald's All-American Game first played in 1977. Due to the impact of the COVID-19 pandemic, the game was cancelled.

The 24 players were selected from 2,500 nominees by a committee of basketball experts. They were chosen not only for their on-court skills, but for their performances off the court as well.

== Rosters ==
When the rosters were announced on January 23, 2020, North Carolina had the most selections with four, while Duke had three, and Kentucky had two. At the announcement of roster selections, only 14 schools were represented and had 4 players uncommitted. The official East and West sides were not announced for a couple weeks.

=== Team East ===
ESPN 100 Rank	Name	Height (ft-in)	Weight (lbs)	Position	Hometown	High school	College choice
4	Scottie Barnes	6–8	210	PF	West Palm Beach, Florida	Montverde Academy	Florida State
8	Terrence Clarke	6–7	190	SF	Boston, Massachusetts	Brewster Academy	Kentucky
19	Sharife Cooper	6–1	165	PG	Powder Springs, Georgia	McEachern High School	Auburn
3	Cade Cunningham	6–7	215	PG	Arlington, Texas	Montverde Academy	Oklahoma State
39	R. J. Davis	6–1	165	PG	White Plains, New York	Archbishop Stepinac High School	North Carolina
43	Dawson Garcia	6–9	210	PF	Prior Lake, Minnesota	Prior Lake High School	Marquette
18	Jeremy Roach	6–2	180	PG	Leesburg, Virginia	Paul VI Catholic High School	Duke
11	Day'Ron Sharpe	6–9	225	C	Winterville, North Carolina	Montverde Academy	North Carolina
16	Jaden Springer	6–5	210	SG	Charlotte, North Carolina	IMG Academy	Tennessee
27	Bryce Thompson	6–4	167	SG	Tulsa, Oklahoma	Booker T. Washington High School	Kansas
13	Isaiah Todd	6–9	215	PF	Richmond, Virginia	Word of God Christian Academy	—
28	Mark Williams	7–0	230	C	Norfolk, Virginia	IMG Academy	Duke

=== Team West ===
ESPN 100 Rank	Name	Height (ft-in)	Weight (lbs)	Position	Hometown	High school	College choice
6	Brandon Boston Jr.	6-6	175	SF	Norcross, Georgia	Sierra Canyon School	Kentucky
9	Greg Brown	6–8	205	PF	Austin, Texas	Vandegrift High School	Texas
21	Nimari Burnett	6–3	190	SG	Chicago, Illinois	Prolific Prep	Texas Tech
10	Josh Christopher	6–4	205	SG	Lakewood, California	Mayfair High School	Arizona State
1	Jalen Green	6–4	186	SG	Fresno, California	Prolific Prep	—
14	Walker Kessler	6–11	220	C	Newnan, Georgia	Woodward Academy	North Carolina
17	Caleb Love	6–3	180	PG	St. Louis, Missouri	Christian Brothers College High School	North Carolina
2	Evan Mobley	7–0	205	C	Temecula, California	Rancho Christian School	USC
20	Daishen Nix	6–3	190	PG	Fairbanks, Alaska	Trinity International School	—
23	DJ Steward	6–3	160	SG	Chicago, Illinois	Whitney M. Young Magnet High School	Duke
5	Jalen Suggs	6–4	195	PG	Saint Paul, Minnesota	Minnehaha Academy	Gonzaga
7	Ziaire Williams	6–8	180	SF	Lancaster, California	Sierra Canyon School	Stanford

^undecided at the time of roster selection
^{~}undecided at game time
