= Agasthi Jayatilaka =

Sri Lankan–American musician and martial artist

- Also known as: Agusthi; Agasthi Gus
- Born: Agasthi Rajitha Jayatilaka; March 30, 1998 (age 28); Minneapolis, Minnesota, U.S.
- Origin: Los Angeles, California, U.S.
- Genres: Pop, R&B, alternative R&B, soul
- Occupations: Singer; Songwriter; Musician; Taekwondo instructor
- Instruments: Vocals, Clarinet, Saxophone
- Years active: 2024–present
- Label: Independent

Agasthi Rajitha Jayatilaka (/ˈɑː.ɡəs.tiː/ AH-gus-tee; born March 30, 1998), known professionally as Agusthi, is a Sri Lankan–American former martial arts world champion and musician based in Los Angeles, California.

== Early life and education ==
Agasthi Jayatilaka was born on March 30, 1998, in Minneapolis, Minnesota, to Sri Lankan immigrant parents. His father graduated from the University of Texas at Austin and the University of Minnesota–Twin Cities, while his mother is also an alumna of the University of Minnesota–Twin Cities. Agasthi Jayatilaka graduated from Prior Lake High School in Savage, Minnesota.

He attended the University of Minnesota's Carlson School of Management, where he earned a Bachelor of Science in Business.

== Career ==
=== Martial arts ===
Jayatilaka trained in Taekwondo from a young age, eventually earning a 4th Degree Black Belt. He became a four-time ATA World Champion (2010, 2012, 2015, 2016) and was also a 2012 ESPN Invitational finalist. He is currently also a certified taekwondo instructor with the ATA.

=== Music ===
In 2024, Jayatilaka began pursuing music professionally under the stage name Agusthi. He was also previously known under the stage name Agasthi Gus. His music blends pop, R&B, and alternative music. Jayatilaka collaborated with Los Angeles-based producer Eli Feier to develop music that fuses R&B, pop, soul, and electronic music. His musical influences include Prince, Michael Jackson, Mariah Carey, SZA, Lady Gaga, Bruno Mars, Erykah Badu, and Nicki Minaj.

Agusthi released his debut single "Pursue" in July 2025, followed by "3 Questions" in November 2025.

In 2025, he joined Flagstar Bank as a mortgage consultant.

== Discography ==
Singles

- "Pursue" (2025)
- "3 Questions" (2025)

== Personal life ==
Jayatilaka currently resides in Los Angeles, California.

== Awards and recognition ==
- 5× ATA World Champion (2010, 2012, 2015, 2016)
- 2012 ESPN Invitational finalist
- Wells Fargo Diamond Performer (2021, 2023)
- President's Club Award (2023)
- Leader's Club Sales Conference (2022)
