= FIBA 3x3 U18 World Cup =

Annual basketball tournament

- Current season, competition or edition: 2024 FIBA 3x3 U18 World Cup
- Sport: 3x3 basketball
- Founded: 2011
- Founder: FIBA
- First season: 2011
- No. of teams: 12
- Continent: FIBA (International)
- Most recent champions: M: United States (3rd title); W: United States (8th title)
- Most titles: M: United States (3 titles); W: United States (8 titles)
- Related competitions: FIBA 3x3 World Cup
- Website: Official website

The FIBA 3x3 U18 World Cup is an 3x3 under-18 basketball tournament run by the International Basketball Federation (FIBA) since 2011. The tournament was known as the FIBA 3x3 U18 World Championships until the 2016 edition.

== History ==
The event was held for the first time in Rimini, Italy, in September 2011 and has been held annually since then.

The tournament was not held in 2014 and 2018 due to 3x3 basketball being an event at the 2014 Summer Youth Olympics and 2018 Summer Youth Olympics. In 2020, it was not held due to COVID-19 pandemic.

== Results ==
=== Men's tournament ===
Year	Host	Final			Third place match		
Year	Host	Champion	Score	Second place	Third place	Score	Fourth place
2011; Details	(Italy); Rimini	New Zealand	19–18	Bulgaria	Italy	21–13	Estonia
2012; Details	(Spain); Alcobendas	Serbia	21–20	United States	France	19–11	Canada
2013; Details	(Indonesia); Jakarta	Argentina	13–7	France	Russia	19–16	Lithuania
2015; Details	(Hungary); Debrecen	New Zealand	20–18	Argentina	France	16–13	Spain
2016; Details	(Kazakhstan); Astana	Qatar	20–12	Brazil	Italy	21–14	New Zealand
2017; Details	(China); Chengdu	Belgium	17–12	Netherlands	Slovenia	21–17	New Zealand
2019; Details	(Mongolia); Ulaanbaatar	United States	16–12	Turkey	Argentina	21–18	Russia
2021; Details	(Hungary); Debrecen	United States	21–14	Estonia	Belarus	21–9	Egypt
2022; Details	(Hungary); Debrecen	France	21–17	Serbia	Lithuania	18–17	Ukraine
2023; Details	(Hungary); Debrecen	Germany	20–18	France	Slovenia	16–15	Estonia
2024; Details	(Hungary); Debrecen; Hajdú–Bihar County	United States	21–13	Spain	France	21–12	Ukraine

=== Women's tournament ===
Year	Host	Final			Third place match		
Year	Host	Champion	Score	Second place	Third place	Score	Fourth place
2011; Details	(Italy); Rimini	Spain	16–15	Italy	Japan	w/o	United States
2012; Details	(Spain); Alcobendas	United States	21–13	Spain	Australia	16–14	Italy
2013; Details	(Indonesia); Jakarta	United States	21–12	Estonia	Spain	14–7	Italy
2015; Details	(Hungary); Debrecen	France	20–19	United States	Hungary	14–11	Israel
2016; Details	(Kazakhstan); Astana	France	21–12	United States	Spain	18–12	Czech Republic
2017; Details	(China); Chengdu	United States	21–14	Czech Republic	Russia	12–8	Hungary
2019; Details	(Mongolia); Ulaanbaatar	United States	19–13	New Zealand	France	15–13	China
2021; Details	(Hungary); Debrecen	United States	21–14	Spain	Hungary	19–13	Germany
2022; Details	(Hungary); Debrecen	United States	21–11	Germany	Spain	16–14	France
2023; Details	(Hungary); Debrecen	United States	22–16	France	Japan	21–11	Lithuania
2024; Details	(Hungary); Debrecen; Hajdú–Bihar County	United States	21–19	Japan	China	21–17	Germany

== Statistics ==
=== Medal table ===
Rank	Nation	Gold	Silver	Bronze	Total
1	United States (USA)	11	3	0	14
2	France (FRA)	3	3	4	10
3	New Zealand (NZL)	2	1	0	3
4	Spain (ESP)	1	3	3	7
5	Argentina (ARG)	1	1	1	3
6	Germany (GER)	1	1	0	2
6	Serbia (SRB)	1	1	0	2
8	Belgium (BEL)	1	0	0	1
8	Qatar (QAT)	1	0	0	1
10	Estonia (EST)	0	2	0	2
11	Italy (ITA)	0	1	2	3
11	Japan (JPN)	0	1	2	3
13	Brazil (BRA)	0	1	0	1
13	Bulgaria (BUL)	0	1	0	1
13	Czech Republic (CZE)	0	1	0	1
13	Netherlands (NED)	0	1	0	1
13	Turkey (TUR)	0	1	0	1
18	Hungary (HUN)	0	0	2	2
18	Russia (RUS)	0	0	2	2
18	Slovenia (SLO)	0	0	2	2
21	Australia (AUS)	0	0	1	1
21	Belarus (BLR)	0	0	1	1
21	China (CHN)	0	0	1	1
21	Lithuania (LIT)	0	0	1	1
Totals (24 entries)		22	22	22	66

=== Participating teams ===
==== Men's teams ====
Nation	(Italy) 2011	(Spain) 2012	(Indonesia) 2013	(Hungary) 2015	(Kazakhstan) 2016	(China) 2017	(Mongolia) 2019	(Hungary) 2021	(Hungary) 2022	(Hungary) 2023	(Hungary) 2024
Andorra	-	-	31st	18th	13th	-	-	-	-	-	-
Angola	-	31st	-	-	-	-	-	-	-	-	-
Argentina	-	-	1st	2nd	5th	-	3rd	-	-	-	-
Australia	-	20th	-	-	-	-	-	-	-	-	-
Austria	27th	-	-	-	-	-	-	-	-	-	-
Bahrain	-	-	-	-	-	17th	-	-	20th	-	-
Belarus	-	-	-	-	-	-	18th	3rd	DSQ	-	-
Belgium	-	-	-	-	12th	1st	-	-	-	-	-
Belize	-	16th	19th	-	-	-	-	-	-	-	-
Brazil	-	22nd	23rd	10th	2nd	-	11th	11th	10th	13th	10th
Bulgaria	2nd	9th	15th	-	-	-	-	-	-	-	-
Canada	7th	4th	12th	-	-	-	-	-	-	-	-
Chile	-	-	-	-	-	-	-	-	18th	-	-
China	-	23rd	6th	-	14th	9th	14th	-	-	-	-
Chinese Taipei	-	-	22nd	-	-	-	-	-	-	-	-
Croatia	26th	-	-	-	-	-	-	-	-	-	7th
DR Congo	-	-	-	-	-	-	-	-	-	20th	-
Czech Republic	14th	-	13th	-	-	-	-	-	-	-	-
Denmark	23rd	-	-	-	-	-	-	-	-	-	-
Dominican Republic	-	-	-	-	-	-	15th	7th	17th	-	-
Egypt	19th	-	-	14th	20th	-	-	4th	13th	6th	13th
England	25th	-	-	-	-	-	-	-	-	-	-
Estonia	4th	7th	29th	19th	-	-	12th	2nd	14th	4th	14th
France	-	3rd	2nd	3rd	-	-	-	-	1st	2nd	3rd
Georgia	-	-	-	20th	8th	13th	13th	-	-	-	-
Germany	17th	21st	10th	11th	-	-	-	15th	8th	1st	5th
Greece	15th	-	-	-	-	-	-	-	-	-	-
Guam	34th	-	-	-	-	-	-	-	-	-	-
Guatemala	-	-	32nd	21st	-	-	-	-	-	-	-
Hungary	-	26th	30th	13th	15th	6th	-	14th	16th	10th	8th
India	29th	-	-	-	-	-	-	-	-	12th	-
Indonesia	-	-	28th	23rd	16th	14th	-	18th	-	-	-
Israel	-	11th	-	-	-	10th	-	13th	-	8th	-
Italy	3rd	15th	21st	-	3rd	-	8th	-	-	-	-
Japan	31st	-	-	-	-	-	-	-	-	9th	-
Jordan	16th	29th	-	-	-	20th	20th	-	-	-	-
Kazakhstan	-	25th	-	22nd	11th	-	17th	8th	15th	-	-
Kyrgyzstan	-	-	-	-	-	-	19th	-	12th	16th	16th
Latvia	10th	13th	14th	-	-	-	9th	17th	5th	5th	6th
Lithuania	-	14th	4th	6th	-	-	-	6th	3rd	-	-
Morocco	-	-	-	-	-	-	-	-	-	19th	15th
Mongolia	-	-	-	-	-	-	6th	12th	9th	14th	-
Nepal	35th	-	-	-	-	-	-	-	-	-	-
Netherlands	32nd	30th	-	-	10th	2nd	-	-	-	-	-
New Zealand	1st	8th	17th	1st	4th	4th	-	-	-	-	-
Philippines	-	-	18th	17th	17th	7th	-	-	-	-	-
Poland	-	17th	8th	9th	-	15th	-	-	-	-	-
Portugal	-	-	-	-	-	-	-	-	7th	-	-
Puerto Rico	11th	-	5th	16th	-	-	-	-	-	-	-
Qatar	36th	-	24th	-	1st	12th	-	-	-	7th	17th
Romania	21st	6th	25th	7th	19th	8th	7th	16th	-	-	-
Russia	6th	5th	3rd	5th	-	-	4th	9th	-	-	-
Serbia	6th	1st	-	-	-	-	-	-	2nd	11th	-
Singapore	30th	28th	-	-	-	-	-	-	-	-	-
Slovakia	-	27th	27th	-	-	-	-	-	-	-	-
Slovenia	33rd	18th	-	-	7th	3rd	10th	10th	6th	3rd	9th
South Africa	28th	-	-	-	-	-	-	-	-	-	-
South Korea	18th	-	-	-	-	19th	-	-	-	-	-
Spain	13th	10th	7th	4th	9th	-	-	-	-	-	2nd
Sri Lanka	22nd	-	-	-	-	-	-	-	-	-	-
Switzerland	-	12th	11th	-	-	-	-	-	-	-	-
Syria	24th	-	-	-	-	-	-	-	-	-	-
Thailand	-	-	20th	-	-	-	-	-	-	19th	12th
Trinidad and Tobago	-	-	-	-	-	-	-	-	19th	-	-
Tunisia	9th	32nd	-	-	-	-	-	-	-	17th	-
Turkey	12th	24th	16th	15th	18th	16th	2nd	-	-	-	-
Turkmenistan	-	-	-	-	-	18th	16th	-	-	-	-
Uganda	-	-	-	-	-	11th	-	-	-	-	-
Ukraine	20th	-	-	-	-	5th	5th	5th	4th	15th	4th
United States	8th	2nd	9th	8th	-	-	1st	1st	11th	-	1st
Uruguay	-	-	-	12th	6th	-	-	-	-	-	-
Uzbekistan	-	-	-	-	-	-	-	-	-	-	11th
Venezuela	-	19th	26th	-	-	-	-	-	-	-	-
Vietnam	-	-	-	24th	-	-	-	-	-	-	-

==== Women's teams ====
Nation	(Italy) 2011	(Spain) 2012	(Indonesia) 2013	(Hungary) 2015	(Kazakhstan) 2016	(China) 2017	(Mongolia) 2019	(Hungary) 2021	(Hungary) 2022	(Hungary) 2023	(Hungary) 2024
Andorra	-	19th	19th	24th	12th	14th	-	-	-	-	-
Angola	14th	-	-	-	-	-	-	-	-	-	-
Argentina	-	-	-	-	-	15th	-	-	-	-	-
Australia	5th	3rd	-	-	-	11th	-	-	-	-	-
Austria	17th	-	-	-	-	-	-	-	-	-	-
Belarus	-	-	-	-	-	-	-	9th	DSQ	-	-
Belgium	-	-	11th	7th	-	-	12th	-	-	-	-
Brazil	-	15th	15th	14th	-	-	-	-	8th	17th	-
Bulgaria	-	-	12th	-	-	-	-	-	-	-	-
Canada	8th	14th	9th	-	-	-	-	-	-	-	-
Chile	-	-	-	-	-	-	-	-	12th	10th	-
China	9th	9th	17th	5th	7th	7th	4th	-	-	-	3rd
Chinese Taipei	-	21st	13th	-	-	-	-	-	-	9th	-
Czech Republic	7th	10th	8th	10th	4th	2nd	13th	-	-	-	-
Egypt	-	-	-	16th	9th	16th	14th	14th	9th	6th	14th
England	12th	7th	7th	-	-	-	-	-	-	-	-
Estonia	-	8th	2nd	17th	-	-	-	8th	-	-	-
France	-	6th	5th	1st	1st	6th	3rd	-	4th	2nd	9th
Germany	13th	-	-	8th	16th	8th	-	4th	2nd	11th	4th
Great Britain	-	-	-	-	-	-	-	-	17th	-	-
Greece	19th	-	-	-	-	-	-	-	-	-	-
Guam	24th	22nd	24th	22nd	-	-	-	-	-	-	-
Guatemala	-	-	-	-	19th	-	-	-	-	-	-
Hong Kong	-	20th	-	-	-	-	-	-	-	-	-
Hungary	-	-	-	3rd	6th	4th	11th	3rd	11th	16th	13th
India	16th	-	-	-	-	-	-	-	-	-	15th
Indonesia	-	-	21st	23rd	-	-	6th	17th	-	-	-
Israel	-	-	-	4th	13th	-	-	11th	-	-	-
Italy	2nd	4th	4th	6th	10th	9th	-	-	-	-	-
Japan	3rd	-	-	-	-	13th	5th	-	5th	3rd	2nd
Jordan	21st	23rd	-	-	-	-	-	-	-	-	-
Kazakhstan	-	-	-	-	15th	12th	-	-	-	-	-
Kyrgyzstan	-	-	-	-	-	-	-	-	20th	-	12th
Latvia	-	-	-	-	-	-	-	6th	15th	7th	16th
Lithuania	-	5th	10th	-	-	-	-	-	-	4th	-
Malaysia	-	-	-	-	-	-	-	-	-	18th	-
Mexico	-	-	-	-	-	-	7th	-	14th	-	8th
Mongolia	-	-	-	-	-	-	16th	15th	13th	8th	-
Morocco	-	-	-	-	-	-	-	-	-	19th	17th
Netherlands	18th	12th	20th	9th	8th	10th	17th	10th	6th	-	-
New Zealand	-	-	22nd	12th	5th	-	2nd	-	16th	-	10th
Philippines	-	-	-	-	-	-	8th	-	-	-	-
Poland	-	16th	-	15th	11th	-	19th	-	18th	5th	7th
Puerto Rico	-	-	16th	-	-	-	-	-	-	-	-
Romania	-	11th	18th	21st	-	-	18th	13th	10th	-	-
Russia	10th	-	-	-	-	3rd	15th	5th	-	-	-
Singapore	-	-	-	-	-	20th	-	-	-	-	-
Slovakia	-	-	-	19th	-	-	-	-	-	-	-
Slovenia	-	-	-	-	-	-	-	12th	-	-	-
Spain	1st	2nd	3rd	11th	3rd	5th	-	2nd	3rd	12th	6th
Sri Lanka	20th	17th	-	-	-	19th	20th	-	-	-	-
Sweden	6th	-	-	-	-	-	-	-	-	-	-
Switzerland	-	18th	-	13th	-	18th	10th	16th	-	-	-
Syria	23rd	-	-	-	-	-	-	-	-	-	-
Thailand	-	-	14th	-	-	-	-	-	-	14th	11th
Tunisia	22nd	24th	23rd	-	14th	-	-	-	-	13th	-
Turkey	11th	13th	-	18th	17th	-	-	-	-	-	-
Turkmenistan	-	-	-	-	-	-	-	-	-	-	18th
Ukraine	15th	-	6th	-	-	-	9th	7th	7th	15th	5th
United Arab Emirates	-	-	-	-	20th	-	-	-	-	-	-
United States	4th	1st	1st	2nd	2nd	1st	1st	1st	1st	1st	1st
Uzbekistan	-	-	-	-	-	-	-	-	19th	-	-
Venezuela	-	-	-	20th	18th	17th	-	-	-	-	-

== Individual contests ==
=== Dunk contest ===
Year	Host	(gold) Gold	(silver) Silver	(bronze) Bronze
2011	(Italy) Rimini	(Canada) Dyshawn Pierre	(Czech Republic) Dalibor Fait	(Bulgaria) Alex Simeonov
2011	(Italy) Rimini	(Canada) Dyshawn Pierre	(Czech Republic) Dalibor Fait	(Denmark) Alexander Birketoft
2012	(Spain) Alcobendas	(Germany) Terry Thomas	(Estonia) Martin Jurtom	(United States) Rondae Jefferson
2012	(Spain) Alcobendas	(Germany) Terry Thomas	(Estonia) Martin Jurtom	(Switzerland) Cyril Baechler
2013	(Indonesia) Jakarta	(Philippines) Kobe Paras	(Spain) Antonio Morales	(United States) Demonte Flannigan
2013	(Indonesia) Jakarta	(Philippines) Kobe Paras	(Spain) Antonio Morales	(China) Sun Ming Hui
2015	(Hungary) Debrecen	(Philippines) Kobe Paras	(United States) Jalek Felton	(Uruguay) Agustin da Costa
2016	(Kazakhstan) Astana	(Belgium) Zaccharie Mortant	(Spain) Alberto Perez	(Slovenia) Urban Oman
2016	(Kazakhstan) Astana	(Belgium) Zaccharie Mortant	(Spain) Alberto Perez	(Hungary) Krisztofer Durazi
2017	(China) Chengdu	(Belgium) Vincent Peeters	(Philippines) Florencio Serrano	(United States) Matej Susec
2019	(Mongolia) Ulaanbaatar	(Dominican Republic) Fuhit Edouard	(United States) Nimari Burnett	(Belarus) Aliaksei Navoichyk
2021	(Hungary) Debrecen	(United States) Eric Dailey Jr.	(Lithuania) Mintautas Mockus	(Dominican Republic) Breylin García
2022	(Hungary) Debrecen	Not held		
2023	(Hungary) Debrecen	Not held		
2024	(Hungary) Debrecen	Not held		

Source: FIBA

=== Shoot-out ===
Year	Host	(gold) Gold	(silver) Silver	(bronze) Bronze
2011	(Italy) Rimini	(Bulgaria) Tencho Tenchev (Boys) (Greece) Vasiliki Tarla (Girls)	(Guam) Jarred Meno (Boys) (Russia) Zhanna Byazrova (Girls)	(Estonia) Rait Laane, (India) Loveneet Singh (Boys)
2011	(Italy) Rimini	(Bulgaria) Tencho Tenchev (Boys) (Greece) Vasiliki Tarla (Girls)	(Guam) Jarred Meno (Boys) (Russia) Zhanna Byazrova (Girls)	(Australia) Olivia Thompson, (Sri Lanka) Lokuk Perera (Girls)
2012	(Spain) Alcobendas	(Belize) Treevanne Moses	(Poland) Monika Naczk	(Lithuania) Justinas Gecas (3rd)
2012	(Spain) Alcobendas	(Belize) Treevanne Moses	(Poland) Monika Naczk	(Italy) Elisa Penna (4th)
2013	(Indonesia) Jakarta	(Bulgaria) Teodora Dineva	(Guam) Gemilie Ilao	(Poland) Adam Siewruk (3rd)
2013	(Indonesia) Jakarta	(Bulgaria) Teodora Dineva	(Guam) Gemilie Ilao	(Czech Republic) Marek Hájek (4th)
2015	(Hungary) Debrecen	(France) Bathiste Tchouaffé	(Spain) Lucía Alonso	(Italy) Giulia Ciavarella
2016	(Kazakhstan) Astana	(Poland) Weronika Nowakowska	(New Zealand) Hamish McDonald	(Hungary) Robert Füzi
2017	(China) Chengdu	(Netherlands) Calvin Poulina	(Ukraine) Vitaliy Shorstkiy	(Japan) Maaya Inoue
2019	(Mongolia) Ulaanbaatar	(Latvia) Ramza Everts	(Mexico) Karina Esquer	(Japan) Shimizu Sakura
2021	(Hungary) Debrecen	(Spain) Marta Morales	(Latvia) Enija Kivite	(Lithuania) Emilis Butkus
2022	(Hungary) Debrecen	Not held		
2023	(Hungary) Debrecen	Not held		
2024	(Hungary) Debrecen	Not held		

Source: FIBA

== See also ==
- FIBA 3x3 World Cup
- FIBA 3x3 U23 World Cup
