= 2023–24 Michigan Wolverines men's basketball team =

American college basketball season

2023–24 Michigan Wolverines men's basketball
- Conference: Big Ten Conference
- Record: 8–24 (3–17 Big Ten)
- Head coach: Juwan Howard (5th season)
- Assistant coaches: Saddi Washington (8th season); Phil Martelli (5th season); Howard Eisley (5th season)
- Captains: Jace Howard; Olivier Nkamhoua
- Home arena: Crisler Center

2023–24 Big Ten Conference men's basketball standings
	Conf.				Overall
Team	W		L	PCT	W		L	PCT
No. 2 Purdue	17	–	3	.850	34	–	5	.872
No. 6 Illinois †	14	–	6	.700	29	–	9	.763
Nebraska	12	–	8	.600	23	–	11	.676
Northwestern	12	–	8	.600	22	–	12	.647
Wisconsin	11	–	9	.550	22	–	14	.611
Indiana	10	–	10	.500	19	–	14	.576
Iowa	10	–	10	.500	19	–	15	.559
Michigan State	10	–	10	.500	20	–	15	.571
Minnesota	9	–	11	.450	19	–	15	.559
Ohio State	9	–	11	.450	22	–	14	.611
Penn State	9	–	11	.450	16	–	17	.485
Maryland	7	–	13	.350	16	–	17	.485
Rutgers	7	–	13	.350	15	–	17	.469
Michigan	3	–	17	.150	8	–	24	.250
† 2024 Big Ten tournament winner Rankings from AP poll

The 2023–24 Michigan Wolverines men's basketball team represented the University of Michigan during the 2023–24 NCAA Division I men's basketball season. The season marked the program's 108th season and its 107th consecutive year as a member of the Big Ten Conference. The Wolverines were led by fifth-year head coach Juwan Howard and played their home games for the 57th consecutive year at Crisler Center in Ann Arbor, Michigan. The Michigan Wolverines men's basketball team drew an average home attendance of 11,496 in 2023-24, the 29th highest in college basketball.

The Wolverines finished the season with an 8–24 record, the most losses in program history. They also finished with the second-worst winning percentage in school history, behind the 1959–60 team's 4–20 season. Juwan Howard was fired following the conclusion of the season.

== Previous season ==
The Wolverines finished the 2022–23 season 18–16, 11–9 in Big Ten play to finish in a tie for fifth place. As the No. 8 seed in the Big Ten tournament, they lost to Rutgers in the second round. The Wolverines received an at-large bid to the National Invitation Tournament as the No. 3 seed where they defeated Toledo in the first round before losing to Vanderbilt in the second round.

== Offseason ==
=== Departures ===
On March 23, 2023, freshman forward Jett Howard announced he would forgo his remaining eligibility and declared for the 2023 NBA draft. On March 31, junior big man Hunter Dickinson announced he was entering the transfer portal, he later announced he would transfer to Kansas. On April 2, sophomore guard Kobe Bufkin declared for the NBA draft. On April 6, sophomore guard Isaiah Barnes announced he was transferring to Tulsa. On April 11, graduate student Joey Baker announced he would sign with an agent and pursue a professional career. On May 2, freshman forward Gregg Glenn announced he was transferring to Tulane.

Michigan Departures
Name	Number	Pos.	Height	Weight	Year	Hometown	Reason for departure
Isaiah Barnes	11	G	6'7"	200	So	Chicago, IL	Transferred to Tulsa
Jackson Selvala	34	F	6'8"	225	Sr	New Canaan, CT	Graduated
Jett Howard	13	F	6'8"	215	Fr	Chicago, IL	Declared for NBA draft
Hunter Dickinson	1	C	7'1"	260	Jr	Alexandria, VA	Transferred to Kansas
Kobe Bufkin	2	G	6'4"	195	So	Grand Rapids, MI	Declared for NBA draft
Joey Baker	15	F	6'7"	205	GS	Fayetteville, NC	Graduated
Gregg Glenn	23	F	6'7"	230	Fr	Fort Lauderdale, FL	Transferred to Tulane

=== Acquisitions ===
==== Incoming transfers ====
After much speculation, point guard Caleb Love originally committed to play his senior season at Michigan. However, just over a month later after committing to Michigan, Love decommitted from the Wolverines and headed back into transfer portal, reportedly due to an issue with transfer credits.

Michigan incoming transfers
Name	Number	Pos.	Height	Weight	Year	Hometown	Previous School
Nimari Burnett	4	SG	6'3"	190	GS	Chicago, Illinois	Alabama
Tray Jackson	2	PF	6'10"	210	GS	Detroit, Michigan	Seton Hall
Olivier Nkamhoua	13	SF	6'8"	205	GS	Helsinki, Finland	Tennessee

=== Recruiting classes ===
On October 20, 2022, Michigan received its first class of 2023 commitment from four-star center Papa Kante. On November 1, 2022, Michigan received its second commitment of the 2023 class, four-star shooting guard George Washington III. On April 18, 2023, Kante announced that he requested a release from his National Letter of Intent (NLI) so he could re-open his recruitment.

==== 2023 recruiting class ====
College recruiting
Name	Hometown	School	Height	Weight	Commit date
George Washington III; SG	Dayton, OH	Chaminade Julienne	6 ft 2 in (1.88 m)	175 lb (79 kg)	Nov 1, 2022
George Washington III; SG	Recruit ratings: Rivals: 247Sports: ESPN: (82)				
Overall recruit ranking: Rivals: 56 247Sports: 73
Note: In many cases, Scout, Rivals, 247Sports, On3, and ESPN may conflict in their listings of height and weight.; In these cases, the average was taken. ESPN grades are on a 100-point scale.; Sources: "Michigan 2023 Basketball Commitments". Rivals.; "2023 Michigan Wolverines Recruiting Class". ESPN.; "2023 Team Ranking". Rivals.

==== 2024 recruiting class ====
College recruiting (2024)
Name	Hometown	School	Height	Weight	Commit date
Christian Anderson; G	Atlanta, GA	Lovett	5 ft 11 in (1.80 m)	155 lb (70 kg)	Oct 6, 2021
Christian Anderson; G	Recruit ratings: Rivals: 247Sports:				
Durral Brooks; PG	Grand Rapids, MI	Catholic Central	6 ft 2 in (1.88 m)	180 lb (82 kg)	May 14, 2023
Durral Brooks; PG	Recruit ratings: Rivals: 247Sports: (82)				
Khani Rooths; PF	Rockville, MD	IMG Academy	6 ft 8 in (2.03 m)	200 lb (91 kg)	Nov 12, 2023
Khani Rooths; PF	Recruit ratings: Rivals: 247Sports: ESPN: (90)				
Overall recruit ranking: 247Sports: 17
Note: In many cases, Scout, Rivals, 247Sports, On3, and ESPN may conflict in their listings of height and weight.; In these cases, the average was taken. ESPN grades are on a 100-point scale.; Sources: "Michigan 2024 Basketball Commitments". Rivals.; "2024 Team Ranking". Rivals.

== Roster ==
2023–24 Michigan Wolverines men's basketball team
Players
Coaches

Pos.	#	Name	Height	Weight	Year	Previous school	Hometown
G	0	Dug McDaniel	5 ft 11 in (1.8 m)	160 lb (73 kg)	So	Paul VI Catholic High School	Fairfax, VA
F	2	Tray Jackson	6 ft 10 in (2.08 m)	210 lb (95 kg)	GS	Seton Hall	Detroit, MI
G	3	Jaelin Llewellyn	6 ft 2 in (1.88 m)	190 lb (86 kg)	GS	Princeton	Mono, ON
G	4	Nimari Burnett	6 ft 4 in (1.93 m)	195 lb (88 kg)	GS	Alabama	Chicago, IL
F	5	Terrance Williams II	6 ft 7 in (2.01 m)	225 lb (102 kg)	Sr	Gonzaga College	Clinton, MD
F	13	Olivier Nkamhoua (C)	6 ft 8 in (2.03 m)	236 lb (107 kg)	GS	Tennessee	Helsinki, Finland
G	14	Ian Burns (W)	6 ft 6 in (1.98 m)	205 lb (93 kg)	Jr	New Trier High School	Winnetka, IL
F	24	Youssef Khayat	6 ft 9 in (2.06 m)	195 lb (88 kg)	So	Limoges CSP	Beirut, Lebanon
G	25	Jace Howard (C)	6 ft 7 in (2.01 m)	225 lb (102 kg)	Sr	NSU University School	Miami, FL
F	31	Harrison Hochberg (W)	6 ft 7 in (2.01 m)	225 lb (102 kg)	Fr	Cushing Academy	New York, NY
C	32	Tarris Reed	6 ft 10 in (2.08 m)	260 lb (118 kg)	So	Link Academy	Branson, MO
F	34	Jackson Selvala (W)	6 ft 7 in (2.01 m)	230 lb (104 kg)	GS	Deerfield Academy	New Canaan, CT
G	40	George Washington III	6 ft 2 in (1.88 m)	170 lb (77 kg)	Fr	Chaminade Julienne High School	Dayton, OH
F	42	Will Tschetter	6 ft 8 in (2.03 m)	240 lb (109 kg)	RS So	Stewartville	Stewartville, MN
G	45	Cooper Smith (W)	6 ft 1 in (1.85 m)	175 lb (79 kg)	Jr	Kalamazoo College	Kalamazoo, MI

Head coach

Juwan Howard (Michigan)

Assistant coach(es)

- Saddi Washington (Western Michigan)
- Phil Martelli (Widener)
- Howard Eisley (Boston College)

Legend

- (C) Team captain
- (S) Suspended
- (I) Ineligible
- (W) Walk-on
- Injured
- Current redshirt

Roster

== Regular season ==
=== November ===
Michigan began the season on November 7 with a 99–74 victory over UNC Asheville. Michigan was led by Olivier Nkamhoua with a game-high 25 points and seven rebounds, while Dug McDaniel added a career-high 22 points, Terrance Williams II added 15 points and Nimari Burnett added 13 points. Michigan's defense caused 13 turnovers and scored 18 points off of them. On November 10, Michigan defeated Youngstown State 92–62. Michigan was led by Will Tschetter with a career-high 20 points, while Nkamhoua added 17 points and 10 rebounds, for a double-double, McDaniel added 16 points and Williams II added 13 points. George Washington III scored his first career points in the first half of the game. Both Nkamhoua (7-for-7) and Tschetter (8-for-8) went perfect from the field. On November 13, Michigan defeated St. John's 89–73 in the Gavitt Tipoff Games. Michigan was led by McDaniel with a career-high 26 points, six rebounds and seven assists, while Burnett added a career-high 21 points, Williams II added 12 points, Tschetter added 10 points, Nkamhoua added nine points, seven rebounds and four assists, and Tarris Reed added five points, a career-high 11 rebounds and three blocks. Burnett scored all of his 21 points in the first half, shooting eight-for-eight from the field and four-for-four from three-point range. On November 17, Michigan lost to Long Beach State 94–86. Michigan was led by Nkamhoua with 22 points and 11 rebounds, for a double-double, while McDaniel added 20 points, Jackson added 17 points, and Williams II added 10 points. Michigan jumped out to an early 23–7 lead and held Long Beach State to a three-minute scoring drought in the first half. The Beach took their first lead of the game early in the second half, in a game that featured 13 lead changes. Michigan led for 26:45, while LBSU led for only 11:16. On November 22, Michigan lost to Memphis 71–67 in the quarterfinals of the Battle 4 Atlantis. Michigan was led by Nkamhoua with a game-high 18 points, while Burnett added 16 points, McDaniel added 13 points, and Reed added eight points and 12 rebounds. Michigan trailed 37–25 at halftime, and pulled within one point of Memphis with just over four minutes remaining in the game, however, a Tigers three-pointer sealed the game. Michigan outrebounded Memphis 50–28, including 19 offensive rebounds, and scored 15 second-chance points. The next day Michigan defeated Stanford 83–78 in the consolation round of the Battle 4 Atlantis. All five of Michigan's starters finished in double-figures. Michigan was led by McDaniel with 20 points and eight assists, while Williams II added 17 points, Nkamhoua added 16 points, Reed added 11 points, and Burnett added 10 points. Stanford opened the game on a 12–2 run in the first six minutes of play, before Michigan used a 9–0 run to trim the deficit to three points with 7:33 left in the first half. Michigan led 45–44 at halftime. After being down seven early in the half, the Wolverines went on a 22–2 run to take the lead over Stanford, 67–54 heading into the media timeout. After Michigan took a double-digit lead, they went on a three-minute scoring drought and did not make a field goal for eight minutes. The next day Michigan lost to Texas Tech 73–57 in the fifth-place game of the Battle 4 Atlantis. Michigan was led by Nkamhoua with 16 points, while McDaniel added 12 points and Williams II added 10 points. For a stretch of over nine minutes early in the first half, the Wolverines shot just one-for-10 from the field, falling behind 24–9.

=== December ===
On December 2, Michigan lost to Oregon 86–83 in overtime. Michigan was led by McDaniel with a career-high 32 points, while Burnett added 13 points and Nkamhoua added 12 points. Jaelin Llewellyn returned to the lineup for the first time since suffering a season-ending ACL tear against Kentucky on December 4, 2022, and posted two points in 10 minutes. With the game tied at 83, Oregon's Jackson Shelstad made a deep three-pointer with 1.4 seconds remaining. McDaniel's last-second half-court heave short missed, and the Ducks won the game. Michigan recorded a season-best 13 three-pointers during the game. On December 5, Michigan lost to Indiana 78–75 in its Big Ten Conference season opener. Michigan was led by Nkamhoua with a game-high 18 points, while Tschetter added 17 points, McDaniel added 13 points and Williams II added 10 points. The game featured 18 ties, with the teams being tied for a total of 9:53. On December 10, Michigan defeated Iowa 90–80. All five of Michigan's starters finished in double-figures. Michigan was led by Reed with a career-high 19 points and six rebounds, while Burnett added 14 points, Williams II added 13 points, Nkamhoua added 12 points and ten rebounds, for his third double-double of the season, McDaniel added 11 points and Tschetter added ten points. Michigan trailed 35–37 early in the second half, before they responded with an 11–0 run to put the Wolverines ahead, a lead they never relinquished. Michigan tied its season-high with six blocks, while Reed led Michigan with three blocks, his fifth multi-block game of the season. This game marked Tray Jackson's 100th collegiate game. On December 16, Michigan defeated Eastern Michigan 83–66. Michigan was led by Nkamhoua with 17 points, and nine rebounds, while Burnett added 14 points, Williams II added 13 points, Reed Jr. added 13 points off the bench and McDaniel added 11 points. With his nine rebounds in the game, Nkamhoua surpassed 500 career rebounds. On December 19, Michigan lost to Florida 106–101 in double overtime in the Jumpman Invitational. Michigan was led by McDaniel with a career-high tying 33 points, while Nkamhoua added 24 points and 11 rebounds, for his fourth double-double of the season, Williams II added 17 points, Reed added 14 points and Burnett added 10 points. Despite not making a field goal throughout the entire first overtime period, Michigan took a three-point lead in the final minute behind eight free throws. Florida drilled a three-pointer with 12 seconds remaining to tie the game at 89. Florida held Michigan scoreless for more than three minutes during the second overtime while going on a 12–0 run to take a 102–93 lead. The Wolverines pulled within four in the final minute but were unable to overcome the deficit. On December 29, Michigan lost to McNeese 87–76 in their final non-conference regular season game of the season. Michigan was led by Williams II with 20 points, while McDaniel and Nkamhoua added 17 points each, and Tschetter added 11 points.

=== January ===
On January 4, Michigan lost to Minnesota 73–71. Michigan was led by Burnett with 17 points, while Nkamhoua added 16 points, and Reed added 14 points, 11 rebounds and a career-high five blocks, for his first career double-double. McDaniel was one point shy of extending his double-digit scoring streak to 14 games, finishing with nine points. McDaniel missed a game-tying layup with one second remaining in the game, as Michigan lost the game. On January 7, Michigan lost to Penn State 79–73. Michigan was led by Williams II with a career-high 24 points, while Nkamhoua added 13 points, McDaniel added 11 points, and Burnett added ten points. On January 11, Michigan lost to Maryland 64–57. Michigan was led by Nkamhoua with 18 points, while Williams II added ten points. With his 18 points in the game, Nkamhoua surpassed 1,000 career points. Williams II became the 75th Wolverine to reach the 100-game milestone. On January 15, Michigan won their rivalry game against Ohio State 73–65. Michigan was led by Nkamhoua with a game-high 20 points, while Williams II added 18 points and McDaniel added 15 points. On January 18, Michigan lost to (No. 14 AP Poll/No. 14 Coaches Poll) Illinois 88–73. Michigan was led by Reed with a career-high 20 points, while Nkamhoua added 16 points and McDaniel added 14 points. Michigan used a 7–0 run to trim the deficit to one point with 14:10 left in the second half. Illinois responded with a 17–2 run and remained in control until the end of the game. On January 23, Michigan lost to (No. 2 AP Poll/No. 2 Coaches Poll) Purdue 99–67. Michigan was led by Llewellyn with 16 points, while Williams II added ten points and eight rebounds, and Washington III added a career-high 10 points. On January 27, Michigan lost to Iowa 88–78. Michigan was led by Williams II with 16 points, while McDaniel, Nkamhoua and Burnett added 13 points each. Iowa built a seven-point lead, but then Michigan went on a 6–0 run over 14 seconds and trailed 67–66. After pulling within one point, Michigan missed nine straight field goals and didn't make a field goal for more than six minutes during this span and Iowa extended its lead to 83–71, with 3:42 remaining. Michigan finished the game making only three of its last 15 field goals, and made just one field goal over the final 10 minutes. On January 30, Michigan lost their rivalry game against Michigan State 81–62. Michigan was led by Llewellyn with a season-high 18 points, while Williams II added 14 points. After a Burnett three-pointer less than a minute into the second half gave Michigan a 38–33 lead, Michigan State went on a 16–1 run to take a 10-point lead over Michigan.

=== February ===
On February 3, Michigan lost to Rutgers 69–59. Michigan was led by Nkamhoua with 14 points, while Reed Jr. added 12 points and a career-high 15 rebounds and McDaniel added ten points. Trailing 57–51 with 7:19 left in the second half, Rutgers went on a 14–0 run that spanned more than four minutes to put the Scarlet Knights ahead 65–57, a lead they never relinquished. Michigan missed nine of its final ten shots and was unable to mount a comeback. On February 7, Michigan upset (No. 11 AP Poll/No. 9 Coaches Poll) Wisconsin 68–72. Michigan was led by McDaniel with 16 points, while Reed Jr. added 12 points, Tschetter added 11 points, Williams II added ten points and Nkamhoua added eight points and a season-high 12 rebounds. Trailing by four points, 48–44, with just under 14 minutes remaining in the second half, Michigan went on an 8–0 run to take a 52–48 lead. On February 10, Michigan lost to Nebraska 79–59. Michigan was led by Burnett with 18 points, while Reed Jr. added nine points and nine rebounds, finishing just shy of a double-double. Michigan finished the first half on an 8–0 run, but trailed 45–25 at halftime. Nebraska opened the second half on a 7–0 run, extending their lead 55–29. The Wolverines responded with a 6–0 run and held Nebraska scoreless for more than three minutes. Michigan then went cold, going 2-for-11 from the field. On February 13, Michigan lost to (No. 14 AP Poll/No. 14 Coaches Poll) Illinois 97–68. Michigan was led by Williams II with 17 points, while Reed Jr. added 13 points, seven rebounds and three blocks and Nkamhoua added 13 points, four rebounds and three assists. Freshman George Washington III played a career-high 18 minutes, posting three rebounds, an assist and a steal. Michigan trailed 31–27 with four minutes left before halftime, before Illinois went on a 16–2 run to end the half. Illinois started the second half with a 6–0 run to extend its lead to 24 points. Then, at the 16:11 mark, Illibois went on another 6–0 run to take a 67–37 lead with just under 15 minutes remaining in the game. The Illini extended their lead to as high as 37 points. With four minutes left to play in the game, Williams II scored 10 straight points for Michigan to cut the deficit to 28 points. On February 17, Michigan lost their rivalry game to Michigan State 73–63. Michigan was led by Reed Jr. with 15 points and 11 rebounds, for his second career double-double, while McDaniel added 13 points, Llewellyn added 12 points, Nkamhoua added 11 points and Burnett added ten points. After Michigan tied the game at 61 with 8:07 left in the game, the Wolverines scored just two points, while Michigan State went on 12–2 run to end the game. Michigan did not make a shot over the final seven minutes, and made only one of its final eight field goals. On February 21, head coach Juwan Howard announced that Nkamhoua would miss the remainder of the season after undergoing surgery on his left wrist. On February 22, Michigan lost to Northwestern 76–62. Michigan was led by Burnett with 15 points, while Reed Jr. and Williams II added 13 points each, and Jackson added ten points. This was Jackson's first start as a Wolverine, replacing the injured Nkamhoua. Jackson scored his 600th career point in the first half. Burnett scored eight straight points during a lead-taking 10–2 Michigan run early in the second half. Northwestern answered immediately with an 8–0 run to take a seven-point lead, and Michigan was unable to overcome the deficit. Jace Howard played a season-high 16 minutes, posting five points and one rebound. On February 25, Michigan lost to (No. 3 AP Poll/No. 3 Coaches Poll) Purdue 84–76. Michigan was led by McDaniel with a team-high 19 points and six assists, while Burnett added 12 points, Williams II added 11 points, and Tschetter and Jackson added ten points each. Tschetter made his second start of the season and first since December 16, 2023, against Eastern Michigan. Purdue went on an 11–2 run to take a 45–34 lead with 1:21 left in the first half. Michigan only came within seven points of the Boilermakers for the remainder of the game. On February 29, Michigan lost to Rutgers 82–52. Michigan was led by McDaniel with 13 points and four assists, while Reed Jr. added 12 points and eight rebounds. Rutgers made its first seven shots of the game to take a 16–4 lead with 15:24 to play in the first half. Rutgers capitalized on six Michigan turnovers to extended their lead to 30–14 with 9:13 remaining in the half. Rutgers went on an 11–0 run with 5:28 left to take a 25-point lead. Ruggers missed its next seven shots, while Michigan used a 10–0 run to cut the deficit to 15 points at halftime, 41–26. Rutgers opened the second-half with a 9–0 run to extend their lead to 50–28. Michigan went 2-of-11 from the field at the 10-minute mark, trailing 61–36. Michigan made only one of its last six shots to end the game. With the loss, Michigan is guaranteed to finish in last place in the Big Ten Conference for the first time since the 1966–67 season.

=== March ===
On March 3, Michigan lost their rivalry game against Ohio State 84–61. Michigan was led by McDaniel with 19 points, while Williams II added 13 points. With eight points in the game, Burnett surpassed 500 career points. Harrison Hochberg scored his first career point after splitting a pair of free throws. Cooper Smith scored a career-high five points in the final minutes of the game. With 8:22 remaining, Ohio State went on a 16–2 run which put the Buckeyes up 74–51. On March 10, Michigan lost to Nebraska 85–70. Michigan was led by McDaniel with 17 points, while Williams II added 14 points. Michigan led 16–14 at the media timeout at 14:35, but Nebraska went on an 8–0 run to give itself a six-point lead and maintained it for the remainder of the game. Senior Jackson Selvala scored in a game for the second time in his career, converting on two free throws. With three rebounds in the game, Burnett surpassed 200 career rebounds.

== Postseason ==
=== Big Ten tournament ===
On March 13, Michigan opened its 2024 Big Ten men's basketball tournament play with a 66–57 loss to Penn State in the first round. Michigan was led by Williams II with 15 points, while Reed Jr. added 12 points and eight rebounds and Burnett added 11 points. Michigan tied the game up at 20 points each at the 4:27 mark, but Penn State went on a 10–0 run to take a 30-20 lead with two minutes remaining in the first half. Michigan finished the half shooting 1-for-8 and trailed Penn State, 33–22 at halftime. Michigan opened the second half connecting on six straight field goals to cut the lead to five, but Penn State responded with seven consecutive points to retake a double-digit lead, 47–35, with 14:40 to go. Despite holding Penn State without a field goal for nearly six minutes, Michigan made two of its final 13 shots and was unable to make a comeback. With the loss, Michigan finished the season with an 8–24 record, the most losses in program history, the fewest wins since the 1981–82 season, and the second-worst win percentage in program history. A day after the loss to Penn State in the Big Ten Tournament, Howard was fired after 5 seasons.

== Schedule and results ==
Date time, TV	Rank^{#}	Opponent^{#}	Result	Record	High points	High rebounds	High assists	Site (attendance) city, state
Exhibition
November 3, 2023*; 7:00 p.m., BTN Plus		Northwood	W 92–45	–	20 – Jackson	13 – Tschetter	6 – Tied	Crisler Center (12,254); Ann Arbor, MI
Regular season
November 7, 2023*; 8:30 p.m., BTN		UNC Asheville	W 99–74	1–0	25 – Nkamhoua	7 – Tied	8 – McDaniel	Crisler Center (10,279); Ann Arbor, MI
November 10, 2023*; 6:30 p.m., BTN		Youngstown State	W 92–62	2–0	20 – Tschetter	10 – Nkamhoua	5 – Burnett	Crisler Center (11,380); Ann Arbor, MI
November 13, 2023*; 6:30 p.m., FS1		at St. John's; Gavitt Tipoff Games	W 89–73	3–0	26 – McDaniel	11 – Reed Jr.	7 – McDaniel	Madison Square Garden (14,188); New York, NY
November 17, 2023*; 7:00 p.m., BTN Plus		Long Beach State	L 86–94	3–1	22 – Nkamhoua	11 – Nkamhoua	6 – McDaniel	Crisler Center (10,866); Ann Arbor, MI
November 22, 2023*; 5:00 p.m., ESPN2		vs. Memphis; Battle 4 Atlantis quarterfinals	L 67–71	3–2	18 – Nkamhoua	12 – Reed Jr.	3 – Tied	Imperial Arena (752); Nassau, Bahamas
November 23, 2023*; 8:45 p.m., ESPN2		vs. Stanford; Battle 4 Atlantis consolation round	W 83–78	4–2	20 – McDaniel	6 – Burnett	8 – McDaniel	Imperial Arena (680); Nassau, Bahamas
November 24, 2023*; 6:00 p.m., ESPNU		vs. Texas Tech; Battle 4 Atlantis fifth-place game	L 57–73	4–3	16 – Nkamhoua	6 – Reed Jr.	3 – McDaniel	Imperial Arena (802); Nassau, Bahamas
December 2, 2023*; 3:30 p.m., FS1		at Oregon	L 83–86 ^{OT}	4–4	32 – McDaniel	5 – Tied	3 – Tied	Matthew Knight Arena (11,241); Eugene, OR
December 5, 2023; 9:00 p.m., Peacock		Indiana	L 75–78	4–5 (0–1)	18 – Nkamhoua	6 – Tschetter	3 – Burnett	Crisler Center (11,396); Ann Arbor, MI
December 10, 2023; 3:30 p.m., BTN		at Iowa	W 90–80	5–5 (1–1)	19 – Reed Jr.	10 – Nkamhoua	7 – McDaniel	Carver–Hawkeye Arena (10,000); Iowa City, IA
December 16, 2023; 2:15 p.m., BTN		Eastern Michigan	W 83–66	6–5	17 – Nkamhoua	9 – Nkamhoua	5 – Nkamhoua	Crisler Center (11,761); Ann Arbor, MI
December 19, 2023*; 7:00 p.m., ESPN		vs. Florida; Jumpman Invitational	L 101–106 ^{2OT}	6–6	33 – McDaniel	11 – Nkamhoua	5 – McDainel	Spectrum Center (–); Charlotte, NC
December 29, 2023*; 7:00 p.m., BTN Plus		McNeese	L 76–87	6–7	20 – Williams II	8 – McDaniel	5 – McDaniel	Crisler Center (12,588); Ann Arbor, MI
January 4, 2024; 9:00 p.m., Peacock		Minnesota	L 71–73	6–8 (1–2)	17 – Burnett	11 – Reed Jr.	6 – McDaniel	Crisler Center (10,493); Ann Arbor, MI
January 7, 2024; 12:00 p.m., BTN		vs. Penn State	L 73–79	6–9 (1–3)	24 – Williams II	9 – Nkamhoua	6 – Burnett	The Palestra (6,200); Philadelphia, PA
January 11, 2024; 7:00 p.m., FS1		at Maryland	L 57–64	6–10 (1–4)	18 – Nkamhoua	7 – Nkamhoua	3 – Tied	Xfinity Center (12,007); College Park, MD
January 15, 2024; 12:00 p.m., FOX		Ohio State; Rivalry	W 73–65	7–10 (2–4)	20 – Nkamhoua	10 – Burnett	4 – Tied	Crisler Center (12,202); Ann Arbor, MI
January 18, 2024; 8:30 p.m., FS1		No. 14 Illinois	L 73–88	7–11 (2–5)	20 – Reed Jr.	5 – Reed Jr.	6 – McDaniel	Crisler Center (10,919); Ann Arbor, MI
January 23, 2024; 9:00 p.m., Peacock		at No. 2 Purdue	L 67–99	7–12 (2–6)	16 – Llewellyn	10 – Reed Jr.	4 – Burnett	Mackey Arena (14,876); West Lafayette, IN
January 27, 2024; 5:00 p.m., FS1		Iowa	L 78–88	7–13 (2–7)	16 – Williams II	7 – Reed Jr.	5 – Tied	Crisler Center (11,752); Ann Arbor, MI
January 30, 2024; 9:00 p.m., Peacock		at Michigan State; Rivalry	L 62–81	7–14 (2–8)	18 – Llewellyn	9 – Reed Jr.	3 – Nkamhoua	Breslin Center (14,797); East Lansing, MI
February 3, 2024; 4:00 p.m., BTN		Rutgers	L 59–69	7–15 (2–9)	14 – Nkamhoua	15 – Reed Jr.	3 – McDaniel	Crisler Center (11,683); Ann Arbor, MI
February 7, 2024; 7:00 p.m., BTN		No. 11 Wisconsin	W 72–68	8–15 (3–9)	16 – McDaniel	12 – Nkamhoua	2 – Tied	Crisler Center (10,698); Ann Arbor, MI
February 10, 2024; 5:30 p.m., BTN		at Nebraska	L 59–79	8–16 (3–10)	18 – Burnett	10 – Nkamhoua	3 – Tied	Pinnacle Bank Arena (15,828); Lincoln, NE
February 13, 2024; 6:00 p.m., Peacock		at No. 14 Illinois	L 68–97	8–17 (3–11)	17 – Williams II	7 – Reed Jr.	3 – Nkamhoua	State Farm Center (15,544); Champaign, IL
February 17, 2024; 8:00 p.m., FOX		Michigan State; Rivalry	L 63–73	8–18 (3–12)	15 – Reed Jr.	11 – Reed Jr.	4 – Nkamhoua	Crisler Center (12,707); Ann Arbor, MI
February 22, 2024; 8:00 p.m., FS1		at Northwestern	L 62–76	8–19 (3–13)	15 – Burnett	7 – Williams II	4 – Llewellyn	Welsh–Ryan Arena (6,400); Evanston, IL
February 25, 2024; 2:00 p.m., CBS		No. 3 Purdue	L 76–84	8–20 (3–14)	19 – McDaniel	7 – Reed Jr.	6 – McDaniel	Crisler Center (12,707); Ann Arbor, MI
February 29, 2024; 8:30 p.m., FS1		at Rutgers	L 52–82	8–21 (3–15)	13 – McDaniel	8 – Reed Jr.	4 – McDaniel	Jersey Mike's Arena (8,000); Piscataway, NJ
March 3, 2024; 4:00 p.m., CBS		at Ohio State; Rivalry	L 61–84	8–22 (3–16)	19 – McDaniel	9 – Reed Jr.	3 – McDaniel	Value City Arena (16,606); Columbus, OH
March 10, 2024; 12:00 p.m., BTN		Nebraska	L 70–85	8–23 (3–17)	17 – McDaniel	6 – Reed Jr.	5 – McDaniel	Crisler Center (11,006); Ann Arbor, MI
Big Ten Tournament
March 13, 2024; 9:00 p.m., Peacock	(14)	vs. (11) Penn State; First round	L 57–66	8–24	15 – Williams II	8 – Reed Jr.	6 – McDaniel	Target Center (12,379); Minneapolis, MN
*Non-conference game. ^{#}Rankings from AP Poll. (#) Tournament seedings in parentheses. All times are in Eastern Time.

== Rankings ==
Ranking movements Legend: ██ Increase in ranking ██ Decrease in ranking — = Not ranked RV = Received votes
	Week																				
Poll	Pre	1	2	3	4	5	6	7	8	9	10	11	12	13	14	15	16	17	18	19	Final
AP	—	RV	RV	—	—	—	—	—	—	—	—	—	—	—	—	—	—	—	—		
Coaches'	—	RV	—	—	—	—	—	—	—	—	—	—	—	—	—	—	—	—	—		

== Team players drafted into the NBA ==
After spending his final two years of eligibility with the UConn Huskies, Tarris Reed was drafted 26th overall in the first round of the 2026 NBA draft by the Denver Nuggets.

Year	Round	Pick	Overall	Player	NBA club
2026	1	26	26	Tarris Reed	Denver Nuggets
