= Jumpman Invitational =

American basketball event

Jumpman Invitiational
- Sport: College basketball
- First season: 2022
- No. of teams: 4

The Jumpman Invitational presented by Novant Health is a college basketball event featuring the men's and women's basketball teams that began in 2022 and is played at Spectrum Center in Charlotte, North Carolina. The event is owned and operated by the Charlotte Sports Foundation and ESPN Events.

== History ==
Four teams are participating—Florida, Michigan, North Carolina and Oklahoma. Each team plays one game each year, as a double-header.

== Head-to-head records ==
=== Men's ===
	Florida	Oklahoma	Michigan	North Carolina
vs. Florida	–	1–0	0–1	0–1
vs. Oklahoma	0–1	–	0–1	1–0
vs. Michigan	1–0	1–0	–	1–0
vs. North Carolina	1–0	0–1	0–1	–
Total	2–1	2–1	0–3	2–1
Percentage	.667	.667	.000	.667

=== Women's ===
	Florida	Oklahoma	Michigan	North Carolina
vs. Florida	–	1–0	0–1	1–0
vs. Oklahoma	0–1	–	0–1	1–0
vs. Michigan	1–0	1–0	–	0–1
vs. North Carolina	0–1	0–1	1–0	–
Total	1–2	2–1	1–2	2–1
Percentage	.333	.667	.333	.667

== Game results ==
=== Men's ===
==== 2024 ====
Date	Location	Score	Winning team	Losing team	Attendance	Ref.
December 17, 2024	Spectrum Center • Charlotte, NC	90–84	No. 7 Florida	North Carolina	16,058	
December 18, 2024	Spectrum Center • Charlotte, NC	87–86	No. 14 Oklahoma	No. 24 Michigan	5,859	

==== 2023 ====
Date	Location	Score	Winning team	Losing team	Attendance	Ref.
December 19, 2023	Spectrum Center • Charlotte, NC	106–101 ^{2OT}	Florida	Michigan	7,027	
December 20, 2023	Spectrum Center • Charlotte, NC	81–69	No. 11 North Carolina	No. 7 Oklahoma	16,344	

==== 2022 ====
Date	Location	Score	Winning team	Losing team	Attendance	Ref.
December 20, 2022	Spectrum Center • Charlotte, NC	62–53	Oklahoma	Florida	8,745	
December 21, 2022	Spectrum Center • Charlotte, NC	80–76	North Carolina	Michigan	19,236	

=== Women's ===
==== 2024 ====
Date	Location	Score	Winning team	Losing team	Attendance	Ref.
December 17, 2024	Spectrum Center • Charlotte, NC	72–62	No. 10 Oklahoma	No. 20 Michigan	16,058	
December 18, 2024	Spectrum Center • Charlotte, NC	77–57	No. 19 North Carolina	Florida		

==== 2023 ====
Date	Location	Score	Winning team	Losing team	Attendance	Ref.
December 19, 2023	Spectrum Center • Charlotte, NC	61–52	No. 24 North Carolina	Oklahoma	7,027	
December 20, 2023	Spectrum Center • Charlotte, NC	82–65	Florida	Michigan	16,344	

==== 2022 ====
Date	Location	Score	Winning team	Losing team	Attendance	Ref.
December 20, 2022	Spectrum Center • Charlotte, NC	76–68	No. 19 Michigan	No. 6 North Carolina	8,745	
December 21, 2022	Spectrum Center • Charlotte, NC	95–79	No. 23 Oklahoma	Florida	19,236	
