= 2019 FIBA 3x3 U18 World Cup – Men's tournament =

Tournament details
- Host country: Mongolia
- City: Ulaanbaatar
- Dates: 3–7 June
- Teams: 20

Final positions
- Champions: United States (1st title)
- Runners-up: Turkey
- Third place: Argentina
- Fourth place: Russia

Tournament statistics
- MVP: (United States) Dawson Garcia

The 2019 FIBA 3x3 U18 World Cup – Men's tournament is the seventh edition of this championship. The event was held in Ulaanbaatar, Mongolia. It was contested by 20 teams.

United States won their first title with a win against Turkey in the final.

== Host selection ==
Mongolia's capital, Ulaanbaatar, was given the hosting rights on 31 October 2018. This marks the first time that Mongolia is hosting a world championship in a team sport.

== Teams ==
FIBA announced the qualified teams on 20 December 2018.

Africa

- None

Americas

- Argentina
- Brazil
- Dominican Republic
- United States

Asia and Oceania

- China
- Jordan
- Kazakhstan
- Kyrgyzstan
- Mongolia (hosts)
- Turkmenistan

Europe

- Belarus
- Estonia
- (Georgia (country)) Georgia
- Italy
- Latvia
- Romania
- Russia
- Slovenia
- Turkey
- Ukraine

== Seeding ==
The pools were announced on 6 March 2019. The seeding and groups were as follows:

Pool A	Pool B	Pool C	Pool D
China (1); Slovenia (8); Italy (9); Jordan (16); Turkey (17)	Russia (2); Ukraine (7); Turkmenistan (10); Kazakhstan (15); Dominican Republic (18)	Latvia (3); United States (6); Belarus (11); Mongolia (14) (H) (Georgia (country)) Georgia (19)	Romania (4); Estonia (5); Brazil (12); Kyrgyzstan (13); Argentina (20)

== Preliminary round ==
=== Pool A ===
Pos	Team	Pld	W	L	PF	PA	PD	Qualification	(Turkey)	(Italy)	(Slovenia)	(China)	(Jordan)
1	Turkey	4	4	0	65	43	+22	Quarterfinals		16–10		21–15	
2	Italy	4	3	1	70	52	+18	Quarterfinals				22–17	21–3
3	Slovenia	4	2	2	65	52	+13		10–12	16–17			
4	China	4	1	3	62	80	−18				12–21		18–16
5	Jordan	4	0	4	38	73	−35		8–16		11–18		

Source: FIBA
Rules for classification: 1) Wins; 2) Head-to-head record; 3) Points scored.

=== Pool B ===
Pos	Team	Pld	W	L	PF	PA	PD	Qualification	(Russia)	(Ukraine)	(Dominican Republic)	(Turkmenistan)	(Kazakhstan)
1	Russia	4	4	0	79	50	+29	Quarterfinals		21–16			22–5
2	Ukraine	4	3	1	82	49	+33	Quarterfinals			22–12	22–6	
3	Dominican Republic	4	1	3	62	70	−8		14–17			18–19	
4	Turkmenistan	4	1	3	58	79	−21		15–19				18–20 OT
5	Kazakhstan	4	1	3	47	80	−33			10–22	12–18		

Source: FIBA
Rules for classification: 1) Wins; 2) Head-to-head record; 3) Points scored.

=== Pool C ===
Pos	Team	Pld	W	L	PF	PA	PD	Qualification	(United States)	(Mongolia)	(Latvia)	(Georgia (country))	(Belarus)
1	United States	4	4	0	84	46	+38	Quarterfinals				21–9	21–14
2	Mongolia (H)	4	3	1	69	68	+1	Quarterfinals	10–21			18–16	
3	Latvia	4	2	2	69	78	−9		13–21	16–20			
4	(Georgia (country)) Georgia	4	1	3	65	76	−11				19–21		21–16
5	Belarus	4	0	4	63	82	−19			15–21	18–19		

Source: FIBA
Rules for classification: 1) Wins; 2) Head-to-head record; 3) Points scored.
(H) Hosts

=== Pool D ===
Pos	Team	Pld	W	L	PF	PA	PD	Qualification	(Argentina)	(Romania)	(Brazil)	(Estonia)	(Kyrgyzstan)
1	Argentina	4	4	0	71	48	+23	Quarterfinals		21–17	14–6		
2	Romania	4	3	1	75	62	+13	Quarterfinals				19–17 OT	21–9
3	Brazil	4	2	2	64	60	+4			15–18			22–8
4	Estonia	4	1	3	75	76	−1		17–20		20–21		
5	Kyrgyzstan	4	0	4	41	80	−39		8–16			16–21	

Source: FIBA
Rules for classification: 1) Wins; 2) Head-to-head record; 3) Points scored.

== Knockout stage ==
All times are local.

Quarter-finals
7 June – 13:00
Turkey	21
Mongolia	18
7 June – 13:25
Argentina	21
Ukraine	20
7 June – 15:10
Russia	20
Romania	9
7 June – 15:35
United States	19
Italy	12

Semi-finals
7 June – 17:05
Turkey	13
Argentina	11
7 June – 17:30
Russia	17
United States	18 OT

Final
7 June – 20:40
Turkey	12
United States	16
Bronze medal
7 June – 18:55
Argentina	21
Russia	18

== Final standings ==
=== Tiebreakers ===
- 1) Wins
- 2) Points scored
- 3) Seeding

Pos	Team	Pld	W	L	PF	PA	PD
1	United States	7	7	0	137	87	+50
2	Turkey	7	6	1	111	88	+23
3	Argentina	7	6	1	124	99	+25
4	Russia	7	5	2	134	95	+39
5	Ukraine	5	3	2	102	70	+32
6	Mongolia	5	3	2	87	89	–2
7	Romania	5	3	2	84	82	+2
8	Italy	5	3	2	82	71	+11
9	Latvia	4	2	2	69	78	–9
10	Slovenia	4	2	2	65	52	+13
11	Brazil	4	2	2	64	60	+4
12	Estonia	4	1	3	75	76	–1
13	(Georgia (country)) Georgia	4	1	3	65	76	–11
14	China	4	1	3	62	80	–18
15	Dominican Republic	4	1	3	62	70	–8
16	Turkmenistan	4	1	3	58	79	–21
17	Kazakhstan	4	1	3	47	80	–33
18	Belarus	4	0	4	63	82	–19
19	Kyrgyzstan	4	0	4	41	80	–39
20	Jordan	4	0	4	38	73	–35

== Awards ==
These players were given the awards after the competition:

=== Most valuable player ===
- (United States) Dawson Garcia

=== Top scorer ===
- (United States) Dawson Garcia (52 points)

=== Team of the tournament ===
- (United States) Dawson Garcia
- (Turkey) Cagatay Özkan
- (Argentina) Mateo Diaz

== See also ==
- 2019 FIBA 3x3 World Cup – Men's tournament
- 2019 FIBA 3x3 World Cup – Women's tournament
- 2019 FIBA 3x3 U18 World Cup – Women's tournament
- 2019 FIBA 3x3 Africa Cup
- 2019 FIBA 3x3 U18 Africa Cup
- 2019 FIBA 3x3 Asia Cup
- 2019 FIBA 3x3 Europe Cup
- 2019 FIBA 3x3 U18 Europe Cup – Men's tournament
