= 2024 FIBA 3x3 U18 World Cup – Men's tournament =

Basketball competition in Hungary

Tournament details
- Host country: Hungary
- City: Debrecen Hajdú–Bihar County
- Dates: 26–30 August
- Teams: 17

Final positions
- Champions: United States (3rd title)
- Runners-up: Spain
- Third place: France
- Fourth place: Ukraine

Tournament statistics
- MVP: (United States) Nikolas Khamenia

The 2024 FIBA 3x3 U18 World Cup – Men's tournament was the eleventh edition of this competition. For the fourth time, the event was held in Debrecen, in Hajdú–Bihar County, Hungary. It was contested by 17 teams.

The United States won their third title after defeating Spain 21–13 in the final.

== Host selection ==
For the fourth time in a row, the Hungarian city Debrecen, in Hajdú–Bihar County, was given the hosting rights.

== Teams ==
Africa

- Egypt
- Morocco
- Benin (withdrew)
- Uganda (withdrew)

Americas

- Brazil
- United States

Asia and Oceania

- Thailand
- Qatar
- Sri Lanka (withdrew)
- Uzbekistan
- Kyrgyzstan

Europe

- Germany
- Ukraine
- Latvia
- Estonia
- France
- Slovenia
- Croatia
- Spain
- Hungary (hosts)

== Seeding ==
The seeding and groups were as follows:

Pool A	Pool B	Pool C	Pool D
(United States) USA (1); Egypt (8); Brazil (9); Spain (16); Morocco (17)	Thailand (2); Latvia (7); Estonia (10); Croatia (15); Benin (18) (withdrew)	Germany (3); Uzbekistan (6); Qatar (11); Hungary (19) (H)	Ukraine (4); Kyrgyzstan (5); Slovenia (12); France (13)

== Venue ==

Hajdú–Bihar County

== Preliminary round ==
=== Pool A ===
Pos	Team	Pld	W	L	PF	PA	PD	Qualification	(United States)	(Spain)	(Brazil)	(Egypt)	(Morocco)
1	United States	4	4	0	85	48	+37	Quarterfinals		21–18		22–8	
2	Spain	4	3	1	78	66	+12	Quarterfinals				21–14	21–14
3	Brazil	4	2	2	74	59	+15		14–21	17–18			
4	Egypt	4	1	3	56	84	−28				14–22		20–19
5	Morocco	4	0	4	47	83	−36		8–21		6–21		

Source: FIBA
Rules for classification: 1) Wins; 2) Head-to-head record; 3) Points scored.

=== Pool B ===
Pos	Team	Pld	W	L	PF	PA	PD	Qualification	(Latvia)	(Croatia)	(Thailand)	(Estonia)	(Benin)
1	Latvia	3	3	0	53	37	+16	Quarterfinals		19–15		13–12	Canc.
2	Croatia	3	2	1	57	38	+19	Quarterfinals				21–13	Canc.
3	Thailand	3	1	2	35	59	−24		10–21	6–21			Canc.
4	Estonia	3	0	3	42	53	−11				17–19		Canc.
5	Benin	0	0	0	0	0	0	Withdrew	Canc.	Canc.	Canc.	Canc.	

Source: FIBA
Rules for classification: 1) Wins; 2) Head-to-head record; 3) Points scored.

=== Pool C ===
Pos	Team	Pld	W	L	PF	PA	PD	Qualification	(Germany)	(Hungary)	(Uzbekistan)	(Qatar)
1	Germany	3	3	0	59	26	+33	Quarterfinals		17–11	21–9	
2	Hungary (H)	3	2	1	54	40	+14	Quarterfinals				22–4
3	Uzbekistan	3	1	2	49	54	−5			9–21		21–12
4	Qatar	3	0	3	22	64	−42		6–21			

Source: FIBA
Rules for classification: 1) Wins; 2) Head-to-head record; 3) Points scored.
(H) Hosts

=== Pool D ===
Pos	Team	Pld	W	L	PF	PA	PD	Qualification	(France)	(Ukraine)	(Slovenia)	(Kyrgyzstan)
1	France	3	2	1	62	38	+24	Quarterfinals		20–21		
2	Ukraine	3	2	1	61	47	+14	Quarterfinals			19–21	21–6
3	Slovenia	3	2	1	48	53	−5		6–21			
4	Kyrgyzstan	3	0	3	30	63	−33		11–21		13–21	

Source: FIBA
Rules for classification: 1) Wins; 2) Head-to-head record; 3) Points scored.

== Knockout stage ==
All times are local.

Quarter-finals
30 August 2024 – 15:30
United States	21
Hungary	15
30 August 2024 – 15:55
France	21
Croatia	15
30 August 2024 – 17:20
Latvia	12
Ukraine	21
30 August 2024 – 17:45
Germany	14
Spain	21

Semi-finals
30 August 2024 – 19:10
United States	21
France	17
30 August 2024 – 19:35
Ukraine	19
Spain	21

Final
30 August 2024 – 21:35
United States	21
Spain	13
Bronze medal
30 August 2024 – 20:35
France	21
Ukraine	12

== Final standings ==
=== Tiebreakers ===
- 1) Wins
- 2) Points scored
- 3) Seeding

Pos	Team	Pld	W	L	PF	PA	PD
1	United States	4	4	0	85	48	+37
2	Spain	4	3	1	78	66	+12
3	France	3	2	1	62	38	+24
4	Ukraine	3	1	2	61	47	+14
5	Germany	3	3	0	59	26	+33
6	Latvia	3	3	0	53	37	+16
7	Croatia	3	2	1	57	38	+19
8	Hungary	3	2	1	54	40	+14
9	Slovenia	3	2	1	48	53	-5
10	Brazil	4	2	2	74	59	+15
11	Uzbekistan	3	1	2	49	54	-5
12	Thailand	3	1	2	35	59	-24
13	Egypt	4	1	3	56	84	-28
14	Estonia	3	0	3	42	53	-11
15	Morocco	4	0	4	47	83	-36
16	Kyrgyzstan	3	0	3	30	63	-33
17	Qatar	3	0	3	22	64	-42

== Awards ==
Team of the tournament
(United States) Nikolas Khamenia	(Spain) Alexandre Carrasco	(France) Zakaria Mechergui
Most valuable player
(United States) Nikolas Khamenia
Top scorer
(United States) Nikolas Khamenia (61 points)
