= Prior Lake High School =

Location
- 7575 150th St W Savage, Minnesota 55378; United States; 44.7320°N 93.3747°W

Information
- Type: Public
- Motto: Home of the Lakers
- Established: 1968
- CEEB code: 242-035
- Principal: John Bezek
- Teaching staff: 135.41 (on an FTE basis)
- Grades: 9–12
- Enrollment: 2,854 (2023–2024)
- Student to teacher ratio: 21.44
- Campus type: Suburban
- Athletics conference: South Suburban Conference
- Mascot: Laker
- Team name: Lakers
- Newspaper: The Wave
- Yearbook: Voyageur
- Colors: Navy Blue and Gold
- Website: plhs.plsas.org

Prior Lake High School (PLHS) is located in Savage, Minnesota, United States and enrolls students in grades 9–12. The school is part of the South Suburban Conference. It has approximately 2,900 students currently enrolled. The students and teams at Prior Lake High School are known as "Lakers". A book, "Another Planet: A Year in the Life of a Suburban High School", was written by author Elinor Burkett and paints a controversial portrait of life in the school and around the city of Prior Lake. In 2003 when the new high school building opened in Savage, the decision was made to keep the name "Prior Lake" High School because of the rich history of the school. The principal's name is John Bezek. The school currently utilizes a 6-period system.

== Growth ==
In 2009, the school faced issues with overcrowding, with about 200 extra students over capacity enrolled in the high school. A Growth Task Force was created to find solutions to the issue, which included closing open enrollment. During the 2013–14 school year, PLHS enrolled 405 students over capacity. To address short-term spatial issues, a 4th wing of PLHS was opened for the 2014–15 school year to combat overcrowding. Just one year later during the 2015–16 school year, however, PLHS saw enrollment numbers above 100% capacity again. In 2017, Prior Lake-Savage Area Schools passed a referendum that allocated $46.8 million for construction on Prior Lake High School to combat growing enrollment. In the 2018-2019 school year the school was continuing to operate over 100% capacity and some of the new classrooms were finished halfway through the 2019–20 school year.

== Construction ==
Prior Lake High School was originally designed by Wold Architects and Engineers in 2003. Wold continued to be involved in the later additions to the school, with the assistance of Nexus Solutions. The 2018 referendum renovations included the expansion of Towers A-C, a cafeteria expansion, a new north entry, new weight and locker rooms, updated toilets and showers, a café, a new classroom wing with flexible learning spaces, and an expanded auto shop. The construction was carried out by H+U Construction, and was completed in July 2020.

== Awards and honors ==
Prior Lake High School was ranking 197 out of 500 in Newsweek's best high schools in the country in 2016.

== Notable alumni ==
- Jide Abasiri, college football defensive tackle for the USC Trojans
- Teal Bunbury, American soccer player
- Kylie Bunbury
- Drew Christensen
- Dawson Garcia
- Greg Johnson, college football offensive lineman for the Minnesota Golden Gophers
- Becca Kufrin
- Agasthi Jayatilaka
- Eric Pratt
- A. J. Sass
- Tiffany Stratton
