= 2021 FIBA 3x3 U18 World Cup – Men's tournament =

Basketball competition in Hungary

Tournament details
- Host country: Hungary
- City: Debrecen
- Dates: 24–29 August
- Teams: 18

Final positions
- Champions: United States (2nd title)
- Runners-up: Estonia
- Third place: Belarus
- Fourth place: Egypt

Tournament statistics
- MVP: (United States) Keyonte George

The 2021 FIBA 3x3 U18 World Cup – Men's tournament is the eighth edition of this competition. The event was held in Debrecen, Hungary. It was contested by 18 teams.

United States won their second successive title with a win against Estonia in the final.

== Host selection ==
Hungarian city, Debrecen, was given the hosting rights.

== Teams ==
Africa

- Egypt

Americas

- Brazil
- Dominican Republic
- United States

Asia and Oceania

- Indonesia
- Kazakhstan
- Mongolia

Europe

- Belarus
- Estonia
- France (withdrew)
- Germany
- Hungary (hosts)
- Israel
- Latvia
- Lithuania
- Romania
- Russia
- Slovenia
- Ukraine

== Seeding ==
The seeding and groups were as follows:

| Pool A | Pool B | Pool C | Pool D |
|---|---|---|---|
| Kazakhstan (1); Brazil (8); Indonesia (14); Ukraine (15) | Russia (2); Dominican Republic (7); Lithuania (9); Hungary (13) (H); Mongolia (16) | Egypt (3); Belarus (6); Germany (10); Romania (12); Israel (17) | Estonia (4); Latvia (5); Slovenia (11); United States (18) |

== Preliminary round ==
=== Pool A ===
| Pos | Team | Pld | W | L | PF | PA | PD | Qualification | (Ukraine) | (Kazakhstan) | (Brazil) | (Indonesia) | (France) |
|---|---|---|---|---|---|---|---|---|---|---|---|---|---|
| 1 | Ukraine | 3 | 3 | 0 | 66 | 29 | +37 | Quarterfinals | | | | 22–9 | Canc. |
| 2 | Kazakhstan | 3 | 2 | 1 | 50 | 50 | 0 | Quarterfinals | 12–22 | | 21–13 | | Canc. |
| 3 | Brazil | 3 | 1 | 2 | 37 | 52 | −15 | | 8–22 | | | 16–9 | Canc. |
| 4 | Indonesia | 3 | 0 | 3 | 33 | 55 | −22 | | | 15–17 | | | Canc. |
| 5 | France | 0 | 0 | 0 | 0 | 0 | 0 | Withdrew | Canc. | Canc. | Canc. | Canc. | |

Source: FIBA
Rules for classification: 1) Wins; 2) Head-to-head record; 3) Points scored.

=== Pool B ===
| Pos | Team | Pld | W | L | PF | PA | PD | Qualification | (Dominican Republic) | (Lithuania) | (Russia) | (Hungary) | (Mongolia) |
|---|---|---|---|---|---|---|---|---|---|---|---|---|---|
| 1 | Dominican Republic | 4 | 3 (Note: Dominican Republic 22–20 Lithuania) | 1 | 76 | 65 | +11 | Quarterfinals | | 22–20 OT | | | 18–16 |
| 2 | Lithuania | 4 | 3 | 1 | 82 | 75 | +7 | Quarterfinals | | | 20–19 | 20–15 | |
| 3 | Russia | 4 | 2 | 2 | 72 | 75 | −3 | | 22–21 OT | | | 15–13 | |
| 4 | Hungary (H) | 4 | 1 (Note: Hungary 16–14 Mongolia) | 3 | 51 | 64 | −13 | | 7–15 | | | | 16–14 |
| 5 | Mongolia | 4 | 1 | 3 | 70 | 72 | −2 | | | 19–22 | 21–16 | | |

Source: FIBA
Rules for classification: 1) Wins; 2) Head-to-head record; 3) Points scored.
(H) Hosts

=== Pool C ===
| Pos | Team | Pld | W | L | PF | PA | PD | Qualification | (Egypt) | (Belarus) | (Israel) | (Germany) | (Romania) |
|---|---|---|---|---|---|---|---|---|---|---|---|---|---|
| 1 | Egypt | 4 | 4 | 0 | 71 | 52 | +19 | Quarterfinals | | 20–17 | | | 18–12 |
| 2 | Belarus | 4 | 3 | 1 | 79 | 61 | +18 | Quarterfinals | 20–17 | | 21–20 | | |
| 3 | Israel | 4 | 1 | 3 | 68 | 69 | −1 | | 13–20 | | | 14–17 | |
| 4 | Germany | 4 | 1 (Note: Germany is ranked higher due to their better seeding.) | 3 | 50 | 63 | −13 | | 10–13 | | | | 14–15 |
| 5 | Romania | 4 | 1 | 3 | 50 | 73 | −23 | | | 12–20 | 11–21 | | |

Source: FIBA
Rules for classification: 1) Wins; 2) Head-to-head record; 3) Points scored.

=== Pool D ===
| Pos | Team | Pld | W | L | PF | PA | PD | Qualification | (United States) | (Estonia) | (Slovenia) | (Latvia) |
|---|---|---|---|---|---|---|---|---|---|---|---|---|
| 1 | United States | 3 | 3 | 0 | 64 | 38 | +26 | Quarterfinals | | | 21–13 | |
| 2 | Estonia | 3 | 2 | 1 | 59 | 49 | +10 | Quarterfinals | 17–21 | | | 21–11 |
| 3 | Slovenia | 3 | 1 | 2 | 51 | 61 | −10 | | | 17–21 | | |
| 4 | Latvia | 3 | 0 | 3 | 38 | 64 | −26 | | 8–22 | | 19–21 | |

Source: FIBA
Rules for classification: 1) Wins; 2) Head-to-head record; 3) Points scored.

== Knockout stage ==
All times are local.

Quarter-finals
28 Aug 2021 – 09:40
Ukraine | 14
Belarus | 21
28 Aug 2021 – 11:55
United States | 21
Lithuania | 13
28 Aug 2021 – 12:20
Dominican Republic | 13
Estonia | 21
28 Aug 2021 – 09:15
Egypt | 21
Kazakhstan | 16

Semi-finals
29 Aug 2021 – 12:05
Belarus | 13
United States | 21
29 Aug 2021 – 12:30
Estonia | 16
Egypt | 11

Final
29 Aug 2021 – 20:30
United States | 21
Estonia | 14
Bronze medal
29 Aug 2021 – 14:15
Belarus | 21
Egypt | 9

== Final standings ==
=== Tiebreakers ===
- 1) Wins
- 2) Points scored
- 3) Seeding

| Pos | Team | Pld | W | L | PF | PA | PD |
|---|---|---|---|---|---|---|---|
| 1 | United States | 6 | 7 | 0 | 127 | 78 | +49 |
| 2 | Estonia | 6 | 4 | 2 | 110 | 94 | +16 |
| 3 | Belarus | 7 | 4 | 1 | 134 | 105 | +29 |
| 4 | Egypt | 7 | 5 | 2 | 112 | 105 | +7 |
| 5 | Ukraine | 4 | 3 | 1 | 80 | 50 | +30 |
| 6 | Lithuania | 5 | 3 | 2 | 95 | 96 | –1 |
| 7 | Dominican Republic | 5 | 3 | 2 | 89 | 86 | +3 |
| 8 | Kazakhstan | 4 | 2 | 2 | 66 | 71 | –5 |
| 9 | Russia | 4 | 2 | 2 | 72 | 75 | –3 |
| 10 | Slovenia | 3 | 1 | 2 | 51 | 61 | –10 |
| 11 | Brazil | 3 | 1 | 2 | 37 | 52 | –15 |
| 12 | Mongolia | 4 | 1 | 3 | 70 | 72 | –2 |
| 13 | Israel | 4 | 1 | 3 | 68 | 69 | –1 |
| 14 | Hungary | 4 | 1 | 3 | 51 | 64 | –13 |
| 15 | Germany | 4 | 1 | 3 | 50 | 63 | –13 |
| 16 | Romania | 4 | 1 | 3 | 50 | 73 | –23 |
| 17 | Latvia | 3 | 0 | 3 | 38 | 64 | –26 |
| 18 | Indonesia | 3 | 0 | 3 | 33 | 55 | –22 |

== Awards ==
These players were given the awards after the competition:

=== Most valuable player ===
- (United States) Keyonte George

=== Top scorer ===
- (Belarus) Illia Milasheuski (54 points)

=== Team of the tournament ===
- (United States) Keyonte George
- (Estonia) Markus Heinakroon
- (Belarus) Illia Milasheuski

== See also ==
- 2021 FIBA 3x3 U18 World Cup – Women's tournament
- 2021 FIBA 3x3 AmeriCup
- 2021 FIBA 3x3 Europe Cup
