= United States men's national under-18 3x3 team =

USA basketball teams

United States
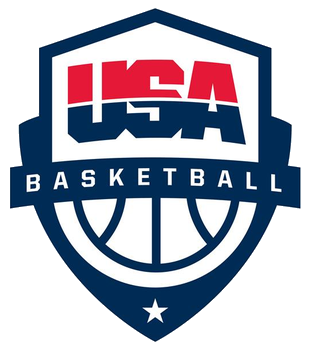
- FIBA zone: FIBA Americas
- National federation: USA Basketball

FIBA 3x3 U18 World Cup
- Appearances: 8
- Medals: Gold: (2019, 2021, 2024); Silver: (2012)

Youth Olympic Games
- Appearances: 2
- Medals: –
Medal record
FIBA 3x3 U18 World Cup
Gold medal – first place	2019 Ulaanbaatar
Gold medal – first place	2021 Debrecen
Gold medal – first place	2024 Debrecen
Silver medal – second place	2012 Alcobendas

The United States men's under-18 3x3 team is an under-18 3x3 basketball team representing the United States and administered by the USA Basketball organization. In 2011, International Basketball Federation (FIBA) held the first World Cup. One is generally held every year, but it was not held in 2014 and 2018 due to 3x3 basketball being an event at the 2014 and 2018 Summer Youth Olympics. It was not held in 2020 due to the COVID-19 pandemic. The United States won its third overall gold medal in 2024.

== Tournament record ==
=== FIBA 3x3 U18 World Cup ===
Year	Result	Position	Pld	W	L
(Italy) 2011	Quarter-finals	8th			
(Spain) 2012	Runners-up	2nd			
(Indonesia) 2013	Preliminary round	9th			
(Hungary) 2015	Quarter-finals	8th			
(Kazakhstan) 2016	Did not qualified				
(China) 2017	Did not qualified				
(Mongolia) 2019	Champions	1st	7	7	0
(Hungary) 2021	Champions	1st	6	6	0
(Hungary) 2022	Preliminary round	11th	4	2	2
(Hungary) 2023	Did not qualified				
(Hungary) 2024	Champions	1st	7	7	0
Total	3 Titles	8/11			

==== World Cup MVPs ====
- Dawson Garcia — 2019
- Keyonte George — 2021
- Nikolas Khamenia — 2024

=== Youth Olympic Games ===
Year	Result	Position	Pld	W	L
(Singapore) 2010	Fourth place	4th	7	5	2
(China) 2014	Did not participated				
(Argentina) 2018	Preliminary round	13th	4	2	2
(Senegal) 2026	To be determined				
Total	0 Title	2/4	11	7	4
