= FIBA 3x3 U17 Africa Cup =

Basketball competition

- Sport: 3x3 basketball
- Founded: 2019
- Country: FIBA Africa members
- Continent: Africa

The FIBA 3x3 U17 Africa Cup (or FIBA 3x3 U18 Africa Cup in 2019) is an under-17/under-18 3x3 basketball competition between FIBA Africa members.

== History ==
The event was held for the first time in 2019 and has been held annually since 2022.

In the championship there are 2 events, men's and women's. Each team has 4 players (3 on court, 1 bench), aged fewer than 17 years. The match is played on a half court and every rule applies as well as a 12-second shot clock and clearance needed on a new possession.

== Results ==
=== Men's tournament ===
Under-18

Year	Host	Final			Third place match		
Year	Host	Champion	Score	Second place	Third place	Score	Fourth place
2019; Details	(Uganda); Kampala	Egypt	14–13	Mali	Uganda	17–12	Nigeria

Under-17

Year	Host	Final			Third place match		
Year	Host	Champion	Score	Second place	Third place	Score	Fourth place
2022; Details	(Egypt); Cairo	Egypt	20–17	(Democratic Republic of the Congo) Congo DR	Morocco	21–15	Algeria
2023; Details	(Egypt); Cairo	Egypt	17–11	Morocco	Algeria	20–13	Uganda

=== Women's tournament ===
Under-18

Year	Host	Final			Third place match		
Year	Host	Champion	Score	Second place	Third place	Score	Fourth place
2019; Details	(Uganda); Kampala	Mali	17–4	Uganda	Nigeria	8–6	(Democratic Republic of the Congo) Congo DR

Under-17

Year	Host	Final			Third place match		
Year	Host	Champion	Score	Second place	Third place	Score	Fourth place
2022; Details	(Egypt); Cairo	Egypt	21–3	(Democratic Republic of the Congo) Congo DR	Morocco	12–10	Zambia
2023; Details	(Egypt); Cairo	Egypt	21–9	Morocco	Uganda	18–5	Algeria

== Editions ==
- 2019 FIBA 3x3 U18 Africa Cup
- 2022 FIBA 3x3 U17 Africa Cup – Men's tournament
- 2022 FIBA 3x3 U17 Africa Cup – Women's tournament
- 2023 FIBA 3x3 U17 Africa Cup – Men's tournament
- 2023 FIBA 3x3 U17 Africa Cup – Women's tournament

== See also ==
- FIBA 3x3 Africa Cup
- FIBA 3x3 U18 World Cup
