= Coca-Cola Music Hall =

Live music venue in San Juan, Puerto Rico

- Interactive map of Coca-Cola Music Hall
- Address: 250 Convention Boulevard; Santurce, San Juan, Puerto Rico
- Location: T-Mobile District; Puerto Rico Convention Center District, Isla Grande
- Coordinates: 18.4551°N 66.0926°W
- Operator: ASM Global
- Seating type: Standing-room only
- Capacity: 4,000
- Type: Music and concert venue
- Events: Music, concerts
- Public transit: B21, C53, ME (AMA)

Construction
- Built: 2020
- Opened: August 14, 2021; 5 years ago
- Cost: $40 Million
- Project manager: PRISA Group

Website
- cocacolamusichall.com

The Coca-Cola Music Hall is a live-music venue located in the neighborhood of Isla Grande in San Juan, Puerto Rico, managed by ASM Global. The Coca-Cola Music Hall is part of the T-Mobile District development at the Puerto Rico Convention District.

== History ==
The Coca-Cola Music Hall was built as part of a development plan in the area surrounding the Puerto Rico Convention Center. Initially called District Live!, it was constructed as an entertainment hub, which included two live music venues, an outdoor plaza with a performing stage, retail and eating spaces and a Caribbean Cinemas movie theater. The area was officially opened as the T-Mobile District.

Construction of the T-Mobile District and the Coca-Cola Music Hall began in 2016 as part of a redevelopment project aimed at complementing the Puerto Rico Convention Center, which opened in 2005. The Coca-Cola Music Hall was built as a live performance venue, equipped with a sound system, a 75-by-30-foot LED screen, and in-house lighting equipment. The project cost $40 million and was completed in 2020, but the venue’s opening was delayed until 2021 due to the COVID-19 pandemic. In 2019, naming rights were sold to The Coca-Cola Company, making it the first venue in Puerto Rico to sell its naming rights.

Puerto Rican singer, Ednita Nazario held the inaugural event at the venue to a sold-out performance.

On March 16, 2022, the Coca-Cola Music Hall hosted the Miss World 2021 pageant, (Note: Miss World 2021 was televised live at 20:00 Atlantic Standard Time (UTC-04:00). The rest of Africa, Asia, Europe and Western Oceania was on March 17, 2022. The UTC time was 00:00.) which was originally scheduled on December 16, 2021 at the José Miguel Agrelot Coliseum. (Note: On December 14, 2021. Miss Indonesia Pricilia Carla Yules was tested positive to COVID-19 as a precaution, her roommate Miss India Manasa Varanasi and five other candidates were classified as suspected cases. The incident prompted Miss World organization to reschedule the pageant to 90 days.)

== See also ==
- José Miguel Agrelot Coliseum
- Luis A. Ferré Performing Arts Center

== Notes ==
Preceded by ExCeL (United Kingdom) London	Miss World venue 2021	Succeeded by Jio World Convention Centre (India) Mumbai
