= Serbia men's national under-18 3x3 team =

National 3x3 basketball team

Serbia
- FIBA zone: FIBA Europe
- National federation: KSS
- Nickname(s): Beli orlovi (White Eagles); Orlovi (The Eagles)

3x3 U18 World Cup
- Appearances: 2
- Medals: Gold (1): 2012

3x3 U18 Europe Cup
- Appearances: 1
- Medals: None

Youth Olympic Games
- Appearances: 1
- Medals: Gold (1): 2010
Home	Away
Medal record
Men's 3x3
Representing Serbia
Youth Olympic Games
Gold medal – first place	2010 Singapore
Under-18 World Championships
Gold medal – first place	2012 Spain

The Serbia men's national under-18 3x3 team (Serbian: Мушка репрезентација Србије у баскету до 18 година / Muška reprezentacija Srbije u basketu do 18 godina) represents Serbia in international under-18 3x3 basketball matches and is controlled by the Basketball Federation of Serbia.

== Competitions ==
=== Youth Olympic Games ===
Year	Position	Pld	W	L	Players
2010 Singapore	Gold medal	7	7	0	Bezbradica, Radonjić, Avramović, Popovski-Turanjanin
(China) 2014 Nanjing	Did not participate				None
(Argentina) 2018 Buenos Aires	Did not participate				None
Total	1/2	7	7	0	

=== FIBA 3x3 Under-18 World Cup ===
Year	Position	Pld	W	L	Players
2011 Italy	6th	12	9	3	
2012 Spain	Gold medal	10	10	0	Andrić, Janković, Zagorac, Anđušić
2013 Indonesia	Did not participate				None
2015 Hungary	Did not participate				None
2016 Kazakhstan	Did not participate				None
2017 China	Did not participate				None
2019 Mongolia	Did not participate				None
2021 Hungary	Did not participate				None
2022 Hungary	Silver medal	7	6	1	Đorđević, Mitrović, Panišić, Šuput
2023 Hungary	11th	4	2	2	Dimitrijevic, Jokić, Pupovac, Šuput
2024 Hungary	Did not participate				None
Total	4/11	33	27	6	

=== FIBA Under-17 Europe Cup ===
Year	Pos.	Pld	W	L	Players	Ref.
2015 Belarus	Did not participate				None	
2016 Hungary	12th	2	0	2	Ćosić, Hadžić, Laković, Novaković	
2017 Hungary	5th	3	2	1	Antić, Bakula, Kovačević, Novaković	
2018 Hungary	Silver medal	5	4	1	Antić, Bijelić, Milović, Stanković	
(Georgia (country)) 2019 Georgia	5th	3	2	1	Gole, Kumović, Simjanovski, Šarenac	
2021 Portugal	7th	3	1	2	Bursac, Mitrović, Panišić, Šuput	
2022 Greece	Did not qualify				None	
2023 Greece	9th	2	1	1	Durutović, Savić, Šuput, Tatić	
Total	6/8	18	10	8		

== See also ==
- Serbia men's national 3x3 team
- Serbia men's national under-18 basketball team
