= 2023 FIBA 3x3 AmeriCup – Men's tournament =

Tournament details
- Host country: Puerto Rico
- City: San Juan
- Dates: 30 November–3 December
- Teams: 19
- Venue: Distrito T-Mobile

Final positions
- Champions: Puerto Rico (1st title)
- Runners-up: Brazil
- Third place: Dominican Republic
- Fourth place: Mexico

Tournament statistics
- MVP: (Puerto Rico) Angel Matias

The 2023 FIBA 3x3 AmeriCup – Men's tournament is the third edition of this continental championship. The event was held in San Juan, Puerto Rico. It was contested by 19 teams.

Puerto Rico won their first title with a win against Brazil with the final score of 18–14.

== Host selection ==
Puerto Rico's capital, San Juan, was given the hosting rights on 20 January 2023.

== Participating teams ==
All National Federations in the Americas region were invited to register a team for the 2023 FIBA 3x3 AmeriCup.

Preliminary round

Pool A

- United States (1)
- Argentina (7)
- Qualifier

Pool B

- Canada (2)
- Qualifier
- Qualifier

Pool C

- Puerto Rico (3)
- Dominican Republic (6)
- Qualifier

Pool D

- Chile (4)
- Brazil (5)
- Qualifier

Qualifying draw

Pool A

- Uruguay (8)
- Barbados (15)
- Colombia (16)

Pool B

- Mexico (9)
- Jamaica (14)
- Guatemala (17)

Pool C

- Suriname (10)
- Haiti (13)
- Aruba (18)

Pool D

- Saint Lucia (11)
- Ecuador (12)
- Cayman Islands (19)

== Qualifying draw ==
The four group winners plus the best runner up qualifies for the next round.

=== Pool A ===
Pos	Team	Pld	W	L	PF	PA	PD	Qualification	(Uruguay)	(Colombia)	(Barbados)
1	Uruguay	2	2	0	42	26	+16	Preliminary round		21–12	21–14
2	Colombia	2	1	1	30	27	+3				
3	Barbados	2	0	2	20	39	−19			6–18	

Source: FIBA
Rules for classification: 1) Wins; 2) Head-to-head record; 3) Points scored.

=== Pool B ===
Pos	Team	Pld	W	L	PF	PA	PD	Qualification	(Mexico)	(Jamaica)	(Guatemala)
1	Mexico	2	2	0	39	22	+17	Preliminary round		22–13	17–9
2	Jamaica	2	1	1	34	35	−1	Preliminary round			
3	Guatemala	2	0	2	22	38	−16			13–21	

Source: FIBA
Rules for classification: 1) Wins; 2) Head-to-head record; 3) Points scored.

=== Pool C ===
Pos	Team	Pld	W	L	PF	PA	PD	Qualification	(Haiti)	(Suriname)	(Aruba)
1	Haiti	2	2	0	41	32	+9	Preliminary round			20–15
2	Suriname	2	1	1	33	32	+1		17–21		16–11
3	Aruba	2	0	2	26	36	−10				

Source: FIBA
Rules for classification: 1) Wins; 2) Head-to-head record; 3) Points scored.

=== Pool D ===
Pos	Team	Pld	W	L	PF	PA	PD	Qualification	(Ecuador)	(Saint Lucia)	(Cayman Islands)
1	Ecuador	2	2	0	29	21	+8	Preliminary round			16–11
2	Saint Lucia	2	1	1	27	29	−2		10–13		17–16
3	Cayman Islands	2	0	2	27	33	−6				

Source: FIBA
Rules for classification: 1) Wins; 2) Head-to-head record; 3) Points scored.

=== Ranking of second-placed teams ===
Jamaica advanced as they scored the most points of the four teams.

Pos	Team	Pld	W	L	PF	PA	PD	Qualification
1	Jamaica	2	1	1	34	35	−1	Preliminary round
2	Suriname	2	1	1	33	32	+1	
3	Colombia	2	1	1	30	27	+3	
4	Saint Lucia	2	1	1	27	29	−2	

Source: FIBA
Rules for classification: 1) Wins; 2) Points scored.

== Preliminary round ==
=== Pool A ===
Pos	Team	Pld	W	L	PF	PA	PD	Qualification	(United States)	(Argentina)	(Jamaica)
1	United States	2	2	0	43	25	+18	quarter-finals		21–12	22–13
2	Argentina	2	1	1	26	34	−8	quarter-finals			14–13
3	Jamaica	2	0	2	26	36	−10				

Source: FIBA
Rules for classification: 1) Wins; 2) Head-to-head record; 3) Points scored.

=== Pool B ===
Pos	Team	Pld	W	L	PF	PA	PD	Qualification	(Uruguay)	(Canada)	(Ecuador)
1	Uruguay	2	2	0	42	36	+6	quarter-finals			21–16
2	Canada	2	1	1	42	35	+7	quarter-finals	20–21		22–14
3	Ecuador	2	0	2	30	43	−13				

Source: FIBA
Rules for classification: 1) Wins; 2) Head-to-head record; 3) Points scored.

=== Pool C ===
Pos	Team	Pld	W	L	PF	PA	PD	Qualification	(Puerto Rico)	(Dominican Republic)	(Haiti)
1	Puerto Rico (H)	2	2	0	37	32	+5	quarter-finals		19–17 OT	18–15
2	Dominican Republic	2	1	1	33	34	−1	quarter-finals			16–15
3	Haiti	2	0	2	30	34	−4				

Source: FIBA
Rules for classification: 1) Wins; 2) Head-to-head record; 3) Points scored.
(H) Hosts

=== Pool D ===
Pos	Team	Pld	W	L	PF	PA	PD	Qualification	(Brazil)	(Mexico)	(Chile)
1	Brazil	2	1	1	32	26	+6	quarter-finals		21–10	
2	Mexico	2	1	1	28	32	−4	quarter-finals			
3	Chile	2	1	1	27	29	−2		16–11	11–18	

Source: FIBA
Rules for classification: 1) Wins; 2) Head-to-head record; 3) Points scored.

== Knockout stage ==
All times are local.

Quarter-finals
3 Dec 2023 – 15:40
United States	16
Dominican Republic	18
3 Dec 2023 – 15:15
Brazil (OT)	16
Canada	15
3 Dec 2023 – 17:05
Uruguay	20
Mexico	22
3 Dec 2023 – 17:30
Puerto Rico	21
Argentina	8

Semi-finals
3 Dec 2023 – 18:55
Dominican Republic	12
Brazil	21
3 Dec 2023 – 19:20
Mexico	13
Puerto Rico	21

Final
3 Dec 2023 – 21:20
Brazil	14
Puerto Rico	18
Bronze medal
3 Dec 2023 – 20:20
Dominican Republic	21
Mexico	15

== Final standings ==
Pos	Team	Pld	W	L	PF	PA	PD
1	Puerto Rico	5	5	0	97	57	+40
2	Brazil	5	3	2	83	71	+12
3	Dominican Republic	5	3	2	84	86	–2
4	Mexico	7	4	3	117	74	+44
5	Uruguay	5	4	1	104	84	+20
6	United States	3	2	1	59	43	+16
7	Canada	3	1	2	57	51	+6
8	Argentina	3	1	2	34	55	–21
9	Chile	2	1	1	27	29	–2
10	Ecuador	4	2	2	59	64	–5
11	Haiti	4	2	2	71	66	+5
12	Jamaica	4	1	3	60	71	–1

Eliminated in the qualifying draw

Pos	Team	Pld	W	L	PF	PA	PD
13	Suriname	2	1	1	33	32	+1
14	Colombia	2	1	1	30	27	+3
15	Saint Lucia	2	1	1	27	29	–2
16	Cayman Islands	2	0	2	27	33	–6
17	Aruba	2	0	2	26	36	–10
18	Guatemala	2	0	2	22	38	–16
19	Barbados	2	0	2	20	39	–19

== Awards ==
These players were given the awards after the competition:

=== Most valuable player ===
- (Puerto Rico) Angel Matias

=== Top scorer ===
- (Puerto Rico) Angel Matias (40 points)

=== Team of the tournament ===
- (Puerto Rico) Angel Matias
- (Brazil) Jonatas Mello
- (Dominican Republic) Brayan Manuel Almonte Martinez

== See also ==
- 2023 FIBA 3x3 World Cup – Men's tournament
- 2023 FIBA 3x3 World Cup – Women's tournament
- 2023 FIBA 3x3 AmeriCup – Women's tournament
- 2023 FIBA 3x3 U18 World Cup – Men's tournament
- 2023 FIBA 3x3 U18 World Cup – Women's tournament
- 2023 FIBA 3x3 Africa Cup – Men's tournament
- 2023 FIBA 3x3 Africa Cup – Women's tournament
- 2023 FIBA 3x3 U17 Africa Cup – Men's tournament
- 2023 FIBA 3x3 U17 Africa Cup – Women's tournament
- 2023 FIBA 3x3 Asia Cup
- 2023 FIBA 3x3 Europe Cup
