= Antiguo Casino de Puerto Rico =

Historic building in San Juan, Puerto Rico

- U.S. National Register of Historic Places
- U.S. National Historic Landmark District – Contributing property
- Puerto Rico Historic Sites and Zones
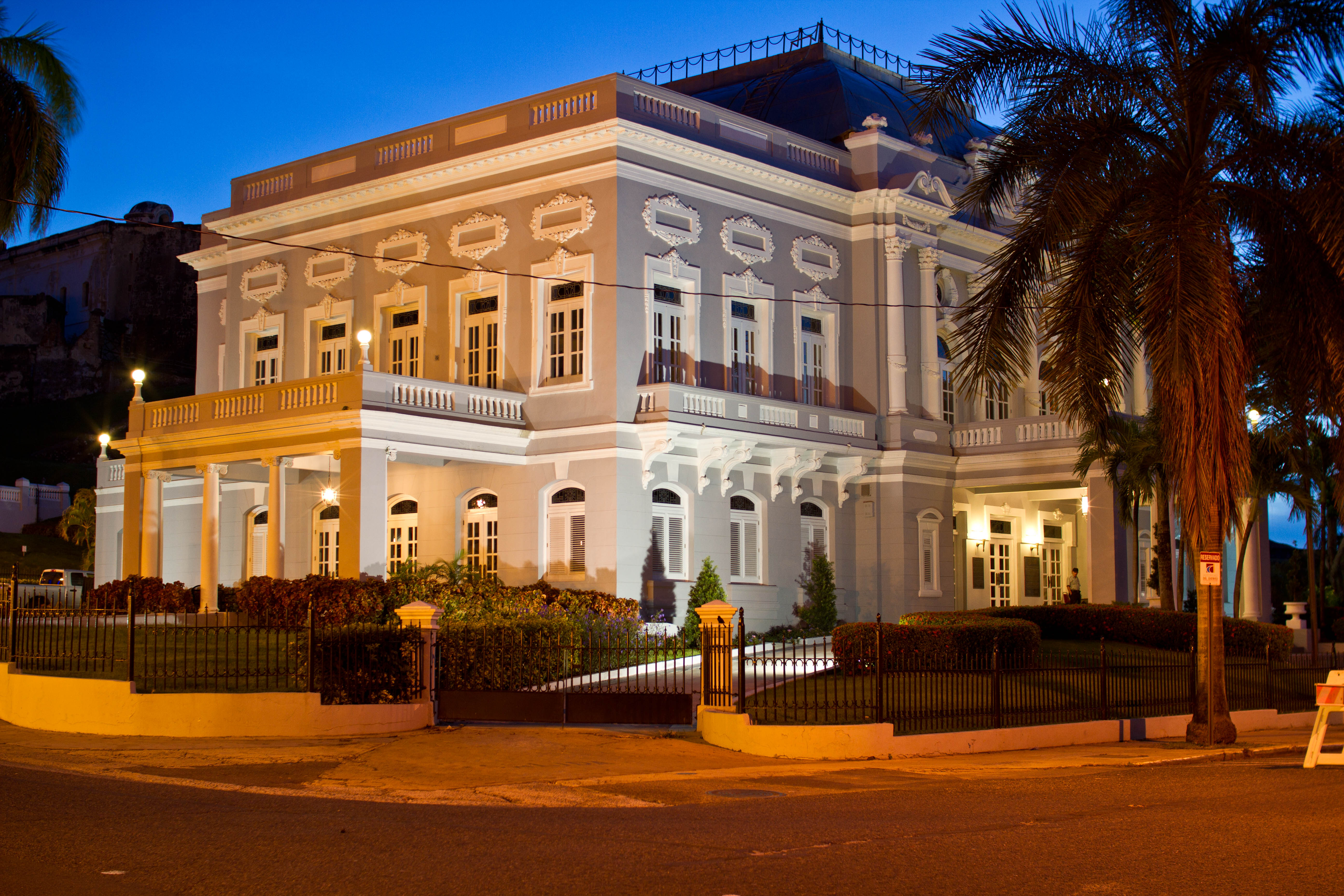

- Location within Puerto Rico
- Location: 1 Ponce de León Avenue, San Juan, Puerto Rico
- Coordinates: 18°28′5″N 66°6′41″W
- Area: 0.8 acres (0.32 ha)
- Built: 1917
- Architect: Montilla & Ferrer
- Architectural style: Beaux Arts
- Website: antiguocasinopr.com
- Part of: Old San Juan Historic District
- NRHP reference No.: 77001554
- RNSZH No.: 2000-(RMSJ)-00-JP-SH

Significant dates
- Added to NRHP: September 22, 1977
- Designated RNSZH: February 3, 2000

The Antiguo Casino de Puerto Rico, located at Avenida Ponce de León 1 in San Juan, Puerto Rico, is a Beaux Arts architecture style building dating from 1917. It was listed on the National Register of Historic Places in 1977, and on the Puerto Rico Register of Historic Sites and Zones in 2000. The Casino was intended to serve as the cultural center of the local higher classes, within which the European influence was more predominant. It was completed in 1917.

During the mid-20th Century, the government used the vacant building to host the Escuela Libre de Música Ernesto Ramos Antonini. By 1955, the school was relocated and the building became the first headquarters of the Instituto de Cultura Puertorriqueña, serving in that function until 1970.

== History ==
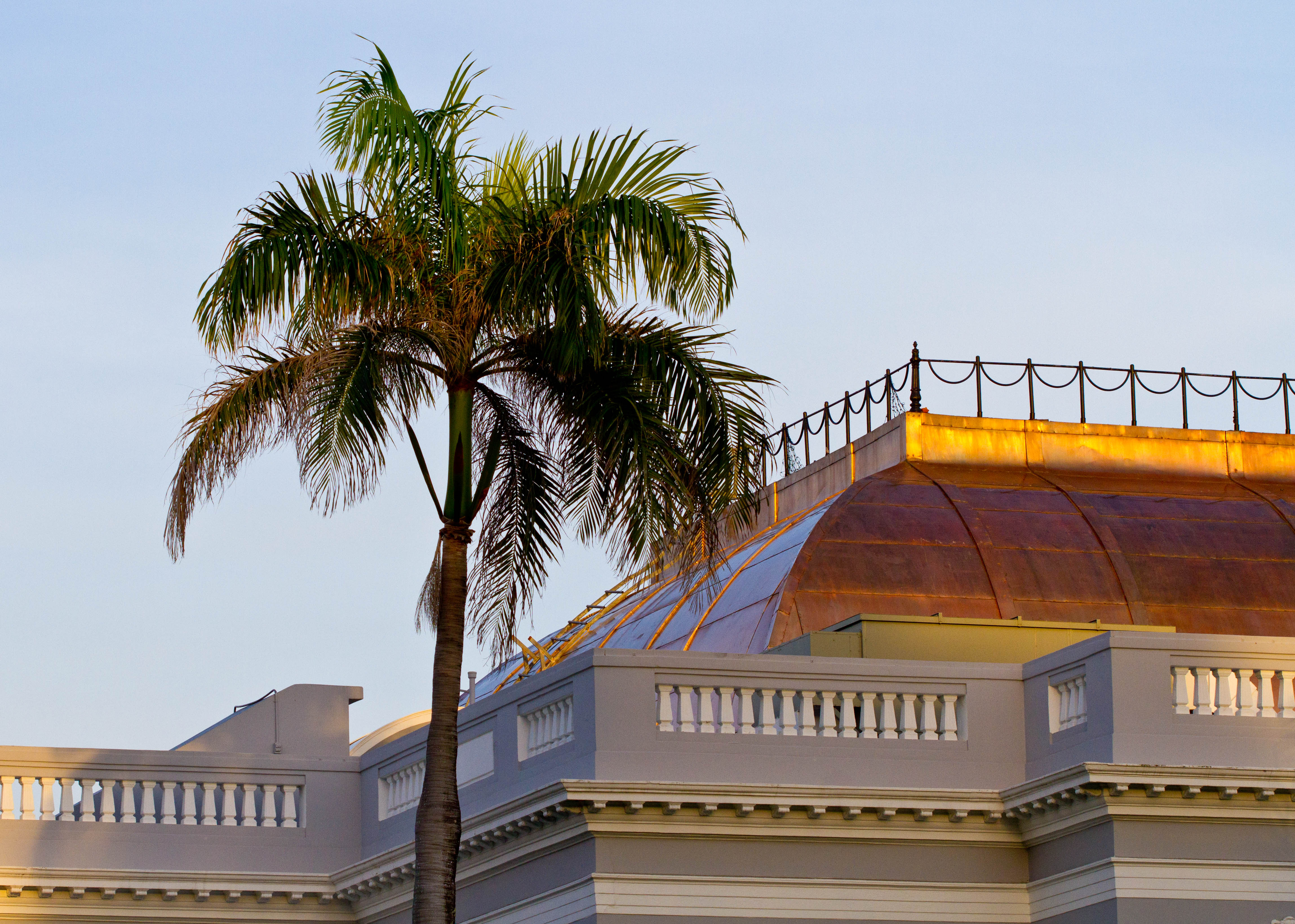
Detail of roof

The Antiguo Casino de Puerto Rico was the brainchild of a group of citizens, known as the Asociación del Casino de Puerto Rico, who requested then San Juan mayor Francisco del Valle Atiles a place to establish a new social club. The building was designed by Montilla & Ferrer and construction began under the supervision of the Del Valle Zeno brothers' firm. Construction for the new building started in 1913, with a budget of $80,000. Lack of funds caused the construction to shut down. Construction restarted in 1914, with the Jiménez y Benítez engineering handling the building work. In 1915, construction was halted once again, It was restarted a year later with sculptor José Albrizzio designing the interior. The Antiguo Casino de Puerto Rico was finally inaugurated on July 24, 1917. It was built in the grounds of what used to be Parque Borinquen. The Casino had 815 members during its first year. The Casino of Puerto Rico was described as a symbol of "the riches of a class aspired to represent the European culture of Puerto Rico". In 1997, Vivoni Farage argued that if any place in San Juan any place displayed architectonic knowledge or a sophisticated European-influenced vocabulary it was the Casino.

On December 15, 1941, the board voted to sell the Casino to the military, with the sole dissenting vote coming from José S. Alegría. It was then used to house the United Services Organization. During World War II, the building was used as an officers' club by the United States Army. Shortly after the end of the war, in 1946 the building was transferred to the government of Puerto Rico, who turned it into the Escuela Libre de Música Ernesto Ramos Antonini. During the 1930s, the Casino hosted a drama named El Grito de Lares for WNEL. It would host theater plays of all types. Its rendition of Viuda Alegre would later be aired through WKAQ. After the Institute of Puerto Rican Culture (ICP) was created in 1955, the building served as its host along the Escuela Libre de Música, occupying the space unused by the school near Plaza de Colón. Afterwards, the ICP acquired the entire building, receiving it on March 11, 1957.

Beginning on November 26, 1969, the Casino hosted the Congreso Hispanoamericano de Lexicografía, presided by Samuel R. Rodríguez of the Academia Puertorriqueña and Dámaso Alonso of the Real Academia Española de la Lengua. In the early 80s, the Puerto Rico Department of State converted the building into the Official Reception Center of the Commonwealth of Puerto Rico. In 2010, management of the facility was turned to the Puerto Rico Convention District Authority, a government agency of Puerto Rico. The Convention District Authority manages a number of facilities in the Convention Center District, in San Juan, Puerto Rico, including the Puerto Rico Convention Center.

== Features ==
The building that houses the Casino was designed by Rafael del Valle Zeno and Carlos del Valle Zeno, architect brothers who designed it in the style of the L'Ecole des Beaux Arts popularized the previous century. The building occupies a large area at the entrance of Old San Juan and it was built in a distinctly European style. Designed in a Beaux Arts style, the Antiguo Casino features gardens, balconies, moldings, white marble floors, and a grand central staircase. Its windows are placed regularly and adorned on top, and it features mansard roofs are made of slate. Three doors placed under a balcony serve as its main entrance. The interiors featured central stairs leading to the "Gran Salón" a large room featuring decorated walls and roofs and hanging lamps. One of its distinguished features is the ballroom's twelve-foot chandelier. The building is also known for its use of mirrors in the interior decoration.

The building has become a popular venue for weddings, particularly destination weddings, quinceañeras and corporate events.

== Gallery ==
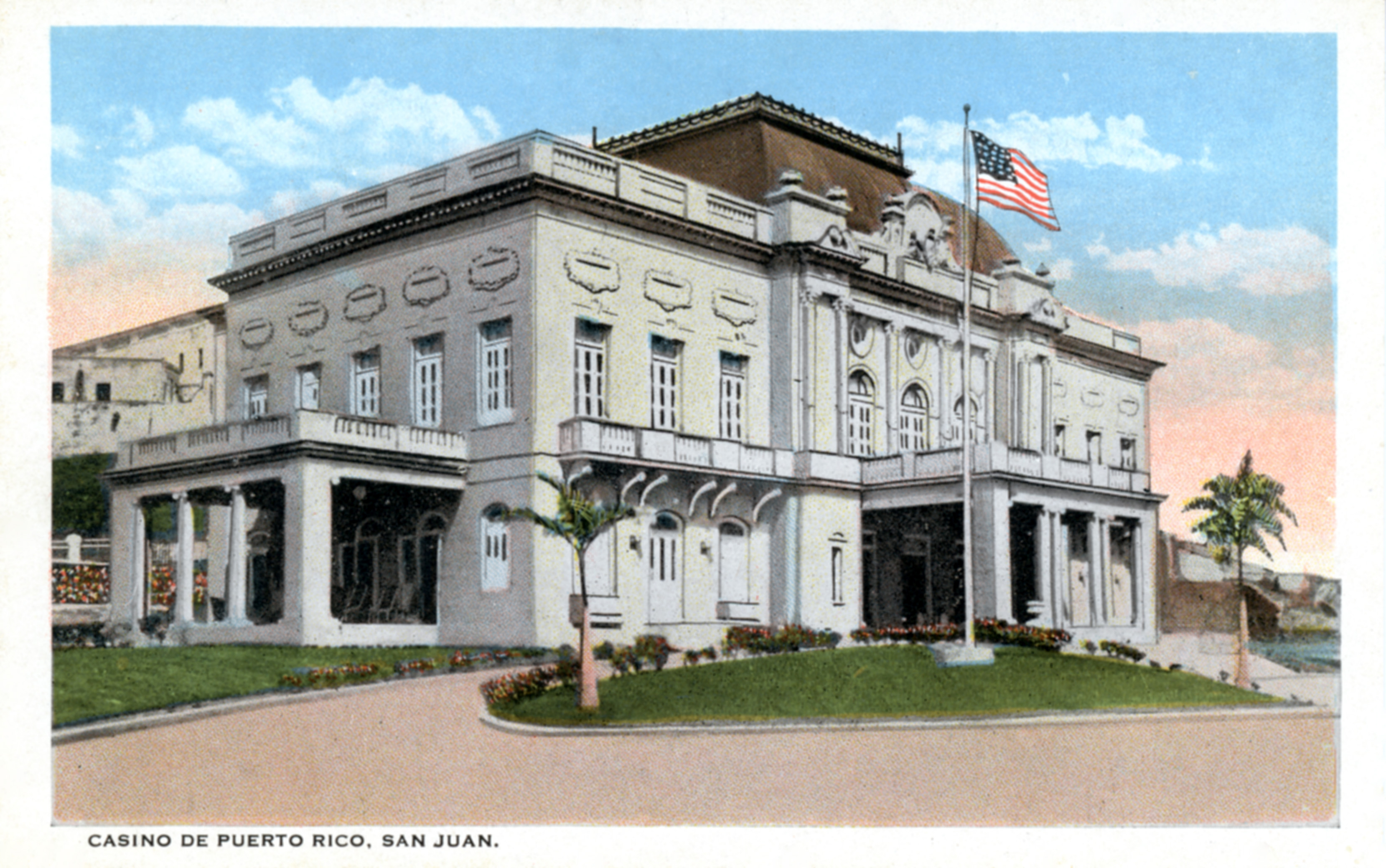
Image from 1921

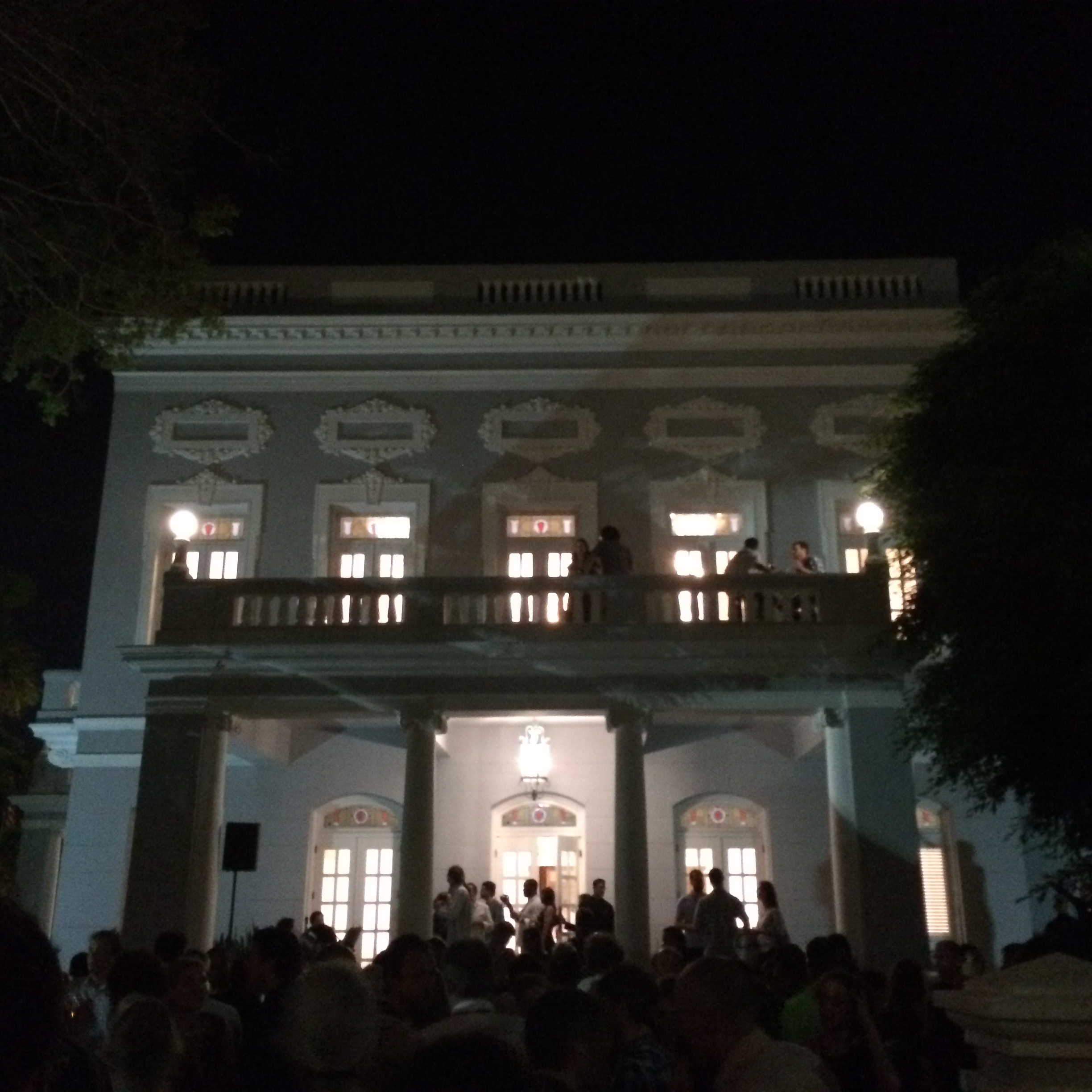
Antiguo Casino de Puerto Rico at night

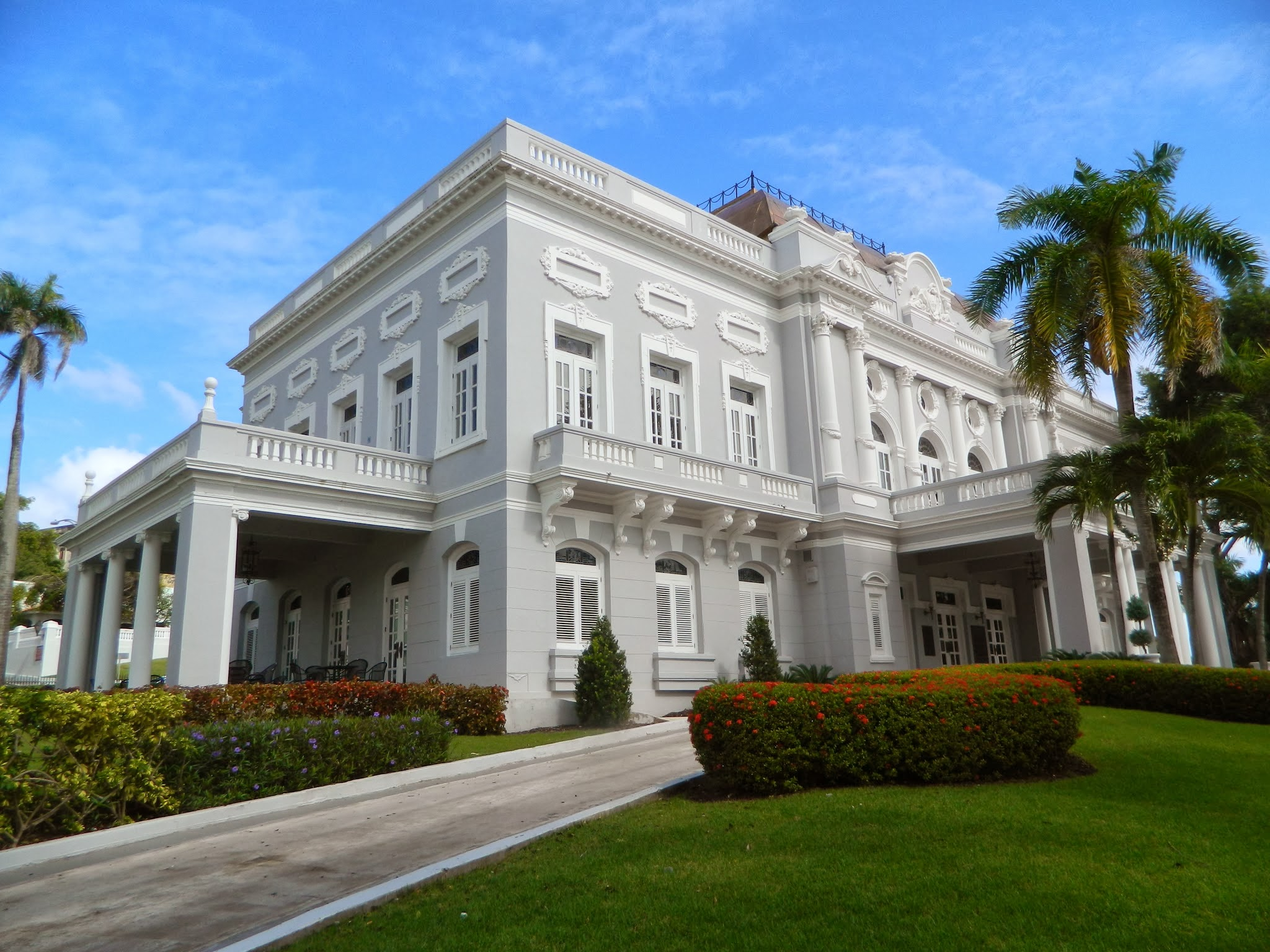
Antiguo Casino de Puerto Rico in 2013

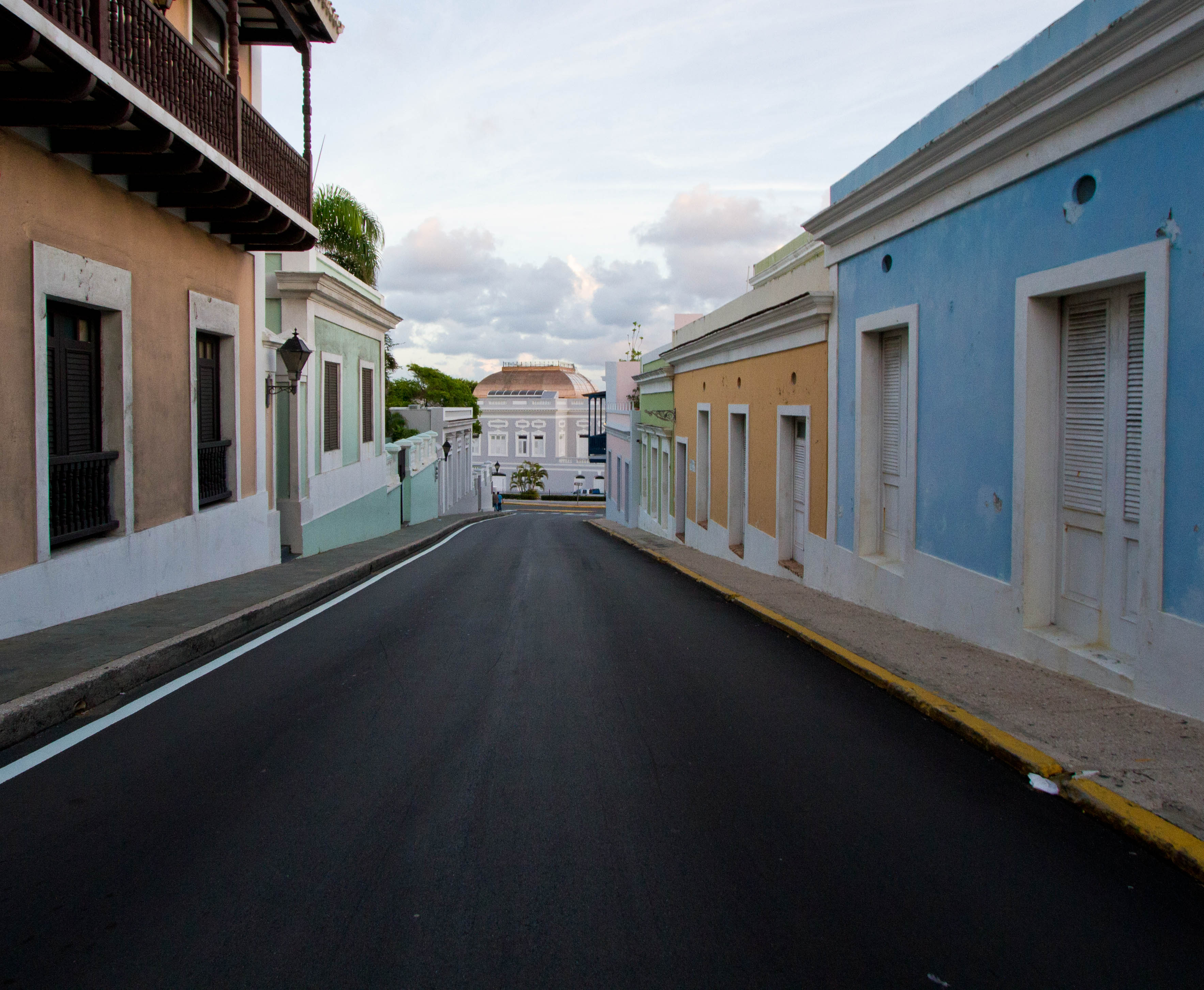
Casino at end of nearby street
