= Egypt men's national under-18 3x3 team =

National 3x3 basketball team

Egypt
- FIBA ranking: 1
- FIBA zone: FIBA Africa
- National federation: EBF

U18 World Cup
- Appearances: 7

U17 Africa Cup
- Appearances: 3
- Medals: (gold) (2019, 2022, 2023)

The Egypt men's national under-17 and under-18 3x3 team is a national basketball team of Egypt, governed by the Egyptian Basketball Federation.

== Competitions ==
=== Youth Olympic Games ===
Year	Position	Pld	W	L
2010 Singapore	13th	7	4	3
(China) 2014 Nanjing	Did not present			
(Argentina) 2018 Buenos Aires	Did not present			
Total	1/3	7	4	3

=== World Cup ===
Year	Position	Pld	W	L
(Italy) 2011 Rimini	19th	-	-	-
(Spain) 2012 Alcobendas	Did not present			
(Indonesia) 2013 Jakarta	Did not present			
(Hungary) 2015 Debrecen	14th	6	2	4
(Kazakhstan) 2016 Astana	20th	4	0	4
(China) 2017 Chengdu	Did not present			
(Mongolia) 2019 Ulaanbaatar	Did not present			
(Hungary) 2021 Debrecen	4th	7	5	2
(Hungary) 2022 Debrecen	13th	4	2	2
(Hungary) 2023 Debrecen	6th	5	3	2
(Hungary) 2024 Debrecen	13th	4	1	3
Total	7/11	30	13	17

=== Africa Cup ===
Year	Position	Pld	W	L
(Uganda) 2019 Kampala	1st (gold)	5	5	0
(Egypt) 2022 Cairo	1st (gold)	5	5	0
(Egypt) 2023 Cairo	1st (gold)	3	3	0
Total	3/3	13	13	0

== See also ==
- Egyptian Basketball Federation
- Egypt women's national 3x3 team
- Egypt men's national 3x3 team
- Egypt women's national under-18 3x3 team
