= 2022 FIBA 3x3 U18 World Cup – Men's tournament =

Basketball competition in Hungary

Tournament details
- Host country: Hungary
- City: Debrecen
- Dates: 23–28 August
- Teams: 20

Final positions
- Champions: France (1st title)
- Runners-up: Serbia
- Third place: Lithuania
- Fourth place: Ukraine

Tournament statistics
- MVP: (France) Ekwakwe Priso

The 2022 FIBA 3x3 U18 World Cup – Men's tournament is the ninth edition of this competition. The event was held in Debrecen, Hungary. It was contested by 20 teams.

France won their first title with a win against Serbia in the final.

== Host selection ==
Hungarian city, Debrecen, was given the hosting rights for the second time in a row.

== Teams ==
Africa

- Egypt

Americas

- Brazil
- Chile
- Dominican Republic
- Trinidad and Tobago
- United States

Asia and Oceania

- Bahrain
- Kazakhstan
- Kyrgyzstan
- Mongolia

Europe

- Estonia
- France
- Germany
- Hungary (hosts)
- Latvia
- Lithuania
- Portugal
- Serbia
- Slovenia
- Ukraine

== Seeding ==
The seeding and groups were as follows:

| Pool A | Pool B | Pool C | Pool D |
|---|---|---|---|
| Germany (1); Egypt (8); Serbia (9); Hungary (16) (H); Trinidad and Tobago (17) | Kyrgyzstan (2); Chile (7); Latvia (10); Mongolia (15); Portugal (18) | Estonia (3); Slovenia (6); France (11); Dominican Republic (14); United States (19) | Ukraine (4); Brazil (5); Lithuania (12); Kazakhstan (13); Bahrain (20) |

== Preliminary round ==
=== Pool A ===
| Pos | Team | Pld | W | L | PF | PA | PD | Qualification | (Serbia) | (Germany) | (Egypt) | (Hungary) | (Trinidad and Tobago) |
|---|---|---|---|---|---|---|---|---|---|---|---|---|---|
| 1 | Serbia | 4 | 4 | 0 | 83 | 51 | +32 | Quarterfinals | | 20–14 | | 21–13 | |
| 2 | Germany | 4 | 3 | 1 | 70 | 56 | +14 | Quarterfinals | | | 17–14 | 18–11 | |
| 3 | Egypt | 4 | 2 | 2 | 68 | 65 | +3 | | 13–21 | | | | 21–13 |
| 4 | Hungary (H) | 4 | 1 | 3 | 54 | 72 | −18 | | | | 14–20 | | 16–13 |
| 5 | Trinidad and Tobago | 4 | 0 | 4 | 48 | 79 | −31 | | 11–21 | 11–21 | | | |

Source: FIBA
Rules for classification: 1) Wins; 2) Head-to-head record; 3) Points scored.
(H) Hosts

=== Pool B ===
| Pos | Team | Pld | W | L | PF | PA | PD | Qualification | (Latvia) | (Portugal) | (Kyrgyzstan) | (Mongolia) | (Chile) |
|---|---|---|---|---|---|---|---|---|---|---|---|---|---|
| 1 | Latvia | 4 | 3 (Note: Latvia 18–14 Portugal) | 1 | 76 | 69 | +7 | Quarterfinals | | | 21–16 | 18–22 | |
| 2 | Portugal | 4 | 3 | 1 | 73 | 54 | +19 | Quarterfinals | 14–18 | | 21–15 | | |
| 3 | Kyrgyzstan | 4 | 2 (Note: Kyrgyzstan 21–20 Mongolia) | 2 | 68 | 74 | −6 | | | | | 21–20 | 16–12 |
| 4 | Mongolia | 4 | 2 | 2 | 78 | 71 | +7 | | | 16–17 | | | 20–15 |
| 5 | Chile | 4 | 0 | 4 | 49 | 76 | −27 | | 17–19 | 5–21 | | | |

Source: FIBA
Rules for classification: 1) Wins; 2) Head-to-head record; 3) Points scored.

=== Pool C ===
| Pos | Team | Pld | W | L | PF | PA | PD | Qualification | (France) | (Slovenia) | (United States) | (Estonia) | (Dominican Republic) |
|---|---|---|---|---|---|---|---|---|---|---|---|---|---|
| 1 | France | 4 | 4 | 0 | 83 | 56 | +27 | Quarterfinals | | | | 22–14 | 21–16 |
| 2 | Slovenia | 4 | 3 | 1 | 72 | 67 | +5 | Quarterfinals | 14–19 | | 16–15 | | |
| 3 | United States | 4 | 2 | 2 | 69 | 72 | −3 | | 12–21 | | | 21–17 | |
| 4 | Estonia | 4 | 1 | 3 | 70 | 77 | −7 | | | 18–21 | | | 21–13 |
| 5 | Dominican Republic | 4 | 0 | 4 | 62 | 84 | −22 | | | 15–21 | 18–21 | | |

Source: FIBA
Rules for classification: 1) Wins; 2) Head-to-head record; 3) Points scored.

=== Pool D ===
| Pos | Team | Pld | W | L | PF | PA | PD | Qualification | (Lithuania) | (Ukraine) | (Brazil) | (Kazakhstan) | (Bahrain) |
|---|---|---|---|---|---|---|---|---|---|---|---|---|---|
| 1 | Lithuania | 4 | 4 | 0 | 84 | 50 | +34 | Quarterfinals | | 21–16 | | 22–6 | |
| 2 | Ukraine | 4 | 3 | 1 | 80 | 62 | +18 | Quarterfinals | | | 21–16 | 21–13 | |
| 3 | Brazil | 4 | 2 | 2 | 75 | 71 | +4 | | 16–21 | | | | 21–10 |
| 4 | Kazakhstan | 4 | 1 | 3 | 57 | 79 | −22 | | | | 19–22 | | 19–14 |
| 5 | Bahrain | 4 | 0 | 4 | 48 | 82 | −34 | | 12–20 | 12–22 | | | |

Source: FIBA
Rules for classification: 1) Wins; 2) Head-to-head record; 3) Points scored.

== Knockout stage ==
All times are local.

Quarter-finals
27 Aug 2022 – 12:20
Serbia | 21
Slovenia | 15
27 Aug 2022 – 10:30
Lithuania | 21
Portugal | 14
27 Aug 2022 – 10:55
Latvia | 15
Ukraine | 21
27 Aug 2022 – 12:45
France | 15
Germany | 13

Semi-finals
28 Aug 2022 – 18:55
Serbia | 21
Lithuania | 19
28 Aug 2022 – 19:15
Ukraine | 11
France | 18

Final
28 Aug 2022 – 21:05
Serbia | 17
France | 21
Bronze medal
28 Aug 2022 – 20:05
Lithuania | 18
Ukraine | 17

== Final standings ==
=== Tiebreakers ===
- 1) Wins
- 2) Points scored
- 3) Seeding

| Pos | Team | Pld | W | L | PF | PA | PD |
|---|---|---|---|---|---|---|---|
| 1 | France | 7 | 7 | 0 | 137 | 97 | +40 |
| 2 | Serbia | 7 | 6 | 1 | 142 | 106 | +36 |
| 3 | Lithuania | 7 | 6 | 1 | 142 | 102 | +9 |
| 4 | Ukraine | 7 | 4 | 3 | 121 | 103 | +18 |
| 5 | Latvia | 5 | 3 | 2 | 91 | 90 | +1 |
| 6 | Slovenia | 5 | 3 | 2 | 87 | 88 | –1 |
| 7 | Portugal | 5 | 3 | 2 | 87 | 75 | +12 |
| 8 | Germany | 5 | 3 | 2 | 83 | 71 | +12 |
| 9 | Mongolia | 4 | 2 | 2 | 78 | 71 | +7 |
| 10 | Brazil | 4 | 2 | 2 | 75 | 71 | +4 |
| 11 | United States | 4 | 2 | 2 | 69 | 72 | –3 |
| 12 | Kyrgyzstan | 4 | 2 | 2 | 68 | 74 | –6 |
| 13 | Egypt | 4 | 2 | 2 | 68 | 65 | +3 |
| 14 | Estonia | 4 | 1 | 3 | 70 | 77 | –7 |
| 15 | Kazakhstan | 4 | 1 | 3 | 57 | 79 | –22 |
| 16 | Hungary | 4 | 1 | 3 | 54 | 72 | –18 |
| 17 | Dominican Republic | 4 | 0 | 4 | 62 | 84 | –22 |
| 18 | Chile | 4 | 0 | 4 | 49 | 76 | –27 |
| 19 | Trinidad and Tobago | 4 | 0 | 4 | 48 | 79 | –31 |
| 20 | Bahrain | 4 | 0 | 4 | 48 | 82 | –34 |

== Awards ==
These players were given the awards after the competition:

=== Most valuable player ===
- (France) Ekwakwe Priso

=== Top scorer ===
- (Lithuania) Rokas Jocys (81 points)

=== Team of the tournament ===
- (France) Ekwakwe Priso
- (Serbia) Milan Suput
- (Lithuania) Rokas Jocys

== See also ==
- 2022 FIBA 3x3 World Cup – Men's tournament
- 2022 FIBA 3x3 World Cup – Women's tournament
- 2022 FIBA 3x3 AmeriCup – Men's tournament
- 2022 FIBA 3x3 AmeriCup – Women's tournament
- 2022 FIBA 3x3 U18 World Cup – Women's tournament
- 2022 FIBA 3x3 Africa Cup
- 2022 FIBA 3x3 U17 Africa Cup – Men's tournament
- 2022 FIBA 3x3 U17 Africa Cup – Women's tournament
- 2022 FIBA 3x3 Asia Cup
- 2022 FIBA 3x3 Europe Cup
