= 2023 FIBA 3x3 Africa Cup – Men's tournament =

Tournament details
- Host country: Egypt
- City: Cairo
- Dates: December 1–3
- Teams: 8

Final positions
- Champions: Egypt (2nd title)
- Runners-up: Nigeria
- Third place: Madagascar
- Fourth place: Algeria

Tournament statistics
- MVP: (Egypt) Ramy Basha

The 2023 FIBA 3x3 Africa Cup – Men's tournament is the fifth edition of this continental championship. The event was held in Cairo, Egypt for the second consecutive year. It was contested by 8 teams.

Egypt won their second title with a win over Nigeria in the final.

== Host selection ==
Egypt's capital, Cairo, was given the hosting rights on 31 May 2022.

== Participating teams ==
All African National Federations were invited to register a team for the FIBA 3x3 Africa Cup 2023.

Pool A

- Egypt (1)
- Algeria (3)
- Uganda (4)
- Senegal (8) (withdrew)
- Nigeria (9)

Pool B

- Benin (2)
- Kenya (5)
- Madagascar (6)
- Morocco (7)
- Mali (10) (withdrew)

== Preliminary round ==
The pools were announced on July 20, 2023.

=== Pool A ===
Pos	Team	Pld	W	L	PF	PA	PD	Qualification	(Egypt)	(Nigeria)	(Algeria)	(Uganda)	(Senegal)
1	Egypt (H)	3	3	0	55	44	+11	Semi-finals			19–17		Canc.
2	Nigeria	3	1	2	49	50	−1	Quarter-finals	16–19			20–16	Canc.
3	Algeria	3	1	2	46	47	−1	Quarter-finals		15–13		14–15	Canc.
4	Uganda	3	1	2	42	51	−9		11–17				Canc.
5	Senegal	0	0	0	0	0	0	Withdrew	Canc.	Canc.	Canc.	Canc.	

Source: FIBA
Rules for classification: 1) Wins; 2) Head-to-head record; 3) Points scored.
(H) Hosts

=== Pool B ===
Pos	Team	Pld	W	L	PF	PA	PD	Qualification	(Madagascar)	(Benin)	(Kenya)	(Morocco)	(Mali)
1	Madagascar	3	2 (Note: Madagascar 21–12 Benin)	1	53	46	+7	Semi-finals		21–12		13–16	Canc.
2	Benin	3	2	1	43	47	−4	Quarter-finals			18–16	13–10	Canc.
3	Kenya	3	1 (Note: Kenya 15–14 Morocco)	2	49	51	−2	Quarter-finals	18–19				Canc.
4	Morocco	3	1	2	40	41	−1				14–15		Canc.
5	Mali	0	0	0	0	0	0	Withdrew	Canc.	Canc.	Canc.	Canc.	

Source: FIBA
Rules for classification: 1) Wins; 2) Head-to-head record; 3) Points scored.

== Knockout stage ==
All times are local.

Quarter-finals
3 Dec 2023 – 15:50
Benin	19
Algeria	20
3 Dec 2023 – 16:15
Nigeria (OT)	19
Kenya	17

Semi-finals
3 Dec 2023 – 17:50
Egypt	18
Algeria	16
3 Dec 2023 – 18:15
Madagascar	15
Nigeria	17

Final
3 Dec 2023 – 20:15
Egypt	18
Nigeria	15
Bronze medal
3 Dec 2023 – 19:25
Algeria	16
Madagascar	20

== Final standings ==
Pos	Team	Pld	W	L	PF	PA	PD
1	Egypt	5	5	0	91	75	+16
2	Nigeria	6	3	3	100	100	0
3	Madagascar	5	4	1	88	79	+9
4	Algeria	6	2	4	98	94	+4
5	Benin	4	2	2	62	67	–5
6	Kenya	4	1	3	66	70	–4
7	Uganda	3	0	3	42	51	–9
8	Morocco	3	0	3	40	41	–1

== Awards ==
These players were given the awards after the competition:

=== Most valuable player ===
- (Egypt) Ramy Basha

=== Top scorer ===
- (Madagascar) Elly Randriamampionona (46 points)

=== Team of the tournament ===
- (Egypt) Ramy Basha
- (Nigeria) Robert Chima Ukawuba
- (Madagascar) Elly Randriamampionona

== See also ==
- 2023 FIBA 3x3 World Cup – Men's tournament
- 2023 FIBA 3x3 World Cup – Women's tournament
- 2023 FIBA 3x3 U18 World Cup – Men's tournament
- 2023 FIBA 3x3 U18 World Cup – Women's tournament
- 2023 FIBA 3x3 Africa Cup – Women's tournament
- 2023 FIBA 3x3 U17 Africa Cup – Men's tournament
- 2023 FIBA 3x3 U17 Africa Cup – Women's tournament
- 2023 FIBA 3x3 Asia Cup
- 2023 FIBA 3x3 AmeriCup – Men's tournament
- 2023 FIBA 3x3 AmeriCup – Women's tournament
- 2023 FIBA 3x3 Europe Cup
