= 2023 FIBA 3x3 U18 World Cup – Men's tournament =

Basketball competition in Hungary

Tournament details
- Host country: Hungary
- City: Debrecen
- Dates: 29 August–3 September
- Teams: 19

Final positions
- Champions: Germany (1st title)
- Runners-up: France
- Third place: Slovenia
- Fourth place: Estonia

Tournament statistics
- MVP: (Germany) Fabian Giessmann

The 2023 FIBA 3x3 U18 World Cup – Men's tournament is the tenth edition of this competition. For the third time, the event was held in Debrecen, Hungary. It was contested by 19 teams.

Germany won their first title with a win against France in the final.

== Host selection ==
For the third time in a row, Hungarian city, Debrecen, was given the hosting rights.

== Teams ==
Africa

- (Democratic Republic of the Congo) Congo DR (withdrew)
- Egypt
- Morocco
- Tunisia

Americas

- Brazil

Asia and Oceania

- India
- Japan
- Kyrgyzstan
- Mongolia
- Qatar
- Thailand

Europe

- Estonia
- France
- Germany
- Hungary (hosts)
- Israel
- Latvia
- Serbia
- Slovenia
- Ukraine

== Seeding ==
The seeding and groups were as follows:

Pool A	Pool B	Pool C	Pool D
Germany (1); Qatar (8); Tunisia (9) (Democratic Republic of the Congo) Congo DR (16) (withdrew); Mongolia (17)	Estonia (2); Brazil (7); Slovenia (10); Serbia (15); Morocco (18)	Thailand (3); Egypt (6); France (11); Japan (14); Hungary (19) (H)	Latvia (4); Kyrgyzstan (5); Ukraine (12); India (13); Israel (20)

== Preliminary round ==
=== Pool A ===
Pos	Team	Pld	W	L	PF	PA	PD	Qualification	(Germany)	(Qatar)	(Mongolia)	(Tunisia)	(Democratic Republic of the Congo)
1	Germany	3	3	0	64	29	+35	Quarterfinals		21–13			Canc.
2	Qatar	3	2	1	55	48	+7	Quarterfinals			21–12	21–15	Canc.
3	Mongolia	3	1	2	41	52	−11		7–21			22–10	Canc.
4	Tunisia	3	0	3	34	65	−31		9–22				Canc.
5	(Democratic Republic of the Congo) Congo DR	0	0	0	0	0	0	Withdrew	Canc.	Canc.	Canc.	Canc.	

Source: FIBA
Rules for classification: 1) Wins; 2) Head-to-head record; 3) Points scored.

=== Pool B ===
Pos	Team	Pld	W	L	PF	PA	PD	Qualification	(Slovenia)	(Estonia)	(Serbia)	(Brazil)	(Morocco)
1	Slovenia	4	3 (Note: Slovenia 21–16 Estonia)	1	81	75	+6	Quarterfinals		21–16	21–20		
2	Estonia	4	3	1	79	59	+20	Quarterfinals			20–12	21–16	
3	Serbia	4	2 (Note: Serbia 22–10 Brazil)	2	76	62	+14					22–10	22–11
4	Brazil	4	2	2	64	78	−14		21–19				17–16
5	Morocco	4	0	4	55	81	−26		18–20	10–22			

Source: FIBA
Rules for classification: 1) Wins; 2) Head-to-head record; 3) Points scored.

=== Pool C ===
Pos	Team	Pld	W	L	PF	PA	PD	Qualification	(France)	(Egypt)	(Hungary)	(Japan)	(Thailand)
1	France	4	3 (Note: France 21–15 Egypt)	1	81	66	+15	Quarterfinals				18–21	21–10
2	Egypt	4	3	1	73	62	+11	Quarterfinals	15–21		21–15		
3	Hungary (H)	4	2 (Note: Hungary 21–19 Japan)	2	78	78	0		20–21				22–17
4	Japan	4	2	2	81	69	+12			19–21	19–21		
5	Thailand	4	0	4	43	81	−38			7–16		9–22	

Source: FIBA
Rules for classification: 1) Wins; 2) Head-to-head record; 3) Points scored.
(H) Hosts

=== Pool D ===
Pos	Team	Pld	W	L	PF	PA	PD	Qualification	(Israel)	(Latvia)	(India)	(Kyrgyzstan)	(Ukraine)
1	Israel	4	3 (Note: Israel 22–19 Latvia)	1	80	62	+18	Quarterfinals		22–19			17–14
2	Latvia	4	3	1	83	60	+23	Quarterfinals			21–13	22–10	
3	India	4	2	2	71	65	+6		21–19			21–7	
4	Kyrgyzstan	4	1 (Note: Kyrgyzstan 21–20 Ukraine)	3	46	85	−39		8–22				21–20
5	Ukraine	4	1	3	67	75	−8			15–21	18–16		

Source: FIBA
Rules for classification: 1) Wins; 2) Head-to-head record; 3) Points scored.

== Knockout stage ==
All times are local.

Quarter-finals
3 Sep 2023 – 10:50
Germany	19 OT
Egypt	17
3 Sep 2023 – 11:15
Israel	5
Estonia	22
3 Sep 2023 – 12:40
Slovenia	18
Latvia	13
3 Sep 2023 – 13:05
France	18
Qatar	15

Semi-finals
3 Sep 2023 – 14:30
Germany	16
Estonia	11
3 Sep 2023 – 14:55
Slovenia	15
France	21

Final
3 Sep 2023 – 20:35
Germany	20
France	18
Bronze medal
3 Sep 2023 – 19:35
Estonia	15
Slovenia	16

== Final standings ==
=== Tiebreakers ===
- 1) Wins
- 2) Points scored
- 3) Seeding

Pos	Team	Pld	W	L	PF	PA	PD
1	Germany	7	7	0	119	75	+44
2	France	7	5	2	138	116	+22
3	Slovenia	7	5	2	130	124	+6
4	Estonia	7	4	3	127	86	+41
5	Latvia	5	3	2	96	78	+18
6	Egypt	5	3	2	90	81	+9
7	Qatar	4	2	2	70	66	+4
8	Israel	5	3	2	85	84	+1
9	Japan	4	2	2	81	69	+12
10	Hungary	4	2	2	78	78	0
11	Serbia	4	2	2	76	62	+14
12	India	4	2	2	71	65	+6
13	Brazil	4	2	2	64	78	–14
14	Mongolia	3	1	2	41	52	–11
15	Ukraine	4	1	3	67	75	–8
16	Kyrgyzstan	4	1	3	46	85	–39
17	Tunisia	3	0	3	34	65	–31
18	Morocco	4	0	4	55	81	–26
19	Thailand	4	0	4	43	81	–20

== Awards ==
These players were given the awards after the competition:

=== Most valuable player ===
- (Germany) Fabian Giessmann

=== Top scorer ===
- (Germany) Fabian Giessmann (67 points)

=== Team of the tournament ===
- (Germany) Fabian Giessmann
- (France) Evan Boisdur
- (Slovenia) Jure Rener

== See also ==
- 2023 FIBA 3x3 World Cup – Men's tournament
- 2023 FIBA 3x3 World Cup – Women's tournament
- 2023 FIBA 3x3 AmeriCup – Men's tournament
- 2023 FIBA 3x3 AmeriCup – Women's tournament
- 2023 FIBA 3x3 U18 World Cup – Women's tournament
- 2023 FIBA 3x3 Africa Cup – Men's tournament
- 2023 FIBA 3x3 Africa Cup – Women's tournament
- 2023 FIBA 3x3 U17 Africa Cup – Men's tournament
- 2023 FIBA 3x3 U17 Africa Cup – Women's tournament
- 2023 FIBA 3x3 Asia Cup
- 2023 FIBA 3x3 Europe Cup
