= 2023 FIBA 3x3 U17 Africa Cup – Women's tournament =

Tournament details
- Host country: Egypt
- City: Cairo
- Dates: November 30
- Teams: 5

Final positions
- Champions: Egypt (2nd title)
- Runners-up: Morocco
- Third place: Uganda
- Fourth place: Algeria

Tournament statistics
- MVP: (Egypt) Oushy Salem

The 2023 FIBA 3x3 U17 Africa Cup – Women's tournament is the third edition of this continental championship. The event was held in Cairo, Egypt for the second consecutive year. It was contested by 5 teams.

Egypt are the defending champions. Egypt successfully defended their crown with a win over Morocco in the final.

== Host selection ==
Egypt's capital, Cairo, was given the hosting rights on 31 May 2022.

== Participating teams ==
All African National Federations were invited to register a team for the 2023 FIBA 3x3 U17 Africa Cup.

Pool A

- Egypt (1)
- Algeria (4)
- Mali (5) (withdrew)

Pool B

- Benin (2)
- Morocco (3)
- Uganda (6)

== Preliminary round ==
The pools were announced on July 20, 2023.

=== Pool A ===
Pos	Team	Pld	W	L	PF	PA	PD	Qualification	(Egypt)	(Algeria)	(Mali)
1	Egypt (H)	1	1	0	16	8	+8	Semi-finals		16–8	Canc.
2	Algeria	1	0	1	8	16	−8	Semi-finals	8–16		Canc.
3	Mali	0	0	0	0	0	0	Withdrew	Canc.	Canc.	

Source: FIBA
Rules for classification: 1) Wins; 2) Head-to-head record; 3) Points scored.
(H) Hosts

=== Pool B ===
Pos	Team	Pld	W	L	PF	PA	PD	Qualification	(Morocco)	(Uganda)	(Benin)
1	Morocco	2	2	0	27	12	+15	Semi-finals		21–8	
2	Uganda	2	1	1	29	28	+1	Semi-finals			
3	Benin	2	0	2	11	27	−16		4–6	7–21	

Source: FIBA
Rules for classification: 1) Wins; 2) Head-to-head record; 3) Points scored.

== Knockout stage ==
All times are local.

Semi-finals
30 Nov 2023 – 17:10
Egypt	19
Uganda	16
30 Nov 2023 – 17:35
Morocco	14
Algeria	10

Final
30 Nov 2023 – 19:50
Egypt	21
Morocco	9
Bronze medal
30 Nov 2023 – 19:00
Uganda	18
Algeria	5

== Final standings ==
Pos	Team	Pld	W	L	PF	PA	PD
1	Egypt	3	3	0	56	33	+23
2	Morocco	4	3	1	50	43	+7
3	Uganda	4	2	2	63	52	+11
4	Algeria	3	0	3	23	48	–25
5	Benin	2	0	2	11	27	–16

== Awards ==
These players were given the awards after the competition:

=== Most valuable player ===
- (Egypt) Oushy Salem

=== Top scorer ===
- (Uganda) Mia Alaba (25 points)

=== Team of the tournament ===
- (Egypt) Oushy Salem
- (Morocco) Aya Elkalali
- (Uganda) Mia Alaba

== See also ==
- 2023 FIBA 3x3 U17 Africa Cup – Men's tournament
- 2023 FIBA 3x3 World Cup – Men's tournament
- 2023 FIBA 3x3 World Cup – Women's tournament
- 2023 FIBA 3x3 U18 World Cup – Men's tournament
- 2023 FIBA 3x3 U18 World Cup – Women's tournament
- 2023 FIBA 3x3 Africa Cup – Men's tournament
- 2023 FIBA 3x3 Africa Cup – Women's tournament
- 2023 FIBA 3x3 Asia Cup
- 2023 FIBA 3x3 AmeriCup – Men's tournament
- 2023 FIBA 3x3 AmeriCup – Women's tournament
- 2023 FIBA 3x3 Europe Cup
