= Puerto Rico Convention Center =

Convention center in Isla Grande, San Juan, Puerto Rico

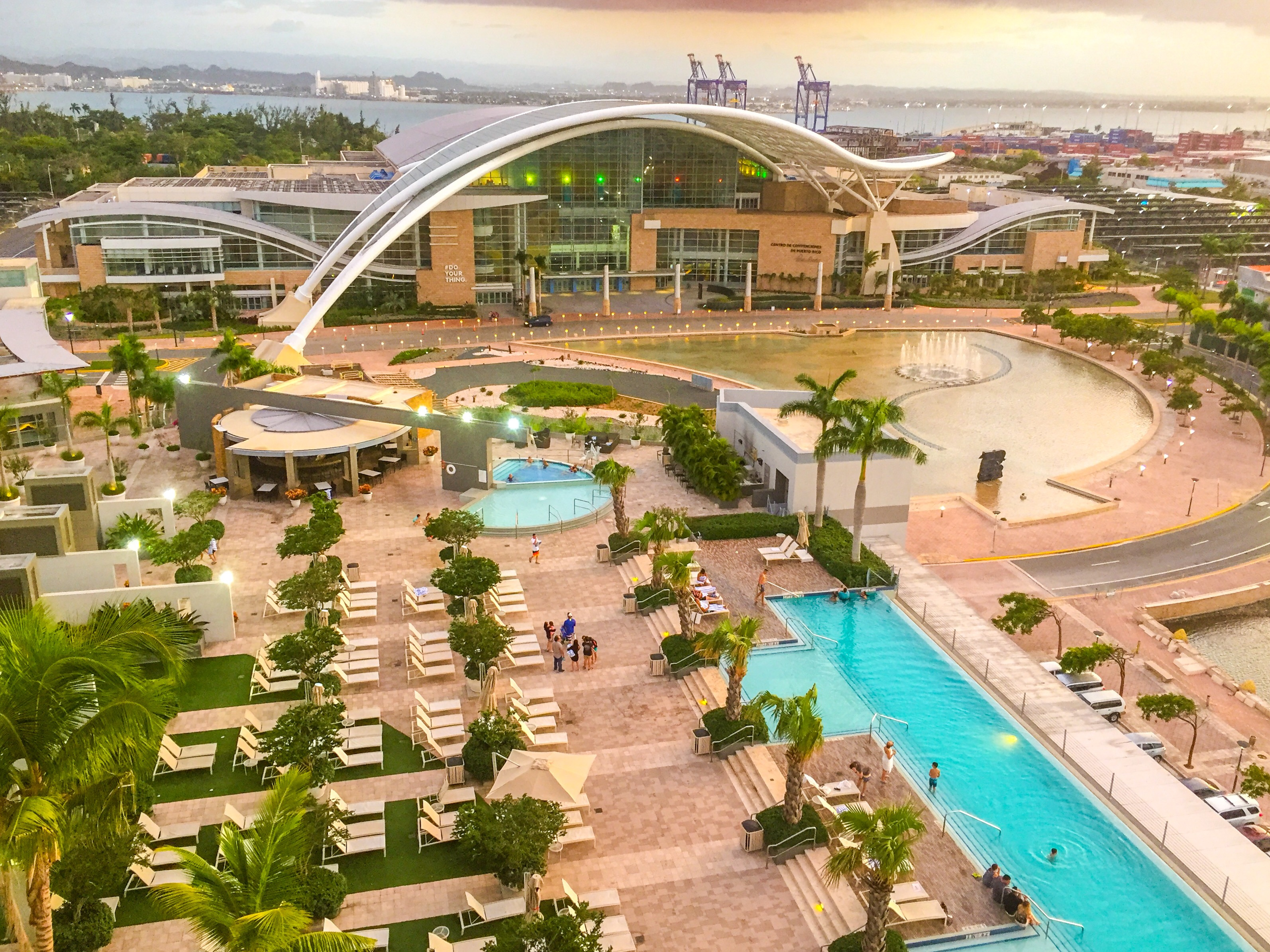
- Interactive map of Puerto Rico Convention Center
- Address: 100 Bulevar Saint John, Isla Grande, 00907
- Location: Isla Grande (Santurce), San Juan, Puerto Rico
- Coordinates: 18.452778°N 66.0925°W
- Owner: Puerto Rico Convention Center District Authority

Construction
- Built: 2000
- Opened: November 18, 2005; 20 years ago

Website
- www.prconvention.com/en/

The Dr. Pedro Rosselló González Puerto Rico Convention Center (PRCC) (or Centro de Convenciones de Puerto Rico Dr. Pedro Rosselló González in Spanish), or simply Puerto Rico Convention Center, is a convention center located in Isla Grande (recently named the Convention Center District), in San Juan, Puerto Rico owned by the Puerto Rico Convention Center District Authority, a government agency of Puerto Rico, and managed by ASM Global . With a total space of 600,000-square-foot (55,742 m2) and designed by tvsdesign, it is the largest convention center in the Caribbean and one of the most technologically advanced in the Americas.

The Convention Center includes a 152,700-square-foot (14,190 m^{2}) Exhibition Hall that can seat up to 16,965 people and a 39,500-square-foot (3,670 m^{2}) ballroom that can accommodate up to 4,158 people. All in all, approximately 30,000 people can be accommodated within the center simultaneously and can handle conventions of organizations as large as 10,000 participants. The current PRCC general manager is Jorge Pérez.

The center is operated by the Puerto Rico Convention Center District Authority, which also operates the José Miguel Agrelot Coliseum, also known as the "Choliseo", and the Government Reception Center, known as the Antiguo Casino de Puerto Rico, in Old San Juan, as well as the 113-acre district on which the Convention Center and the attached Sheraton hotel are located. Its current executive director is Omar Marrero.

The convention center is named after former Governor Pedro Rosselló, who proposed and initiated the design, finance and construction of the structure.

After the hit from Hurricane Maria during the 2017 Atlantic hurricane season, events at the Puerto Rico Convention Center were cancelled from mid-September through the end of the year while the facility was used as a warehouse and collection center by the Puerto Rican Government to provide food, water and basic necessities to those affected by the deadliest and costliest hurricane in Puerto Rican history. The Convention Center re-opened in early 2018 and has been hosting a wide range of events since. Numerous improvements, such as Distrito T-Mobile, have been made around the convention center area as well, which offers hotels, restaurants, casinos and other amenities.

== History ==
1994 - Governor Rosselló and Puerto Rico Tourism Company Executive Director Luis Fortuño announce the development of the Golden Triangle Project to be located in the Miramar section of Santurce, the old Isla Grande naval station and the Puerta de Tierra section of San Juan.

1996 - Design of new Convention Center commences

1997 - Three-year long relocation and razing of state government facilities at old Isla Grande naval station begins

2000 - Groundbreaking ceremony held and construction begins

2001 - Puerto Rico Convention Center District Authority begins operations

2005 - Gov. Aníbal Acevedo Vilá inaugurates Convention Center

2009 - Convention Center achieves 1.5 million visitors in 1,500 Events

2009 - Sheraton's anchor Hotel at the Convention District initiates operations

2010 - Gov. Luis Fortuño signs law naming center after his predecessor, Gov. Rosselló, and approves plan for District Live, an entertainment complex next to the center.

2015 - The PRCC celebrates its tenth anniversary and 4.7 million visitors.

2021 - Gov. Pedro Pierluisi inaugurates Distrito T-Mobile.

== Planning and construction ==
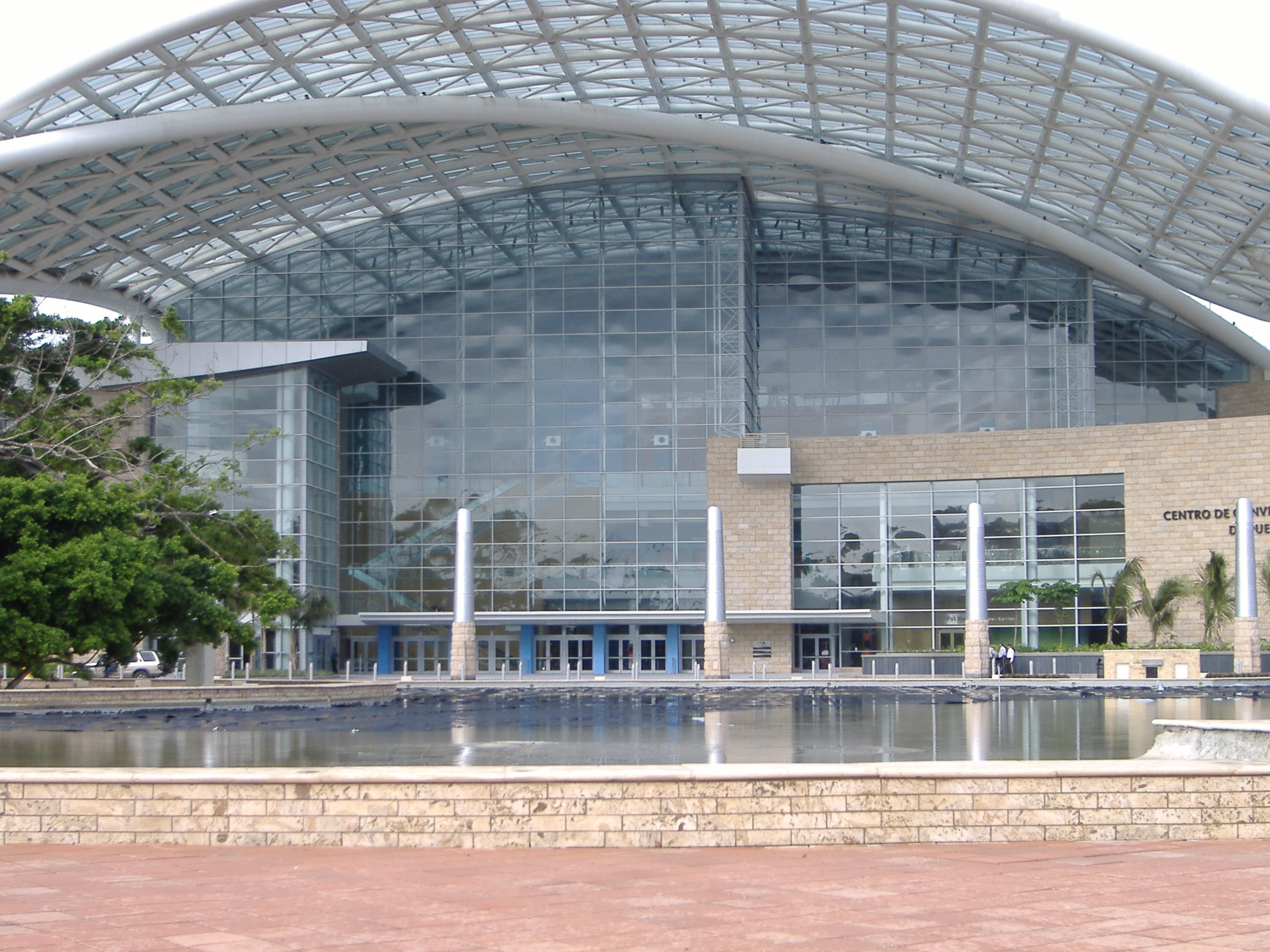
The PRCC main entrance

The Convention Center's design was inspired by the ocean. It has a signature roof imitating a wave, and the ocean theme continues throughout the facility, including details like its custom designed carpets and door pulls.

=== Location ===
The PRCC is located in the San Juan peninsula known as the Isla Grande in what used to be a US Naval Base in Isla Grande. The PRCC is located next to the Isla Grande Airport and Port of San Juan Pan American Pier.

== The PRCC District ==
The PRCC is part of a planned Puerto Rico Convention Center District (master-planned by Sasaki Associates). The main project is the Aloft hotel with 177 rooms, and a music hall which can seat 6,000 visitors, as well as a Caribbean Cinemas. The Puerto Rican government selected Starwood, under its Sheraton flag, to operate the reported $209 million facility, known as the Sheraton Puerto Rico Hotel & Casino. With these two hotels and others in the area, the district now has 1,762 hotel rooms available for visitors.

In recent years a number of projects have been under construction, including several restaurants and bars, an entertainment event venue known as Distrito T-Mobile, a container park and the EcoExploratorio (an interactive museum and aquarium). Additionally, the Puerto Rico Film District composed by film studios and other features, including a university, is being built within the zone.

== Facilities and services ==
The convention center is able to accommodate groups of up to 30,000 people with a total space of 600,000 square feet (56,000 m^{2}) and 152,700 square feet (14,190 m^{2}) of exhibit space subdivided into three halls, all on one level. The center has adjacent parking lots with a total capacity of 2,215 vehicles, although this may be increased in the future.

The facility can provide broadband and wireless internet connectivity, video conferencing, and simultaneous language translations, among others throughout the center. All meeting rooms and ballrooms are equipped with Ethernet connection and capabilities. It also has a business center which assists business guests and attendees by providing computer and typewriter rental, printing, secretarial service, copying, fax transmission and receipt, package shipping, office products, and other services. A central security office is located within the center. The center also has inhouse catering, concessions and cleaning services for any and all activities.

== Gallery ==
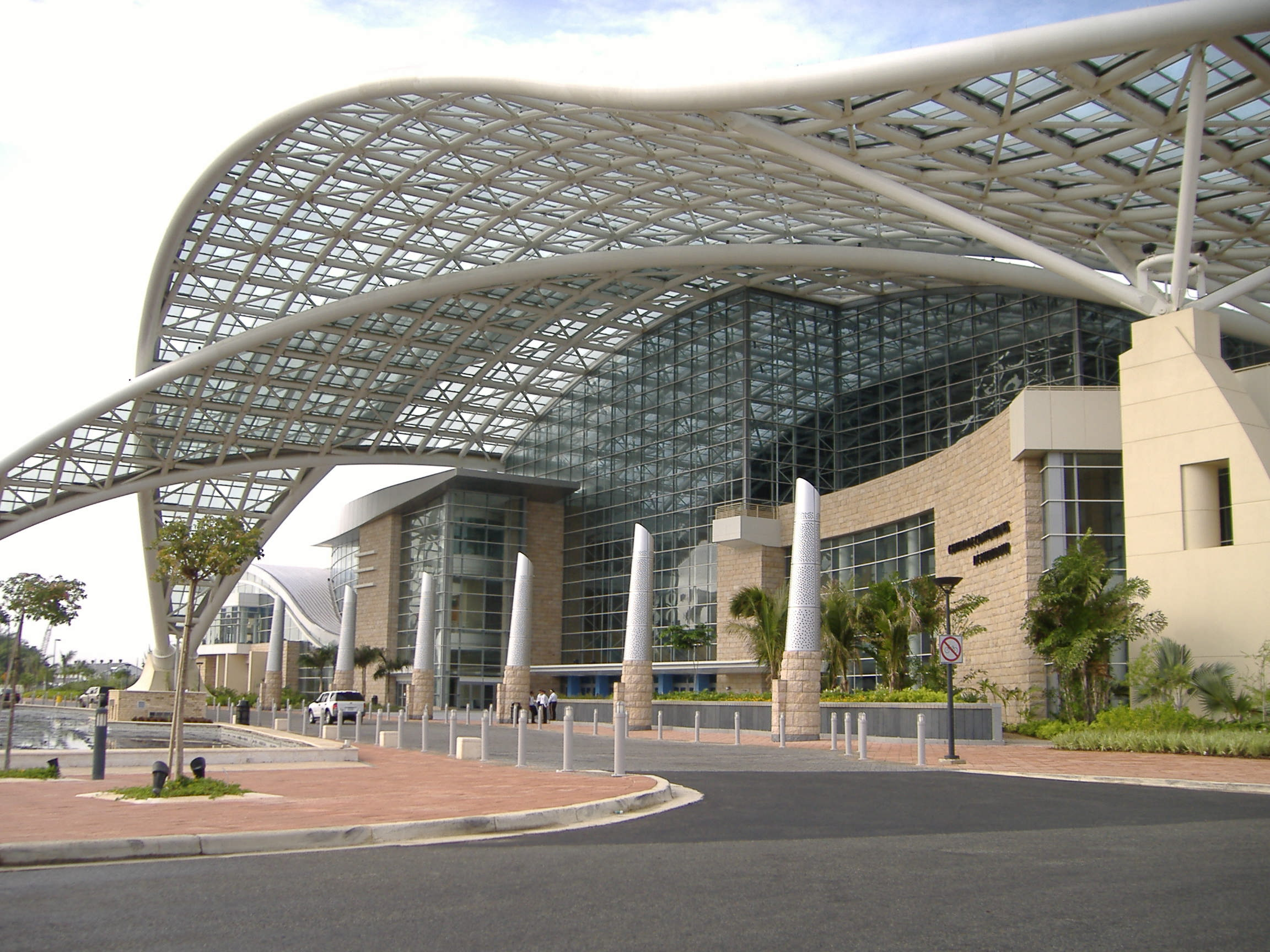
Convention Center

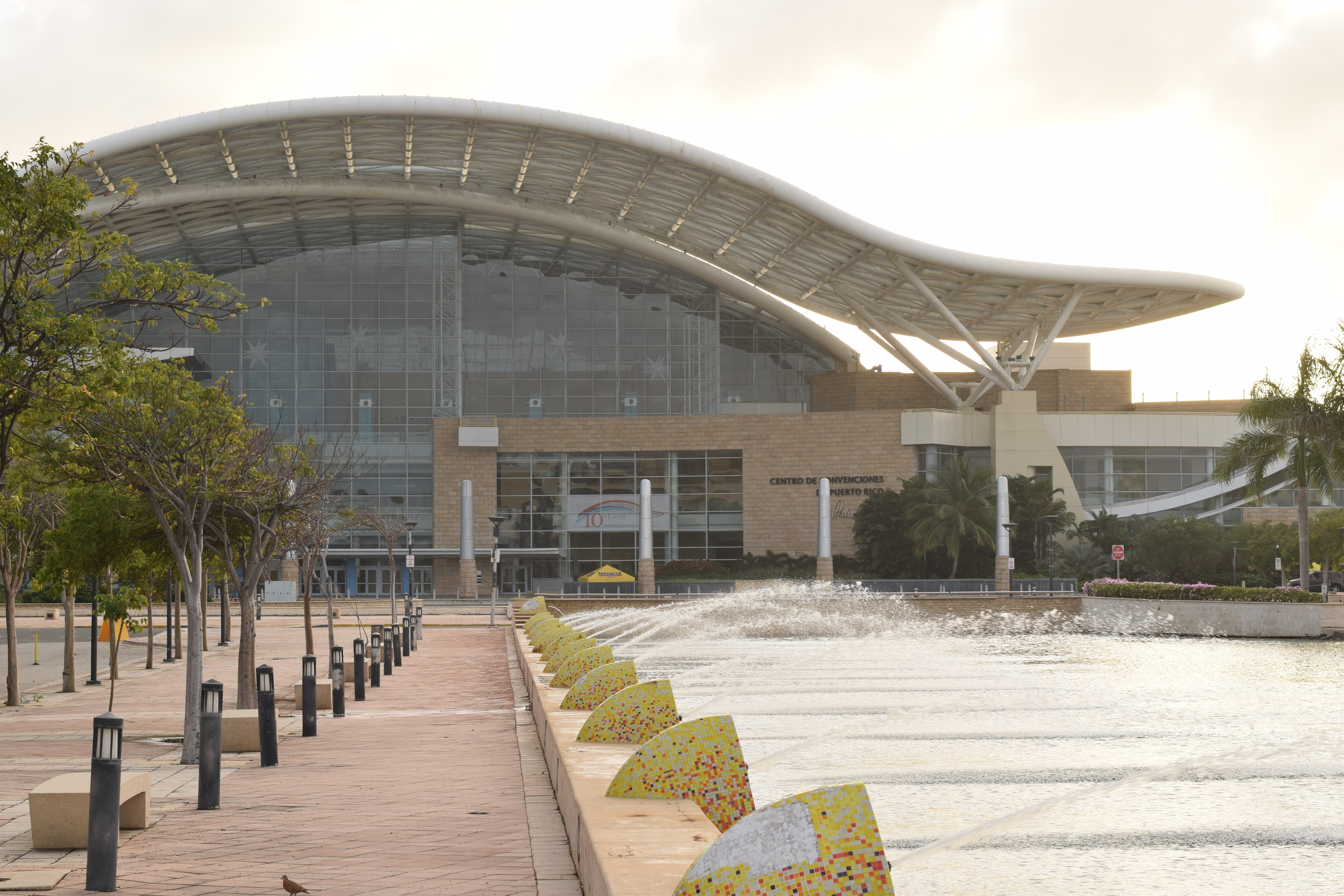
Exterior view of the Puerto Rico Convention Center

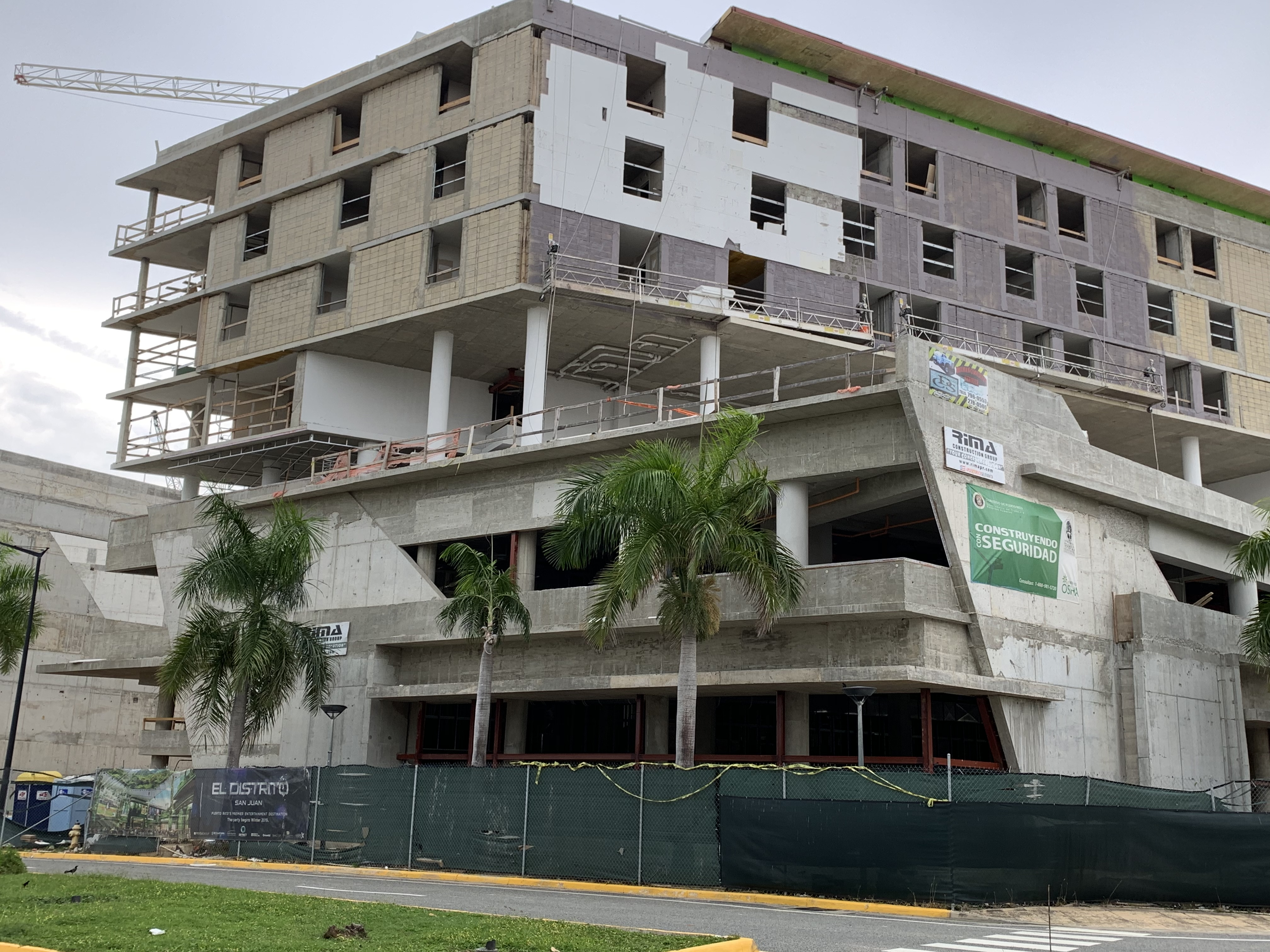
El Distrito under construction
