= 2019 FIBA 3x3 U18 World Cup =

The 2019 FIBA 3x3 U18 World Cup consists of two sections:

- 2019 FIBA 3x3 U18 World Cup – Men's tournament
- 2019 FIBA 3x3 U18 World Cup – Women's tournament
