= Isla Grande (Santurce) =

Subbarrio of Santurce in San Juan, Puerto Rico

- Subbarrio
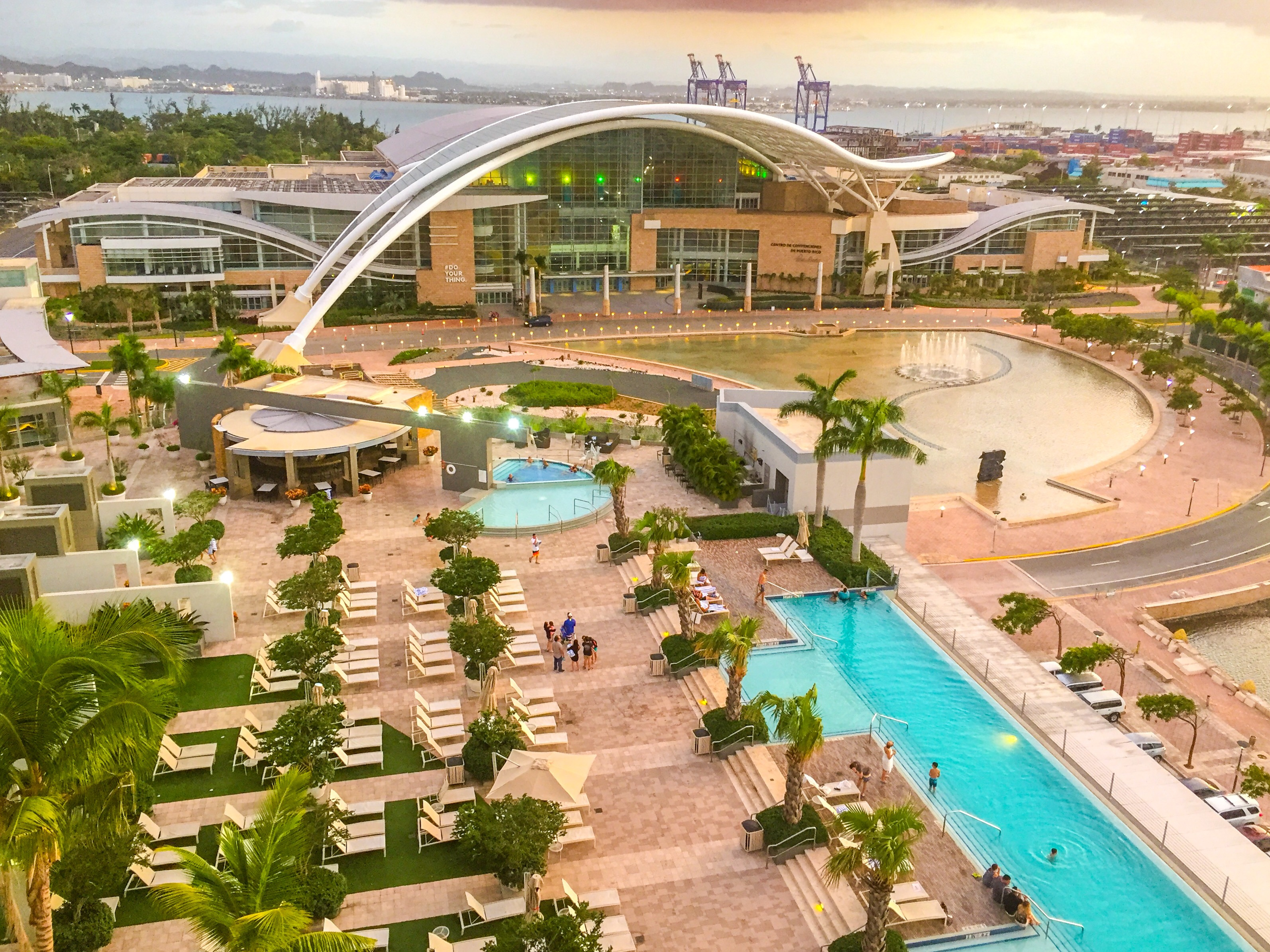
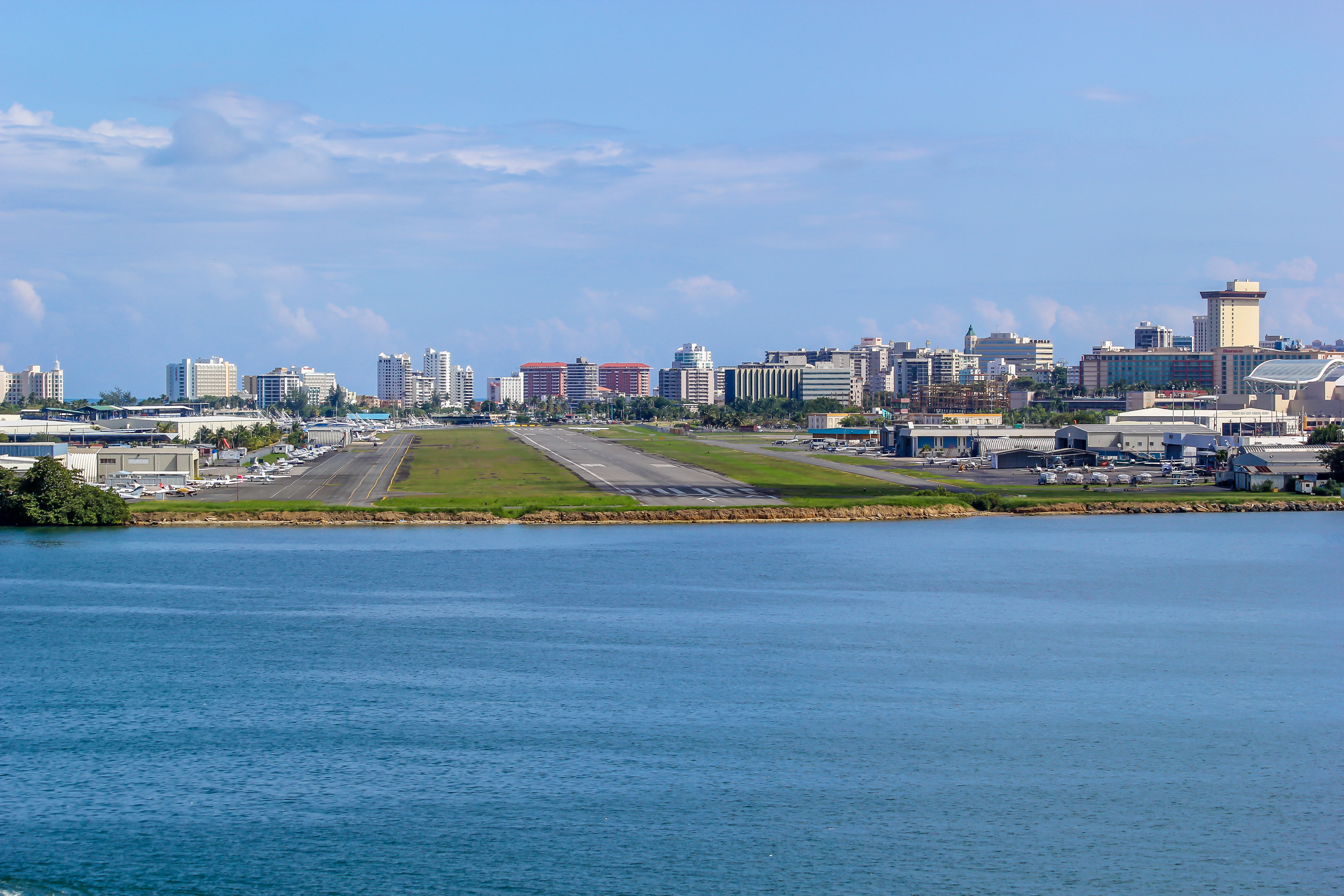
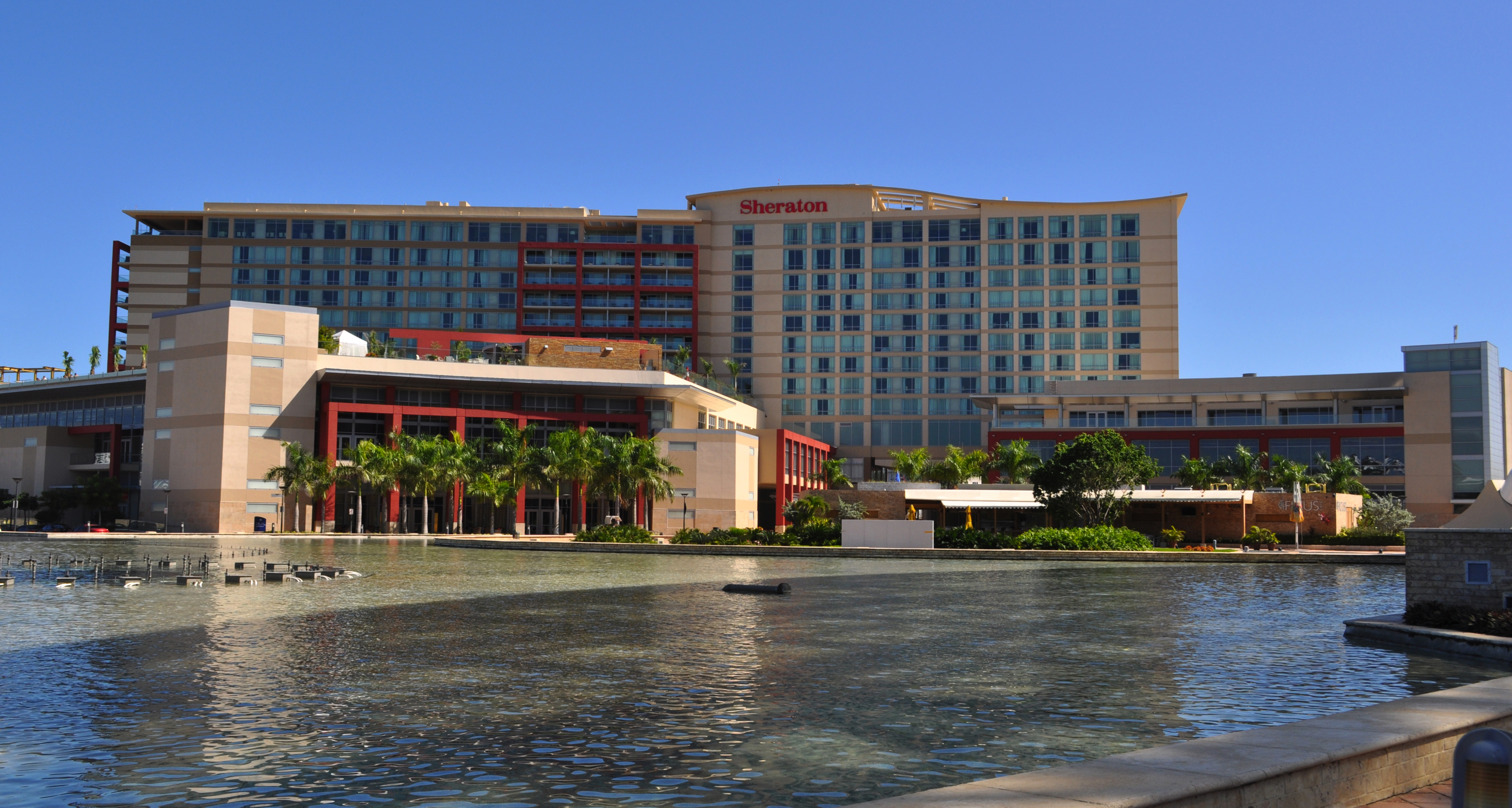
- Puerto Rico Convention Center and Distrito T-Mobile center in Isla Grande Isla Grande; Airport Sheraton Hotel in Isla Grande

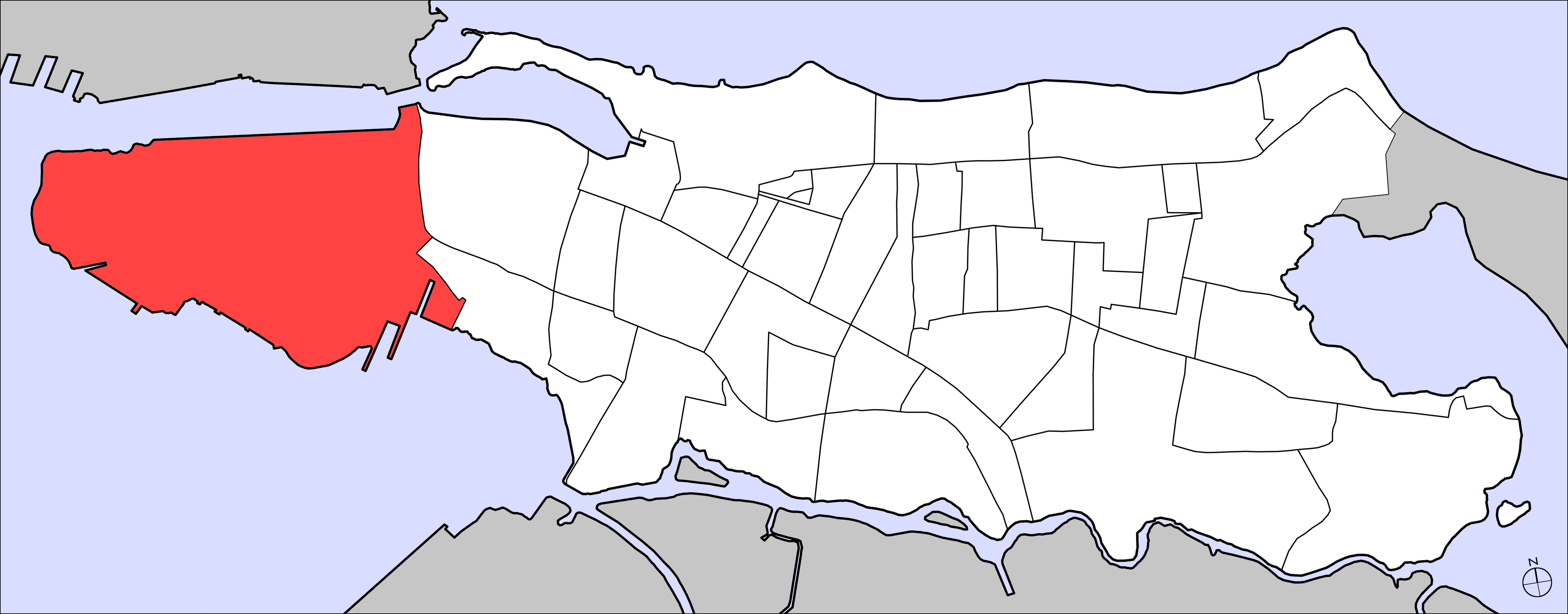
- Coordinates: 18°27′14″N 66°05′48″W
- Commonwealth: Puerto Rico
- Municipality: San Juan
- Barrio: Santurce

Area
  - Total: 1.99 sq mi (5.2 km^{2})
  - Land: 0.79 sq mi (2.0 km^{2})
  - Water: 1.20 sq mi (3.1 km^{2})
- Elevation: 10 ft (3.0 m)

Population (2010)
  - Total: 246
  - Density: 311.4/sq mi (120.2/km^{2})
- Source: 2010 Census
- Time zone: UTC−4 (AST)

Isla Grande (Spanish for ''big island'') is one of 40 subbarrios of Barrio Santurce, in San Juan, Puerto Rico.

Recently named the Convention Center District or "Distrito del Centro de Convenciones: it is bounded by Miramar, and the Condado Lagoon or Laguna del Condado. The Puerto Rico Convention Center, the Fernando Luis Ribas Dominicci Airport also commonly known as Isla Grande Airport and the International Port of San Juan are in Isla Grande.

== Demographics ==
In 1940, Isla Grande had a population of 983.

In 2010, Isla Grande had a population of 246 and a population density of 311.4 persons per square mile.

== History ==
This western section of Santurce was once a military base of the United States Navy during World War II. When it was completed in 1942 at a cost of USD30 million, the San Juan Naval Air Station, located next to the San Juan Harbor, was "the most complete and modern American base". It was home for five patrol squadrons of seaplanes, and included a defense-housing project and a major dry dock facility with shops, storehouses, fuel storage and other support centers.

== Army National Guard Aviation Support Facility ==
A U.S. Army UH-72 Lakota helicopter assigned to the Puerto Rico Army National Guard

The Puerto Rico Army National Guard (PRANG) Aviation Support Facility in Isla Verde is right next to the Fernando Luis Ribas Dominicci Airport. Its mission is to support the Puerto Rico Army National Guard Aviation Units and U.S. Army South (USARSO) operations in the caribbean. Some of the military aircraft at this facility are the UH-72 Lakota and the UH-60 Blackhawk helicopters.

== Notable properties ==
The Sheraton Hotel of Puerto Rico in Isla Grande, became the first building in the Caribbean Basin to be LEED-certified by of the U.S. Green Building Council. This building complex is distinguished for fulfilling all the requirements of a LEED certified hotel with electrical models, recycling, disposal of construction materials, and the use of local and recycled materials. The hotel also runs with environmental rules involving energy consumption, quality and filtration of air, green cleaning detergents and materials, and a controlled laundry process designed to maximize the use of natural resources.

The Puerto Rico Convention Center is a large stadium where sports events and concerts take place and was used as a staging area during Hurricane Maria relief efforts in 2017 and 2018.

The Fernando Luis Ribas Dominicci Airport of Isla Grande Airport (SIG), between the Puerto Rico Convention Center and Pan American Cruise Pier, is just southeast of Old San Juan in Isla Grande.

The Arena Medalla is slated to open in 2020.

== Gallery ==
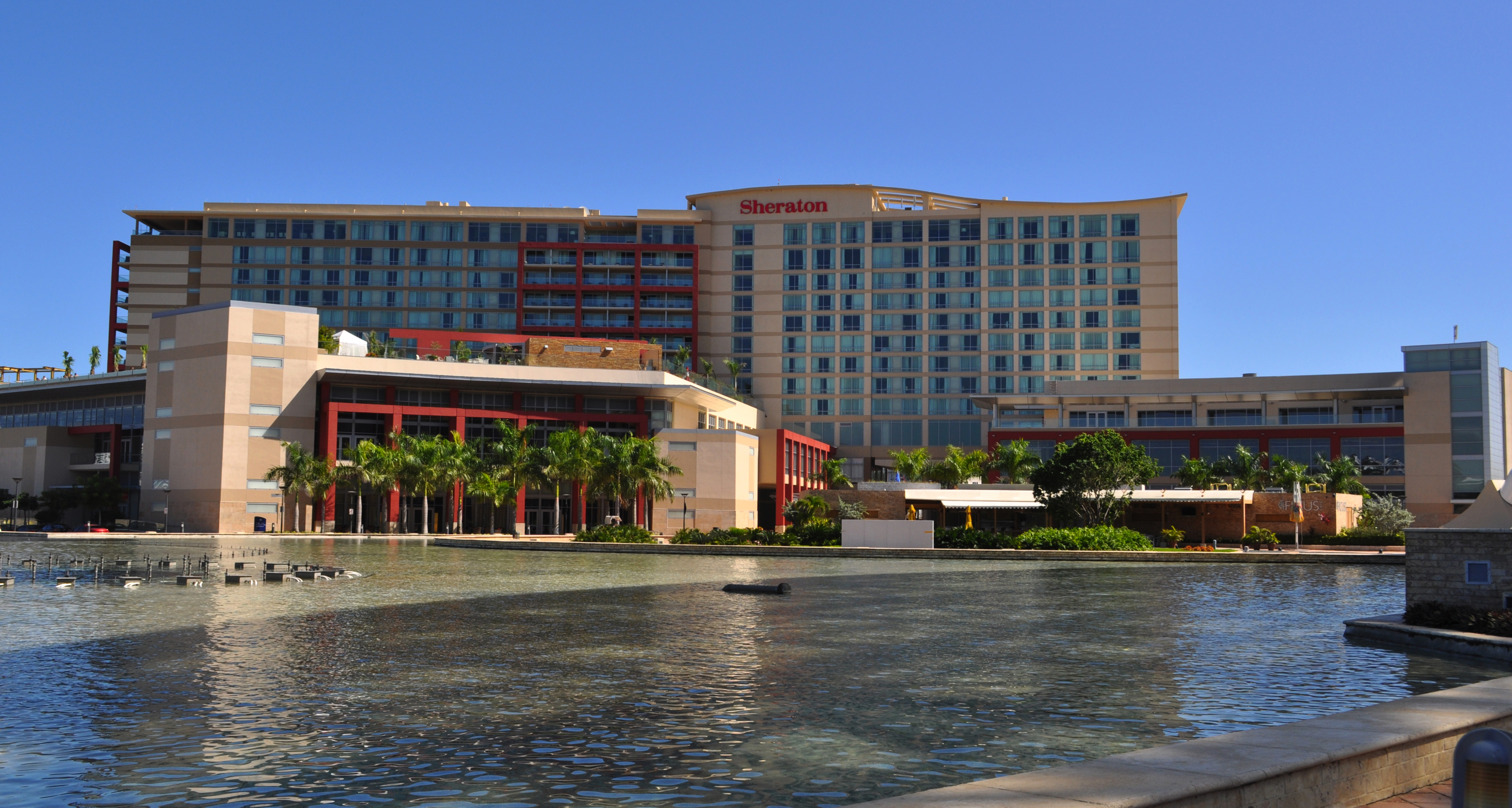
Sheraton Hotel & Casino in Isla Grande

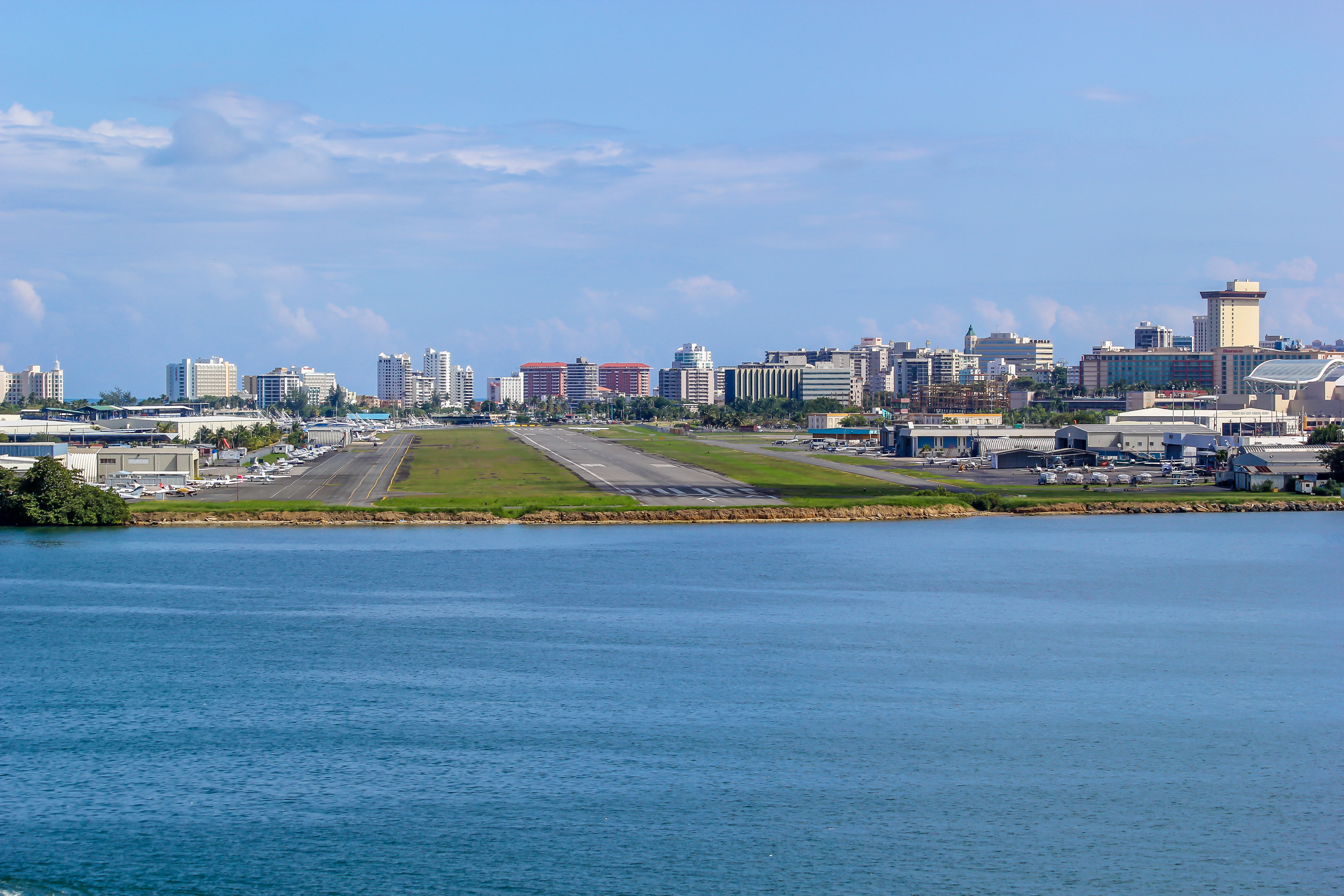
Isla Grande Airport (SIG)

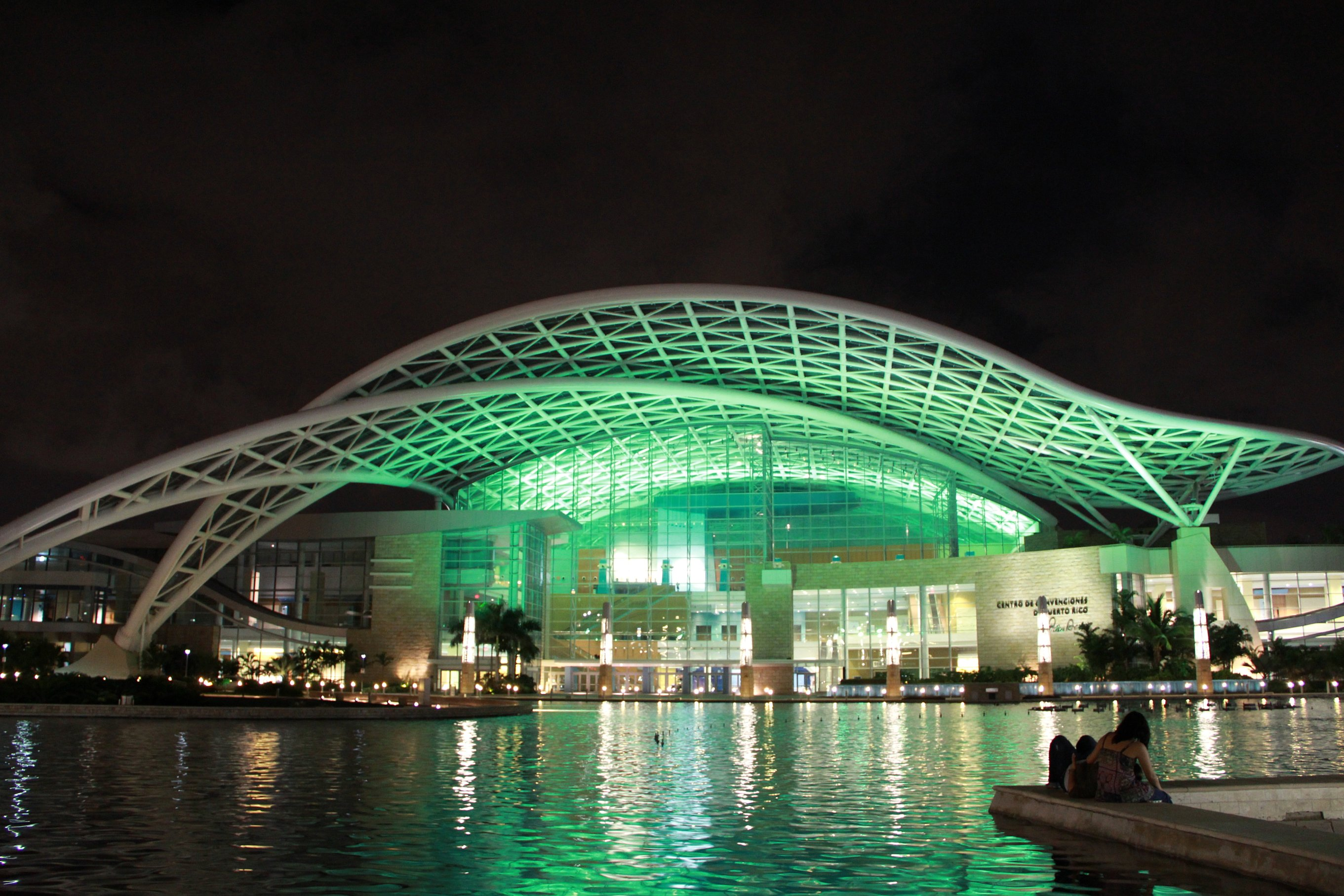
Puerto Rico Convention Center

== See also ==
- List of communities in Puerto Rico
- Port of San Juan
- San Juan Bay
