= 2023 FIBA 3x3 U17 Africa Cup – Men's tournament =

Tournament details
- Host country: Egypt
- City: Cairo
- Dates: November 30
- Teams: 5

Final positions
- Champions: Egypt (2nd title)
- Runners-up: Morocco
- Third place: Algeria
- Fourth place: Uganda

Tournament statistics
- MVP: (Egypt) Mohammed Khairy

The 2023 FIBA 3x3 U17 Africa Cup – Women's tournament is the third edition of this continental championship. The event was held in Cairo, Egypt for the second consecutive year. It was contested by 5 teams.

Egypt are the defending champions. Egypt successfully defended their crown with a win over Morocco in the final.

== Host selection ==
Egypt's capital, Cairo, was given the hosting rights on 31 May 2022.

== Participating teams ==
All African National Federations were invited to register a team for the 2023 FIBA 3x3 U17 Africa Cup.

Pool A

- Egypt (1)
- Morocco (3)
- Mali (5) (withdrew)

Pool B

- Algeria (2)
- Benin (4)
- Uganda (6)

== Preliminary round ==
The pools were announced on July 20, 2023.

=== Pool A ===
Pos	Team	Pld	W	L	PF	PA	PD	Qualification	(Egypt)	(Morocco)	(Mali)
1	Egypt (H)	1	1	0	21	15	+6	Semi-finals		21–15	Canc.
2	Morocco	1	0	1	15	21	−6	Semi-finals	15–21		Canc.
3	Mali	0	0	0	0	0	0	Withdrew	Canc.	Canc.	

Source: FIBA
Rules for classification: 1) Wins; 2) Head-to-head record; 3) Points scored.
(H) Hosts

=== Pool B ===
Pos	Team	Pld	W	L	PF	PA	PD	Qualification	(Uganda)	(Algeria)	(Benin)
1	Uganda	2	2	0	37	29	+8	Semi-finals			
2	Algeria	2	1	1	35	28	+7	Semi-finals	18–20 OT		
3	Benin	2	0	2	19	34	−15		11–17	8–17	

Source: FIBA
Rules for classification: 1) Wins; 2) Head-to-head record; 3) Points scored.

== Knockout stage ==
All times are local.

Semi-finals
30 Nov 2023 – 18:00
Egypt	18
Algeria	8
30 Nov 2023 – 18:25
Uganda	10
Morocco	18

Final
30 Nov 2023 – 20:15
Egypt	17
Morocco	11
Bronze medal
30 Nov 2023 – 19:25
Algeria	20
Uganda	13

== Final standings ==
Pos	Team	Pld	W	L	PF	PA	PD
1	Egypt	3	3	0	60	32	+28
2	Morocco	3	1	2	42	52	–10
3	Algeria	4	2	2	63	59	+4
4	Uganda	4	2	2	60	67	–7
5	Benin	2	0	2	19	34	–15

== Awards ==
These players were given the awards after the competition:

=== Most valuable player ===
- (Egypt) Mohammed Khairy

=== Top scorer ===
- (Algeria) Amine Belal Belkorchia (31 points)

=== Team of the tournament ===
- (Egypt) Mohammed Khairy
- (Algeria) Amine Belal Belkorchia
- (Morocco) Mohammed Regragui

== See also ==
- 2023 FIBA 3x3 U17 Africa Cup – Women's tournament
- 2023 FIBA 3x3 World Cup – Men's tournament
- 2023 FIBA 3x3 World Cup – Women's tournament
- 2023 FIBA 3x3 U18 World Cup – Men's tournament
- 2023 FIBA 3x3 U18 World Cup – Women's tournament
- 2023 FIBA 3x3 Africa Cup – Men's tournament
- 2023 FIBA 3x3 Africa Cup – Women's tournament
- 2023 FIBA 3x3 Asia Cup
- 2023 FIBA 3x3 AmeriCup – Men's tournament
- 2023 FIBA 3x3 AmeriCup – Women's tournament
- 2023 FIBA 3x3 Europe Cup
