= 2016 FIBA 3x3 Under-18 World Championships – Men's tournament =

2016 FIBA 3x3 Under-18 World Championships Men's tournament
Tournament information
- Date: June 1–5
- Host(s): Kazakhstan
- Teams: 20

Final positions
- Champions: Qatar
- 1st runners-up: Brazil
- 2nd runners-up: Italy

The Men's Tournament of the 2016 FIBA 3x3 Under-18 World Championships hosted in Kazakhstan was contested by 20 teams.

== Participating teams ==
All five FIBA zones were represented. The top 20 teams, including the hosts, based on the FIBA National Federation ranking qualified for the tournament.

FIBA Asia (5)

- China (7)
- Indonesia (6)
- Kazakhstan (19) (hosts)
- Philippines (13)
- Qatar (14)

FIBA Africa (1)

- Egypt (17)

FIBA Oceania (1)

- New Zealand (12)

FIBA Americas (3)

- Argentina (15)
- Brazil (5)
- Uruguay (8)

FIBA Europe (10)

- Andorra (10)
- Belgium (16)
- Georgia (18)
- Hungary (4)
- Italy (11)
- Netherlands (1)
- Romania (3)
- Slovenia (9)
- Spain (20)
- Turkey (2)

== Main tournament ==
=== Preliminary round ===
==== Group A ====
Team	Pld	W	L	PF	PA	PD	Pts
Slovenia	4	3	1	70	51	+19	7
Uruguay	4	3	1	69	54	+15	7
Netherlands	4	2	2	53	55	−2	6
Belgium	4	2	2	64	59	+5	6
Egypt	4	0	4	37	74	−37	4

Pts Ave
17.5
17.2
13.2
16.0
9.2

(Slovenia)	(Uruguay)	(Belgium)	(Netherlands)	(Egypt)
—	14–10	18–14	16–18	22–9
10–14	—	18–14	19–13	22–13
14–18	14–18	—	15–13	10–6
18–16	13–19	13–15	—	20–9
9–22	13–22	6–10	9–20	—

==== Group B ====
Team	Pld	W	L	PF	PA	PD	Pts
Argentina	4	4	0	73	46	+27	8
Georgia	4	3	1	65	49	+16	7
Andorra	4	1	3	60	67	−7	5
China	4	1	3	59	80	−21	5
Turkey	4	1	3	53	68	−15	5

Pts Ave
18.2
16.2
15.0
14.8
13.2

(Argentina)	(Georgia (country))	(Andorra)	(China)	(Turkey)
—	18–14	19–10	21–17	15–5
14–18	—	17–12	19–8	15–11
10–19	12–17	—	21–13	17–18
17–21	8–19	13–21	—	21–19
5–15	11–15	18–17	19–21	—

==== Group C ====
Team	Pld	W	L	PF	PA	PD	Pts
Italy	4	4	0	82	47	+35	8
Qatar	4	3	1	73	58	+15	7
Kazakhstan	4	2	2	55	64	−9	6
Indonesia	4	1	3	57	61	−4	5
Romania	4	0	4	47	74	−27	4

Pts Ave
21.0
19.0
14.0
13.5
11.8

(Italy)	(Qatar)	(Kazakhstan)	(Indonesia)	(Romania)
—	20–17	19–14	22–9	21–7
17–20	—	21–9	19–16	16–13
14–19	9–21	—	15–12	17–12
9–22	16–19	12–15	—	20–15
7–21	13–16	12–17	15–20	—

==== Group D ====
Team	Pld	W	L	PF	PA	PD	Pts
New Zealand	4	4	0	84	49	+35	8
Brazil	4	2	2	54	64	−10	6
Spain	4	2	2	70	69	+1	6
Philippines	4	1	3	57	74	−17	5
Hungary	4	1	3	58	67	−9	5

Pts Ave
21.0
13.5
17.5
14.2
14.5

(New Zealand)	(Brazil)	(Spain)	(Philippines)	(Hungary)
—	21–8	22–17	21–11	21–13
8–21	—	19–16	20–14	7–13
17–21	16–19	—	16–14	21–15
11–21	14–20	14–16	—	18–17
13–21	13–7	15–21	17–18	—

=== Knock out Stage ===
Quarter-finals
5 June
Slovenia	13
Brazil	19
5 June
Italy	17
Georgia	14
5 June
Argentina	18
Qatar	21
5 June
New Zealand	16
Uruguay	15

Semi-finals
5 June
Brazil	21
Italy	20
5 June
Qatar	21
New Zealand	16

Final
5 June
Brazil	12
Qatar	20
3rd Place
5 June
Italy	21
New Zealand	14
