= 2022 FIBA 3x3 U17 Africa Cup – Men's tournament =

Basketball competition in Egypt

Tournament details
- Host country: Egypt
- City: Cairo
- Dates: December 1–2
- Teams: 7

Final positions
- Champions: Egypt (2nd title)
- Runners-up: DR Congo
- Third place: Morocco
- Fourth place: Algeria

Tournament statistics
- MVP: (Egypt) Ramy Basha

The 2022 FIBA 3x3 U17 Africa Cup – Men's tournament is the second edition of this continental championship. The event was held in Cairo, Egypt. It was contested by 7 teams. Starting this edition, the age group changed from U18 to U17.

Egypt won their second title with a win over Congo DR in the final.

== Host selection ==
Egypt's capital, Cairo, was given the hosting rights on 31 May 2022.

== Participating teams ==
All African National Federations were invited to register a team for the 2022 FIBA 3x3 U17 Africa Cup.

Pool A

- Egypt (1)
- Algeria (4)
- Morocco (5)
- Zambia (8)

Pool B

- Benin (2)
- (Democratic Republic of the Congo) Congo DR (3)
- Kenya (6)
- Rwanda (7) (withdrew)

== Preliminary round ==
The pools were announced on October 3, 2022.

=== Pool A ===
Pos	Team	Pld	W	L	PF	PA	PD	Qualification	(Egypt)	(Morocco)	(Algeria)	(Zambia)
1	Egypt (H)	3	3	0	63	32	+31	Semi-finals			21–12	21–6
2	Morocco	3	2	1	56	49	+7	Quarter-finals	14–21			
3	Algeria	3	1	2	50	54	−4	Quarter-finals		17–20		21–13
4	Zambia	3	0	3	30	64	−34			11–22		

Source: FIBA
Rules for classification: 1) Wins; 2) Head-to-head record; 3) Points scored.
(H) Hosts

=== Pool B ===
Pos	Team	Pld	W	L	PF	PA	PD	Qualification	(Democratic Republic of the Congo)	(Kenya)	(Benin)	(Rwanda)
1	(Democratic Republic of the Congo) Congo DR	2	2	0	36	21	+15	Semi-finals		21–12		Canc.
2	Kenya	2	1	1	27	34	−7	Quarter-finals			15–13	Canc.
3	Benin	2	0	2	22	30	−8	Quarter-finals	9–15			Canc.
4	Rwanda	0	0	0	0	0	0	Withdrew	Canc.	Canc.	Canc.	

Source: FIBA
Rules for classification: 1) Wins; 2) Head-to-head record; 3) Points scored.

== Knockout stage ==
All times are local.

Quarter-finals
2 Dec 2022 – 15:25
Kenya	11
Algeria	19
2 Dec 2022 – 15:50
Morocco	19
Benin	12

Semi-finals
2 Dec 2022 – 17:15
Egypt	19
Algeria	10
2 Dec 2022 – 17:40
(Democratic Republic of the Congo) Congo DR	21
Morocco	15

Final
2 Dec 2022 – 19:30
Egypt	20
(Democratic Republic of the Congo) Congo DR	17
Bronze medal
2 Dec 2022 – 18:40
Algeria	15
Morocco	21

== Final standings ==
Pos	Team	Pld	W	L	PF	PA	PD
1	Egypt	5	5	0	102	59	+43
2	(Democratic Republic of the Congo) Congo DR	6	3	3	74	56	+18
3	Morocco	5	4	1	111	97	+14
4	Algeria	6	2	4	94	105	–11
5	Kenya	4	2	2	38	43	–5
6	Benin	4	1	3	34	49	–15
7	Zambia	3	0	3	30	64	–9

== Awards ==
These players were given the awards after the competition:

=== Most valuable player ===
- (Egypt) Bahaa Ramadan

=== Top scorer ===
- (Morocco) Rami Younous (49 points)

=== Team of the tournament ===
- (Egypt) Ramy Basha
- (Democratic Republic of the Congo) David Akim
- (Morocco) Rami Younous

== See also ==
- 2022 FIBA 3x3 U17 Africa Cup – Women's tournament
- 2022 FIBA 3x3 World Cup – Men's tournament
- 2022 FIBA 3x3 World Cup – Women's tournament
- 2022 FIBA 3x3 Africa Cup
- 2022 FIBA 3x3 Asia Cup
- 2022 FIBA 3x3 AmeriCup
- 2022 FIBA 3x3 Europe Cup
