= 2019 FIBA 3x3 U18 Africa Cup =

FIBA 3x3 U18 Africa Cup

The 2019 FIBA 3x3 U18 Africa Cup is the inaugural edition of the FIBA 3x3 U18 Africa Cup. It is the first-ever U18 national team competition for 3x3 in Africa. The game took place at the Lugogo Hockey Pitch in Kampala, Uganda on November 8-10. Eight men's and eight women's teams participated.

== Format ==
Eight teams were divided into two pools of four teams, then top two teams from each pool advanced to the knockout stage.

== Men's tournament ==
=== Pool stage ===
==== Pool A ====
Pos	Team	Pld	W	L	PF	PA	PD	PCT	Qualification	(Egypt)	(Mali)	(Kenya)	(Botswana)
1	Egypt	3	3	0	55	21	+34	1.000	Knockout stage	—	13–9	21–5	21–7
2	Mali	3	2	1	49	27	+22	.667	Knockout stage		—	21–7	19–7
3	Kenya	3	1	2	24	51	−27	.333				—	12–9
4	Botswana	3	0	3	23	52	−29	.000					—

Source: FIBA
Rules for classification: 1) Wins; 2) Head-to-head record; 3) Points scored; 4) Higher seed.

==== Pool B ====
Pos	Team	Pld	W	L	PF	PA	PD	PCT	Qualification	(Nigeria)	(Uganda)	(Niger)	(Burundi)
1	Nigeria	3	3	0	57	25	+32	1.000	Knockout stage	—	21–7	19–10	17–8
2	Uganda	3	2	1	41	42	−1	.667	Knockout stage		—	21–13	13–8
3	Niger	3	1	2	35	50	−15	.333				—	12–10
4	Burundi	3	0	3	26	42	−16	.000					—

Source: FIBA
Rules for classification: 1) Wins; 2) Head-to-head record; 3) Points scored; 4) Higher seed.

=== Knockout stage ===
All times are local.

Semi-finals
10 Nov 2019 – 17:55
Egypt	21
Uganda	15
10 Nov 2019 – 18:15
Nigeria	19
Mali	21

Final
10 Nov 2019 – 20:05
Egypt	14
Mali	13
Bronze medal
10 Nov 2019 – 19:10
Nigeria	12
Uganda	17

=== Final standings ===
Pos	Team	Pld	W	L	PF
1	Egypt	5	5	0	90
2	Mali	5	3	2	83
3	Uganda	5	3	2	73
4	Nigeria	5	3	2	88
5	Niger	3	1	2	35
6	Kenya	3	1	2	24
7	Burundi	3	0	3	26
8	Botswana	3	0	3	23

== Women's tournament ==
=== Pool stage ===
==== Pool A ====
Pos	Team	Pld	W	L	PF	PA	PD	PCT	Qualification	(Mali)	(Nigeria)	(Egypt)	(Kenya)
1	Mali	3	3	0	40	22	+18	1.000	Knockout stage	—	12–9	8–6	20–7
2	Nigeria	3	2	1	44	29	+15	.667	Knockout stage		—	15–8	20–9
3	Egypt	3	1	2	31	25	+6	.333				—	17–2
4	Kenya	3	0	3	18	57	−39	.000					—

Source: FIBA
Rules for classification: 1) Wins; 2) Head-to-head record; 3) Points scored; 4) Higher seed.

==== Pool B ====
Pos	Team	Pld	W	L	PF	PA	PD	PCT	Qualification	(Uganda)	(Democratic Republic of the Congo)	(Botswana)	(Burundi)
1	Uganda	3	3	0	53	22	+31	1.000	Knockout stage	—	15–13	17–6	21–3
2	DR Congo	3	2	1	45	25	+20	.667	Knockout stage		—	14–9	18–1
3	Botswana	3	1	2	31	40	−9	.333				—	16–9
4	Burundi	3	0	3	13	55	−42	.000					—

Source: FIBA
Rules for classification: 1) Wins; 2) Head-to-head record; 3) Points scored; 4) Higher seed.

=== Knockout stage ===
All times are local.

Semi-finals
10 Nov 2019 – 17:15
Uganda	13
Nigeria	9
10 Nov 2019 – 17:35
Mali	22
DR Congo	3

Final
10 Nov 2019 – 19:40
Mali	17
Uganda	4
Bronze medal
10 Nov 2019 – 18:50
Nigeria	8
DR Congo	6

=== Final standings ===
Pos	Team	Pld	W	L	PF
1	Mali	5	5	0	79
2	Uganda	5	4	1	70
3	Nigeria	5	3	2	61
4	DR Congo	5	2	3	54
5	Egypt	3	1	2	31
6	Botswana	3	1	2	31
7	Kenya	3	0	3	18
8	Burundi	3	0	3	13

== Shoot-out contest ==
=== Format ===
One player from each men's and women's team participates. In the qualifier, each participant try ten shots from the top of the key (45 degrees angle with two racks) within 30 seconds. Top two men and two women players advance to the final. In the final stage, the four players try 18 shots within 60 seconds from four locations: five from the top of the arc, ten from the left and right wings (45 degrees), and three from the 3x3 logo which is counted as two points.

=== Awards ===
- Gold: Alou Traore (Mali's men)
- Silver: Claris Osula (Kenya's women)
- Bronze: Mustapha Oyebanji (Nigeria's men)
