= 2023 FIBA 3x3 AmeriCup – Women's tournament =

Tournament details
- Host country: Puerto Rico
- City: San Juan
- Dates: 30 November–3 December
- Teams: 15
- Venue: Distrito T-Mobile

Final positions
- Champions: United States (2nd title)
- Runners-up: Brazil
- Third place: Canada
- Fourth place: Chile

Tournament statistics
- MVP: (United States) Dearica Hamby

The 2023 FIBA 3x3 AmeriCup – Women's tournament is the third edition of this continental championship. The event was held in San Juan, Puerto Rico. It was contested by 15 teams.

The United States won their second title, after defeated Brazil with the final score of 21–20.

== Host selection ==
The Trailer and branding in 2023 FIBA 3x3 AmeriCup

Puerto Rico's capital, San Juan, was given the hosting rights on 20 January 2023.

== Participating teams ==
All National Federations in the Americas region were invited to register a team for the 2023 FIBA 3x3 AmeriCup.

Preliminary round

Pool A

- United States (1)
- Dominican Republic (7)
- Uruguay (8)

Pool B

- Canada (2)
- Brazil (6)
- Qualifier B

Pool C

- Chile (3)
- Argentina (5)
- Qualifier A

Pool D

- Puerto Rico (4)
- Qualifier A
- Qualifier B

Qualifying draw

Pool A

- Mexico (9)
- Guatemala (12)
- Ecuador (13)

Pool B

- Colombia (10)
- Jamaica (11)
- Nicaragua (14)
- Cayman Islands (15)

== Qualifying draw ==
The top two from each group qualifies for the next round.

=== Pool A ===
Pos	Team	Pld	W	L	PF	PA	PD	Qualification	(Mexico)	(Ecuador)	(Guatemala)
1	Mexico	2	2	0	29	19	+10	Preliminary round		13–5	16–14
2	Ecuador	2	1	1	21	23	−2	Preliminary round			
3	Guatemala	2	0	2	24	32	−8			10–16	

Source: FIBA
Rules for classification: 1) Wins; 2) Head-to-head record; 3) Points scored.

=== Pool B ===
Pos	Team	Pld	W	L	PF	PA	PD	Qualification	(Colombia)	(Jamaica)	(Nicaragua)	(Cayman Islands)
1	Colombia	3	3	0	63	25	+38	Preliminary round		21–14		21–6
2	Jamaica	3	2	1	57	25	+32	Preliminary round			21–1	22–3
3	Nicaragua	3	1	2	25	51	−26		5–21			
4	Cayman Islands	3	0	3	18	62	−44				9–19	

Source: FIBA
Rules for classification: 1) Wins; 2) Head-to-head record; 3) Points scored.

== Preliminary round ==
=== Pool A ===
Pos	Team	Pld	W	L	PF	PA	PD	Qualification	(United States)	(Dominican Republic)	(Uruguay)
1	United States	2	2	0	38	22	+16	quarter-finals		21–10	17–12
2	Dominican Republic	2	1	1	28	38	−10	quarter-finals			18–17
3	Uruguay	2	0	2	29	35	−6				

Source: FIBA
Rules for classification: 1) Wins; 2) Head-to-head record; 3) Points scored.

=== Pool B ===
Pos	Team	Pld	W	L	PF	PA	PD	Qualification	(Brazil)	(Canada)	(Colombia)
1	Brazil	2	2	0	34	27	+7	quarter-finals			19–13
2	Canada	2	1	1	26	25	+1	quarter-finals	14–15 OT		12–10
3	Colombia	2	0	2	23	31	−8				

Source: FIBA
Rules for classification: 1) Wins; 2) Head-to-head record; 3) Points scored.

=== Pool C ===
Pos	Team	Pld	W	L	PF	PA	PD	Qualification	(Chile)	(Ecuador)	(Argentina)
1	Chile	2	1	1	32	18	+14	quarter-finals		11–12	21–6
2	Ecuador	2	1	1	21	25	−4	quarter-finals			
3	Argentina	2	1	1	20	30	−10			14–9	

Source: FIBA
Rules for classification: 1) Wins; 2) Head-to-head record; 3) Points scored.

=== Pool D ===
Pos	Team	Pld	W	L	PF	PA	PD	Qualification	(Puerto Rico)	(Jamaica)	(Mexico)
1	Puerto Rico (H)	2	2	0	32	27	+5	quarter-finals		16–14 OT	16–13
2	Jamaica	2	1	1	30	30	0	quarter-finals			
3	Mexico	2	0	2	27	32	−5			14–16	

Source: FIBA
Rules for classification: 1) Wins; 2) Head-to-head record; 3) Points scored.
(H) Hosts

== Knockout stage ==
All times are local.

Quarter-finals
3 Dec 2023 – 14:50
United States	18
Ecuador	7
3 Dec 2023 – 14:25
Puerto Rico	13
Canada	17
3 Dec 2023 – 16:15
Brazil	18
Jamaica	15
3 Dec 2023 – 16:40
Chile	17
Dominican Republic	12

Semi-finals
3 Dec 2023 – 18:05
United States	21
Canada	15
3 Dec 2023 – 18:30
Brazil	18
Chile	14

Final
3 Dec 2023 – 20:55
United States	21
Brazil	20
Bronze medal
3 Dec 2023 – 19:55
Canada	21
Chile	8

== Final standings ==
Pos	Team	Pld	W	L	PF	PA	PD
1	United States	5	5	0	98	64	+34
2	Brazil	5	4	1	90	77	+13
3	Canada	5	3	2	79	67	+12
4	Chile	5	2	3	71	69	+2
5	Puerto Rico	3	2	1	45	44	+1
6	Jamaica	6	3	3	102	73	+29
7	Dominican Republic	3	1	2	40	55	–15
8	Ecuador	5	2	3	49	66	–17
9	Argentina	2	1	1	20	30	–10
10	Uruguay	2	0	2	29	35	–6
11	Mexico	4	2	2	56	51	+5
12	Colombia	5	3	2	86	56	+30
13	Nicaragua	3	1	2	25	51	–26
14	Guatemala	2	0	2	24	32	–8
15	Cayman Islands	3	0	3	18	62	–44

== Awards ==
These players were given the awards after the competition:

=== Most valuable player ===
- (United States) Dearica Hamby

=== Top scorer ===
- (Brazil) Vitoria Marcelino (42 points)

=== Team of the tournament ===
- (United States) Dearica Hamby
- (Brazil) Vitoria Marcelino
- (Canada) Paige Crozon

== See also ==
- 2023 FIBA 3x3 World Cup – Men's tournament
- 2023 FIBA 3x3 World Cup – Women's tournament
- 2023 FIBA 3x3 AmeriCup – Men's tournament
- 2023 FIBA 3x3 U18 World Cup – Men's tournament
- 2023 FIBA 3x3 U18 World Cup – Women's tournament
- 2023 FIBA 3x3 Africa Cup – Men's tournament
- 2023 FIBA 3x3 Africa Cup – Women's tournament
- 2023 FIBA 3x3 U17 Africa Cup – Men's tournament
- 2023 FIBA 3x3 U17 Africa Cup – Women's tournament
- 2023 FIBA 3x3 Asia Cup
- 2023 FIBA 3x3 Europe Cup
