= Basketball at the 2023 Pan American Games – Women's 3x3 tournament =

Women's 3x3 basketball at the 2023 Pan American Games
- Venue: South Sports Centre
- Dates: October 21–23, 2023
- Competitors: 48 from 12 nations

Medalists
Gold medal	United States (2nd title)
Silver medal	Colombia
Bronze medal	Chile

The women's 3x3 basketball tournament at the 2023 Pan American Games in Santiago, Chile is being held from 21 and 23 October 2023.

== Qualification ==
Event	Dates	Location	Quota(s)	Qualified
Host Nation	—N/a	—N/a	1	Chile
2021 Junior Pan American Games	November 28–30	(Colombia) Cali	1	Colombia
2022 FIBA 3x3 AmeriCup	November 4–6	(United States) Miami	4	~~Canada~~; Brazil; United States; Jamaica
FIBA 3x3 Rankings	June 30, 2023	—N/a	6	Puerto Rico; Venezuela; Argentina; Dominican Republic; Uruguay; El Salvador; Mexico
Total			12	

== Rosters ==
Team	Players			
Argentina	Delfina Gentinetta	Natacha Pérez	Ornella Santana	Aylen Valdez
Brazil	Luana Batista	Vitoria Domingos	Kawanni Silva	Lays da Silva
Chile	Jovanka Ljubetic	Ziomara Morrison	Javiera Novión	Fernanda Ovalle
Colombia	Wendy Coy	Carolina López	Valentina López	Jenifer Muñoz
Dominican Republic	Yenifer Jimenez	Maria Marte	Nayely Morillo	Yadira Polanco
El Salvador	Paola Campos	Camila Lima	Adriana Rivas	Laura Rivas
Jamaica	Faatimah A	Jessica Fairweather	Tashawna Higgins	Crystal Primm
Mexico	Karina Esquer	Deyna Alicia Gonzalez	Alejandra Rovira	Miranda Zamora
Puerto Rico	Paola Maldonado	Marie Plácido	Ashley Torres	Annelisse Vargas
United States	Cierra Burdick	Blake Dietrick	Lexie Hull	Azurá Stevens
Uruguay	Lucia Auza	Natasha Dolinsky	Lucia Schiavo	Josefina Zeballos
Venezuela	Bárbara Pico	Leudys Quevedo	Vanessa Sanchez	Luisanny Zapata

== Preliminary round ==
=== Group A ===
Pos	Team	Pld	W	L	PF	PA	PD	Qualification
1	United States	2	2	0	43	20	+23	Quarterfinals
2	Mexico	2	1	1	28	33	−5	Quarterfinals
3	Dominican Republic	2	0	2	23	41	−18	

Source: Report
Rules for classification: 1) Wins; 2) Head-to-head record; 3) Points scored.

21 October 2023
14:00

Report

Mexico	19–12	Dominican Republic
Pts: Esquer, Rovira 7		Pts: Polanco 6

Estadio Español Las Condes, Santiago
Referees: Lautaro Ojeda (ARG), Yilizeth Vence (COL)

21 October 2023
18:00

Report

United States	22–11	Dominican Republic
Pts: Stevens 10		Pts: Jiménez 5

Estadio Español Las Condes, Santiago
Referees: María Olivieri (ARG), Yilzeth Vence (COL)

22 October 2023
13:00

Report

United States	22–9	Mexico
Pts: Stevens 7		Pts: Rovira 4

Estadio Español Las Condes, Santiago
Referees: Marie Houlie (CAN), Ana Zachi (BRA)

=== Group B ===
Pos	Team	Pld	W	L	PF	PA	PD	Qualification
1	Colombia	2	2	0	38	17	+21	Quarterfinals
2	Chile (H)	2	1	1	34	25	+9	Quarterfinals
3	El Salvador	2	0	2	8	38	−30	

Source: Report
Rules for classification: 1) Wins; 2) Head-to-head record; 3) Points scored.
(H) Hosts

21 October 2023
14:30

Report

El Salvador	4–17	Colombia
Pts: Rivas 3		Pts: López 5

Estadio Español Las Condes, Santiago
Referees: Nicolás Sarli (URU), Ana Zachi (BRA)

21 October 2023
18:30

Report

Chile	13–21	Colombia
Pts: Ljubetic, Morrison 5		Pts: Muñoz 9

Estadio Español Las Condes, Santiago
Referees: Sonia Maldonado (PUR), Nicolás Sarli (URU)

22 October 2023
13:30

Report

Chile	21–4	El Salvador
Pts: Ovalle 9		Pts: Lima, Rivas 2

Estadio Español Las Condes, Santiago
Referees: Nicolás Sarli (URU), Lautaro Ojeda (ARG)

=== Group C ===
Pos	Team	Pld	W	L	PF	PA	PD	Qualification
1	Puerto Rico	2	2	0	44	22	+22	Quarterfinals
2	Venezuela	2	1	1	32	39	−7	Quarterfinals
3	Jamaica	2	0	2	28	43	−15	

Source: Report
Rules for classification: 1) Wins; 2) Head-to-head record; 3) Points scored.

21 October 2023
13:00

Report

Venezuela	21–17	Jamaica
Pts: Zapata 11		Pts: Primm 8

Estadio Español Las Condes, Santiago
Referees: Sonia Maldonado (PUR), Marie Houle (CAN)

21 October 2023
17:00

Report

Puerto Rico	22–11	Jamaica
Pts: Plácido, Torres 8		Pts: Primm 5

Estadio Español Las Condes, Santiago
Referees: Ana Zachi (BRA), Lautaro Ojeda (ARG)

22 October 2023
14:00

Report

Puerto Rico	22–11	Venezuela
Pts: Plácido 8		Pts: Zapata 6

Estadio Español Las Condes, Santiago
Referees: María Olivieri (ARG), Ana Zachi (BRA)

=== Group D ===
Pos	Team	Pld	W	L	PF	PA	PD	Qualification
1	Brazil	2	2	0	35	23	+12	Quarterfinals
2	Argentina	2	1	1	29	22	+7	Quarterfinals
3	Uruguay	2	0	2	21	40	−19	

Source: Report
Rules for classification: 1) Wins; 2) Head-to-head record; 3) Points scored.

21 October 2023
13:30

Report

Brazil	22–12	Uruguay
Pts: Domingos 9		Pts: Zeballos 7

Estadio Español Las Condes, Santiago
Referees: María Olivieri (ARG), Jorge Garcia (DOM)

21 October 2023
17:30

Report

Argentina	18–9	Uruguay
Pts: Pérez 6		Pts: Aza 4

Estadio Español Las Condes, Santiago
Referees: Marie Houle (CAN), Jorge García (DOM)

22 October 2023
14:30

Report

Argentina	11–13	Brazil
Pts: Gentinetta 5		Pts: Domingos 6

Estadio Español Las Condes, Santiago
Referees: Nicolás Sarli (URU), Yilizeth Vence (COL)

== Knockout round ==
Quarterfinals
22 October
United States	21
Venezuela	6
22 October
Brazil	14
Chile	18
22 October
Colombia	17
Argentina	9
22 October
Puerto Rico	20
Mexico	16

Semifinals
23 October
United States	21
Chile	14
23 October
Colombia	21
Puerto Rico	12

Gold medal
23 October
United States	21
Colombia	14
Bronze medal
23 October
Chile	22
Puerto Rico	11

=== Quarterfinals ===
22 October 2023
17:00

Report

United States	21–6	Venezuela
Pts: Dietrick 9		Pts: Sánchez 4

Estadio Español Las Condes, Santiago
Referees: Lautaro Ojeda (ARG), Jorge García (DOM)

22 October 2023
17:30

Report

Brazil	14–18	Chile
Pts: Domingos 7		Pts: Morrison 10

Estadio Español Las Condes, Santiago
Referees: Sonia Maldonado (PUR), Nicolás Sarli (URU)

22 October 2023
18:00

Report

Colombia	17–9	Argentina
Pts: Muñoz 7		Pts: Aylen Valdez 4

Estadio Español Las Condes, Santiago
Referees: Ana Zachi (BRA), Marie Houlie (CAN)

22 October 2023
18:30

Report

Puerto Rico	20–16	Mexico
Pts: Vargas 8		Pts: Rovira 7

Estadio Español Las Condes, Santiago
Referees: María Olivieri (ARG), Jorge García (DOM)

=== Semifinals ===
23 October 2023
16:00

Report

United States	21–14	Chile
Pts: Stevens 7		Pts: Novión 8

Estadio Español Las Condes, Santiago
Referees: María Olivieri (ARG), Nicolás Sarli (URU)

23 October 2023
16:30

Report

Colombia	21–12	Puerto Rico
Pts: López 7		Pts: Vargas 6

Estadio Español Las Condes, Santiago
Referees: Marie Houlie (CAN), Ana Zachi (BRA)

=== Bronze medal game ===
23 October 2023
18:30

Report

Chile	22–11	Puerto Rico
Pts: three players 6		Pts: Torres, Vargas 6

Estadio Español Las Condes, Santiago
Referees: Lautaro Ojeda (ARG), Marie Houlie (CAN)

=== Gold medal game ===
23 October 2023
18:30

Report

United States	21–14	Colombia
Pts: Stevens 11		Pts: Muñoz 6

Estadio Español Las Condes, Santiago
Referees: Felipe Valenzuela (CHI), María Olivieri (ARG)
