= 3x3 basketball at the Junior Pan American Games =

- 3x3 basketball
- Frequency: Every four years
- Inaugurated: 2021
- Most recent: 2025

3x3 basketball has been a discipline of the Junior Pan American Games event since the first edition in 2021 in Cali-Valle, Colombia.

== Overall medal table ==
Updated with 2025 results.

Rank	Nation	Gold	Silver	Bronze	Total
1	Argentina	1	0	1	2
2	Canada	1	0	0	1
2	Colombia	1	0	0	1
2	Puerto Rico	1	0	0	1
5	Chile	0	1	1	2
6	Dominican Republic	0	1	0	1
6	Mexico	0	1	0	1
6	Venezuela	0	1	0	1
9	Ecuador	0	0	1	1
9	Paraguay	0	0	1	1
Totals (10 entries)		4	4	4	12

== Men's tournament ==
=== Summaries ===
Junior Pan American Games
Years	Hosts	Gold	Silver	Bronze
2021; Details	Cali-Valle, Colombia	Puerto Rico	Venezuela	Chile
2025; Details	Asunción, Paraguay	Argentina	Chile	Ecuador

=== Men's medal table ===
Rank	Nation	Gold	Silver	Bronze	Total
1	Argentina	1	0	0	1
1	Puerto Rico	1	0	0	1
3	Chile	0	1	1	2
4	Venezuela	0	1	0	1
5	Ecuador	0	0	1	1
Totals (5 entries)		2	2	2	6

== Women's tournament ==
=== Summaries ===
Junior Pan American Games
Years	Hosts	Gold	Silver	Bronze
2021; Details	Cali-Valle, Colombia	Colombia	Dominican Republic	Argentina
2025; Details	Asunción, Paraguay	Canada	Mexico	Paraguay

=== Women's medal table ===
Rank	Nation	Gold	Silver	Bronze	Total
1	Canada	1	0	0	1
1	Colombia	1	0	0	1
3	Dominican Republic	0	1	0	1
3	Mexico	0	1	0	1
5	Argentina	0	0	1	1
5	Paraguay	0	0	1	1
Totals (6 entries)		2	2	2	6

== Shoot out contest ==
=== Summaries ===
Junior Pan American Games
Years	Hosts	Gold	Silver	Bronze
2021; Details	Cali-Valle, Colombia	Jovanka Ljubetic; Chile	Sofia Acevedo; Argentina	Hermann Andriano; Mexico
Discontinued

=== Shoot out contest medal table ===
Rank	Nation	Gold	Silver	Bronze	Total
1	Chile	1	0	0	1
2	Argentina	0	1	0	1
3	Mexico	0	0	1	1
Totals (3 entries)		1	1	1	3

== See also ==
- 3x3 basketball at the Pan American Games
- 3x3 basketball at the Summer Olympics
