= 2022 FIBA 3x3 World Cup =

Wereldkampioenschap 3×3-basketbal 2022 Coupe du monde de basket-ball 3×3 2022 3×3-Weltmeisterschaft 2022

Tournament details
- Host country: Belgium
- City: Antwerp
- Dates: 21–26 June 2022
- Teams: 40
- Venue: 1 (in 1 host city)

The 2022 FIBA 3x3 World Cup was an international 3x3 basketball event that featured separate competitions for men's and women's national teams. The tournament ran between 21 and 26 June 2022 in Antwerp, Belgium.

== Medal summary ==
=== Medal table ===
Rank	Nation	Gold	Silver	Bronze	Total
1	France	1	0	1	2
2	Serbia	1	0	0	1
3	Canada	0	1	0	1
3	Lithuania	0	1	0	1
5	China	0	0	1	1
Totals (5 entries)		2	2	2	6

=== Medalists ===
Event	Gold	Silver	Bronze
Men's team	Serbia; Marko Branković; Dejan Majstorović; Strahinja Stojačić; Mihailo Vasić	Lithuania; Gintautas Matulis; Darius Tarvydas; Marijus Užupis; Ignas Vaitkus	France; Léopold Cavalière; Antoine Eito; Franck Seguela; Alex Vialaret
Women's team	France; Myriam Djekoundade; Laëtitia Guapo; Hortense Limouzin; Marie-Ève Paget	Canada; Kacie Bosch; Paige Crozon; Katherine Plouffe; Michelle Plouffe	China; Cao Junwei; Wan Jiyuan; Wang Lili; Zhang Zhiting
