= Mexico women's national 3x3 team =

National 3x3 basketball team

Mexico
- FIBA zone: FIBA Americas

World Cup
- Appearances: 1

AmeriCup
- Appearances: 5

The Mexico women's national 3x3 team is a national basketball team of Mexico, administered by the Asociación Deportiva Mexicana de Basquetbol A.C. ADEMEBA.

It represents the country in international 3x3 (3 against 3) women's basketball competitions.

== Tournament record ==
=== World Cup ===
Year	Position	Pld	W	L
(Greece) 2012 Athens	23rd	5	0	5
(Russia) 2014 Moscow	Did not qualify			
(China) 2016 Guangzhou	Did not qualify			
(France) 2017 Nantes	Did not qualify			
(Philippines) 2018 Bocaue	Did not qualify			
(Netherlands) 2019 Amsterdam	Did not qualify			
(Belgium) 2022 Antwerp	Did not qualify			
(Austria) 2023 Vienna	Did not qualify			
(Mongolia) 2025 Ulaanbaatar	Did not qualify			
(Poland) 2026 Warsaw	To be determined			
2027 Singapore	To be determined			
Total	1/9	5	0	5

=== AmeriCup ===
Year	Position	Pld	W	L
(United States) 2021 Miami	7th	3	1	2
(United States) 2022 Miami	Did not participate			
(Puerto Rico) 2023 San Juan	11th	2	0	2
(Puerto Rico) 2024 San Juan	11th	2	0	2
(Mexico) 2025 León	6th	3	2	1
(El Salvador) 2026 San Salvador	10th	2	0	2
Total	5/6	12	3	9

== See also ==
- Mexico women's national basketball team
- Mexico men's national 3x3 team
