= 3x3 basketball at the 2022 Bolivarian Games =

Basketball competitions at the 2022 Bolivarian Games

- 3x3 basketball pictogram
- Venue: Parque Deportivo Garupal
- Dates: 26 June – 4 July 2022
- Competitors: 108 from 7 nations
- Teams: 9 (4 men and 5 women)

3x3 basketball competitions at the 2022 Bolivarian Games in Valledupar, Colombia were held from 26 June to 4 July 2022 at Parque Deportivo Garupal.

Two medal events were scheduled to be contested: a men's and women's tournaments. A total of 44 athletes (28 athletes–7 teams for men and 16 athletes–4 teams for women) will compete in the events. Both tournaments are open competitions without age restrictions.

This was the Bolivarian Games debut of 3x3 basketball for both men and women. 3x3 basketball made its first worldwide competitive appearance at the 2010 Summer Youth Olympics in Singapore and eleven years later debuted as an Olympic sport at the 2020 Summer Olympics (held in 2021) in Tokyo, Japan.

== Participating nations ==
A total of 7 nations (5 ODEBO nations and 2 invited) registered teams for the 3x3 basketball events. Each nation was able to enter a maximum of 8 athletes (two teams of 4 athletes per gender). Hosts Colombia, Ecuador, Dominican Republic and Venezuela will participate in both events. Bolivia, Chile and Guatemala will only participate in the men's tournament.

- Bolivia (4 athletes)
- Chile (4)
- Colombia (8)
- Dominican Republic (8)
- Ecuador (8)
- Guatemala (4)
- Venezuela (8)

== Medal summary ==
=== Medal table ===
* Host nation (Host nation)

Rank	Nation	Gold	Silver	Bronze	Total
1	Venezuela (VEN)	1	0	1	2
2	Colombia (COL)*	1	0	0	1
3	Ecuador (ECU)	0	2	0	2
4	Dominican Republic (DOM)	0	0	1	1
Totals (4 entries)		2	2	2	6

=== Medalists ===
Event	Gold	Silver	Bronze
Men's tournament	Venezuela; Luis Duarte; Jose Escobar; Ernesto Hernandez; Nelson Palacios	Ecuador; Abraham Barahona; Adriano Barreras; Alexander Guerra; Martin Martinez	Dominican Republic; Shamil Ballas; Saul Mejia; Rayner Moquete; Henry Valdez
Women's tournament	Colombia; Wendy Coy; Carolina Lopez; Yuliany Paz; Isabel Roriguez	Ecuador; Doris Lasso; Ana Isabel Mora; Noelia Moran; Dayanna Salcedo	Venezuela; Eduglatriz Castro; Andrea Martinez; Edglimar Montero; Vanessa Sanchez

== Venue ==
All matches of both tournaments will be played at Parque Deportivo Garupal in Valledupar. The 3x3 basketball event had originally been scheduled to be held at Valledupar's Plaza Alfonso López. however it was eventually moved to the Parque Deportivo Garupal.

== Men's tournament ==
2022 Bolivarian Games Men's 3x3 Basketball tournament
Juegos Bolivarianos 2022 Campeonato de Baloncesto 3x3 Masculino

Tournament details
- Host country: Colombia
- City: Valledupar
- Dates: 24–28 June
- Teams: 7 (from 2 confederations)
- Venue: 1 (in 1 host city)

The men's tournament will be held from 2–4 July 2022 and consists of a preliminary round (group stage) and a final round.

All match times are in COT (UTC−5).

=== Preliminary round ===
The preliminary round consists of a single group of 7 teams in which each team will play once against the other 6 teams in the group on a single round-robin basis, with the top four teams advancing to the semi-finals.

Pos	Team	Pld	W	L	PF	PA	PD	Qualification
1	Bolivia	0	0	0	0	0	0	Semi-finals
2	Colombia (H)	0	0	0	0	0	0	Semi-finals
3	Chile	0	0	0	0	0	0	Semi-finals
4	Ecuador	0	0	0	0	0	0	Semi-finals
5	Guatemala	0	0	0	0	0	0	
6	Dominican Republic	0	0	0	0	0	0	
7	Venezuela	0	0	0	0	0	0	

Updated to match(es) played on 2 July 2022. Source: Bolivarianos Valledupar 2022
Rules for classification: 1) Points; 2) Head-to-head results; 3) Points difference; 4) Points scored.
(H) Hosts

2 July 2022
12:30

[ Report]

Chile	vs.	Guatemala

Parque Deportivo Garupal

2 July 2022
13:00

[ Report]

Ecuador	vs.	Dominican Republic

Parque Deportivo Garupal

2 July 2022
13:30

[ Report]

Bolivia	vs.	Colombia

Parque Deportivo Garupal

2 July 2022
14:30

[ Report]

Venezuela	vs.	Chile

Parque Deportivo Garupal

2 July 2022
15:00

[ Report]

Colombia	vs.	Ecuador

Parque Deportivo Garupal

2 July 2022
15:30

[ Report]

Bolivia	vs.	Guatemala

Parque Deportivo Garupal

2 July 2022
16:30

[ Report]

Guatemala	vs.	Ecuador

Parque Deportivo Garupal

2 July 2022
17:00

[ Report]

Bolivia	vs.	Venezuela

Parque Deportivo Garupal

2 July 2022
17:30

[ Report]

Colombia	vs.	Dominican Republic

Parque Deportivo Garupal

3 July 2022
12:30

[ Report]

Chile	vs.	Ecuador

Parque Deportivo Garupal

3 July 2022
13:00

[ Report]

Colombia	vs.	Guatemala

Parque Deportivo Garupal

3 July 2022
13:30

[ Report]

Dominican Republic	vs.	Venezuela

Parque Deportivo Garupal

3 July 2022
14:30

[ Report]

Bolivia	vs.	Chile

Parque Deportivo Garupal

3 July 2022
15:00

[ Report]

Venezuela	vs.	Ecuador

Parque Deportivo Garupal

3 July 2022
15:30

[ Report]

Guatemala	vs.	Dominican Republic

Parque Deportivo Garupal

3 July 2022
16:30

[ Report]

Bolivia	vs.	Ecuador

Parque Deportivo Garupal

3 July 2022
17:00

[ Report]

Chile	vs.	Dominican Republic

Parque Deportivo Garupal

3 July 2022
17:30

[ Report]

Venezuela	vs.	Colombia

Parque Deportivo Garupal

4 July 2022
13:00

[ Report]

Bolivia	vs.	Dominican Republic

Parque Deportivo Garupal

4 July 2022
13:30

[ Report]

Guatemala	vs.	Venezuela

Parque Deportivo Garupal

4 July 2022
14:00

[ Report]

Colombia	vs.	Chile

Parque Deportivo Garupal

=== Final round ===
The final round consists of the semi-finals and the bronze and gold medal matches. The semi-finals match-ups are:

- Semifinal 1: Prel. round 1st place v Prel. round 4th place
- Semifinal 2: Prel. round 2nd place v Prel. round 3rd place

Winners of semi-finals will play the gold medal match, while losers will play the bronze medal match.

Semi-finals
Prel. round 1st place
Prel. round 4th place
Prel. round 2nd place
Prel. round 3rd place

Gold medal match
Bronze medal match

==== Semi-finals ====
4 July 2022
15:30

[ Report]

Prel. round 2nd place	vs.	Prel. round 3rd place

Parque Deportivo Garupal

4 July 2022
16:00

[ Report]

Prel. round 1st place	vs.	Prel. round 4th place

Parque Deportivo Garupal

==== Bronze medal match ====
4 July 2022
17:00

[ Report]

Parque Deportivo Garupal

==== Gold medal match ====
4 July 2022
17:30

[ Report]

Parque Deportivo Garupal

== Women's tournament ==
2022 Bolivarian Games Women's 3x3 Basketball tournament
Juegos Bolivarianos 2022 Campeonato de Baloncesto 3x3 Femenino

Tournament details
- Host country: Colombia
- City: Valledupar
- Dates: 26–28 June
- Teams: 4 (from 2 confederations)
- Venue: 1 (in 1 host city)

The women's tournament will be held from 26–28 June 2022 and consists of a preliminary round (group stage) and a final round.

All match times are in COT (UTC−5).

=== Preliminary round ===
The preliminary round consists of a single group of 4 teams in which each team will play twice against the other 3 teams in the group on a round-robin basis, with all the 4 teams advancing to the semi-finals.

Pos	Team	Pld	W	L	PF	PA	PD
1	Colombia (H)	0	0	0	0	0	0
2	Ecuador	0	0	0	0	0	0
3	Dominican Republic	0	0	0	0	0	0
4	Venezuela	0	0	0	0	0	0

Updated to match(es) played on 26 June 2022. Source: Bolivarianos Valledupar 2022
Rules for classification: 1) Points; 2) Head-to-head results; 3) Points difference; 4) Points scored.
(H) Hosts

26 June 2022
14:00

[ Report]

Venezuela	vs.	Dominican Republic

Parque Deportivo Garupal

26 June 2022
14:30

[ Report]

Ecuador	vs.	Colombia

Parque Deportivo Garupal

26 June 2022
15:30

[ Report]

Venezuela	vs.	Ecuador

Parque Deportivo Garupal

26 June 2022
16:00

[ Report]

Dominican Republic	vs.	Colombia

Parque Deportivo Garupal

26 June 2022
17:00

[ Report]

Ecuador	vs.	Dominican Republic

Parque Deportivo Garupal

26 June 2022
17:30

[ Report]

Colombia	vs.	Venezuela

Parque Deportivo Garupal

27 June 2022
14:00

[ Report]

Dominican Republic	vs.	Ecuador

Parque Deportivo Garupal

27 June 2022
14:30

[ Report]

Venezuela	vs.	Colombia

Parque Deportivo Garupal

27 June 2022
15:30

[ Report]

Dominican Republic	vs.	Venezuela

Parque Deportivo Garupal

27 June 2022
16:00

[ Report]

Colombia	vs.	Ecuador

Parque Deportivo Garupal

27 June 2022
17:00

[ Report]

Ecuador	vs.	Venezuela

Parque Deportivo Garupal

27 June 2022
17:30

[ Report]

Colombia	vs.	Dominican Republic

Parque Deportivo Garupal

=== Final round ===
The final round consists of the semi-finals and the bronze and gold medal matches. The semi-finals match-ups are:

- Semifinal 1: Prel. round 1st place v Prel. round 4th place
- Semifinal 2: Prel. round 2nd place v Prel. round 3rd place

Winners of semi-finals will play the gold medal match, while losers will play the bronze medal match.

Semi-finals
Prel. round 1st place
Prel. round 4th place
Prel. round 2nd place
Prel. round 3rd place

Gold medal match
Bronze medal match

==== Semi-finals ====
28 June 2022
15:30

[ Report]

Prel. round 1st place	vs.	Prel. round 4th place

Parque Deportivo Garupal

28 June 2022
16:00

[ Report]

Prel. round 2nd place	vs.	Prel. round 3rd place

Parque Deportivo Garupal

==== Bronze medal match ====
28 June 2022
17:00

[ Report]

Parque Deportivo Garupal

==== Gold medal match ====
28 June 2022
17:30

[ Report]

Parque Deportivo Garupal
