= 2026 FIBA 3x3 AmeriCup – Women's tournament =

Tournament details
- Host country: El Salvador
- Dates: 28 October – 1 November
- Teams: 20

Final positions
- Champions: Canada (3rd title)
- Runners-up: United States
- Third place: Colombia
- Fourth place: Cuba

Tournament statistics
- MVP: (Canada) Michelle Plouffe

The 2026 FIBA 3x3 AmeriCup – Women's tournament was the eighth edition of the FIBA 3x3 AmeriCup, the annual international 3x3 basketball championship organised under the auspices of FIBA Americas for women's national teams in the Americas.

The tournament took place in El Salvador from 28 October to 1 November 2026, marking the first time the country host the event and first time it was in Central America.

United States were the defending champions, most recently beating Canada in the final in León. Canada did beat the United States this time for their third title.

== Host selection ==
On 23 February 2026, El Salvador was given the hosting rights for the 2026 and 2027 rights. This will be the first time the tournament will be in the country and the first time it will be in Central America.

== Qualifying draw ==
The group winners qualified for the next round.

=== Pool QD A ===
Pos	Team	Pld	W	L	PF	PA	PD	Qualification	(Colombia)	(Brazil)	(Uruguay)
1	Colombia	2	2	0	37	27	+10	Preliminary round			
2	Brazil	2	1	1	34	24	+10		16–18		18–6
3	Uruguay	2	0	2	17	37	−20		11–19		

Source: FIBA
Legend: Blue = home team win; Red = away team win.
Rules for classification: 1) Wins; 2) Head-to-head record; 3) Points scored.

=== Pool QD B ===
Pos	Team	Pld	W	L	PF	PA	PD	Qualification	(Cuba)	(Guatemala)	(Dominican Republic)	(Saint Lucia)
1	Cuba	3	3	0	54	30	+24	Preliminary round		18–13		21–6
2	Guatemala	3	2	1	52	34	+18				18–14	
3	Dominican Republic	3	1	2	46	38	+8		11–15			21–5
4	Saint Lucia	3	0	3	13	63	−50			2–21		

Source: FIBA
Legend: Blue = home team win; Red = away team win.
Rules for classification: 1) Wins; 2) Head-to-head record; 3) Points scored.

=== Pool QD C ===
Pos	Team	Pld	W	L	PF	PA	PD	Qualification	(Paraguay)	(Honduras)	(Nicaragua)	(Jamaica)
1	Paraguay	3	3	0	63	19	+44	Preliminary round		21–8	21–8	
2	Honduras	3	2	1	44	40	+4				14–13	
3	Nicaragua	3	1	2	42	44	−2					21–9
4	Jamaica	3	0	3	18	64	−46		3–21	6–22		

Source: FIBA
Legend: Blue = home team win; Red = away team win.
Rules for classification: 1) Wins; 2) Head-to-head record; 3) Points scored.

== Preliminary round ==
=== Pool A ===
Pos	Team	Pld	W	L	PF	PA	PD	Qualification	(Canada)	(El Salvador)	(Venezuela)
1	Canada	2	2	0	42	13	+29	Knockout stage		21–6	21–7
2	El Salvador (H)	2	1	1	27	35	−8	Knockout stage			
3	Venezuela	2	0	2	21	42	−21			14–21	

Source: FIBA
Legend: Blue = home team win; Red = away team win.
Rules for classification: 1) Wins; 2) Head-to-head record; 3) Points scored.
(H) Hosts

=== Pool B ===
Pos	Team	Pld	W	L	PF	PA	PD	Qualification	(United States)	(Colombia)	(Cayman Islands)
1	United States	2	2	0	42	11	+31	Knockout stage		21–7	21–4
2	Colombia	2	1	1	28	23	+5	Knockout stage			
3	Cayman Islands	2	0	2	6	42	−36			2–21	

Source: FIBA
Legend: Blue = home team win; Red = away team win.
Rules for classification: 1) Wins; 2) Head-to-head record; 3) Points scored.

=== Pool C ===
Pos	Team	Pld	W	L	PF	PA	PD	Qualification	(Cuba)	(Chile)	(Mexico)
1	Cuba	2	2	0	32	30	+2	Knockout stage			
2	Chile	2	1	1	28	27	+1	Knockout stage	13–14		15–13
3	Mexico	2	0	2	30	33	−3		17–18		

Source: FIBA
Legend: Blue = home team win; Red = away team win.
Rules for classification: 1) Wins; 2) Head-to-head record; 3) Points scored.

=== Pool D ===
Pos	Team	Pld	W	L	PF	PA	PD	Qualification	(Argentina)	(Paraguay)	(Puerto Rico)
1	Argentina	2	2	0	38	31	+7	Knockout stage		17–15	
2	Paraguay	2	1	1	36	33	+3	Knockout stage			
3	Puerto Rico	2	0	2	32	42	−10		16–21	16–21	

Source: FIBA
Legend: Blue = home team win; Red = away team win.
Rules for classification: 1) Wins; 2) Head-to-head record; 3) Points scored.

== Knockout stage ==
Quarter-finals
1 November
Canada	18
Chile	10
1 November
Argentina	11
Colombia	21
1 November
United States	21
Paraguay	18
1 November
Cuba	21
El Salvador	12

Semi-finals
1 November
Canada	21
Colombia	11
1 November
United States	21
Cuba	17

Final
1 November
Canada	21
United States	12
Third place
1 November
Colombia	15
Cuba	12

== Final ranking ==
Rank	Team	Record
1st place, gold medalist(s)	Canada	5–0
2nd place, silver medalist(s)	United States	4–1
3rd place, bronze medalist(s)	Colombia	3–2
4	Cuba	3–2
5	Argentina	2–1
6	Paraguay	1–2
7	El Salvador	1–2
8	Chile	1–2
9	Puerto Rico	0–2
10	Mexico	0–2
11	Venezuela	0–2
12	Cayman Islands	0–2
Eliminated in qualifying draw
13	Guatemala	2–1
14	Honduras	2–1
15	Brazil	1–1
16	Dominican Republic	1–2
17	Nicaragua	1–2
18	Uruguay	0–2
19	Jamaica	0–3
20	Saint Lucia	0–3
