= Israel women's national 3x3 team =

National basketball team

Israel
- FIBA ranking: 17
- FIBA zone: FIBA Europe
- National federation: IBBA

World Cup
- Appearances: 2
- Medals: None

Europe Cup
- Appearances: 3
- Medals: None

The Israel women's national 3x3 team is a national basketball team of Israel, administered by the Israel Basketball Association. It represents the country in international women's 3x3 (3 against 3) basketball competitions.

== World Cup record ==
Year	Position	Pld	W	L	Players
(Greece) 2012 Athens	Did not qualify				
(Russia) 2014 Moscow	Did not qualify				
(China) 2016 Guangzhou	Did not qualify				
(France) 2017 Nantes	Did not qualify				
(Philippines) 2018 Bocaue	Did not qualify				
(Netherlands) 2019 Amsterdam	Did not qualify				
(Belgium) 2022 Antwerp	19th	4	0	4	Alexandra Cohen, Hadar Hadad, Daniel Raber, Tslil Vaturi
(Austria) 2023 Vienna	11th	5	3	2	Drew Edelman, Hadar Hadad, Dor Saar, Nofar Shalom
(Mongolia) 2025 Ulaanbaatar	Did not qualify				
(Poland) 2026 Warsaw	To be determined				
2027 Singapore	To be determined				
Total	2/11	9	3	6	

== European Championships ==
Year	Position	Pld	W	L	Players
(Romania) 2014 Bucharest	13th	3	1	2	
(Romania) 2016 Bucharest	did not qualify				
(Netherlands) 2017 Amsterdam	did not qualify				
(Romania) 2018 Bucharest	did not qualify				
(Hungary) 2019 Debrecen	did not qualify				
(France) 2021 Paris	12th	2	0	2	Alyssa Baron, Daniel Raber, Yara Yitzchaki, Tal Yaakov
(Austria) 2022 Graz	did not qualify				
(Israel) 2023 Jerusalem	9th	2	0	2	Alyssa Baron, Drew Edelman, Hadar Hadad, Ofir Kesten Raz
(Austria) 2024 Vienna	did not qualify				
(Denmark) 2025 Copenhagen	future events				
(Belgium) 2026 Antwerp	future events				
Total	3/9	7	1	6	

== See also ==
- Israel women's national basketball team
- Israel men's national 3x3 team
