= FIBA 3x3 Women's Series =

- Founded: 2019; 7 years ago
- First season: 2019
- Confederation: FIBA
- Current champions: France (3rd title) (2026)
- Most championships: Canada France (3 titles)
- Website: womensseries.fiba3x3.com
- 2026 FIBA 3x3 Women's Series

The FIBA 3x3 Women's Series (3x3WS) is an international tour of women's 3x3 basketball teams. It is the professional circuit for women participated by both national teams and commercial teams.

The FIBA 3x3 Women's Series was launched in 2019, with the finals held in Edmonton.

In 2021 and 2022, the WS Finals were held in Romania. In 2023 it was held in Ulaanbaatar, Mongolia.

In 2024, the Women's Series Finals were held in Hangzhou, China. From 2025, Shanghai was named as host for the next four editions until 2028.

== Finals results ==
Year	Finals host	Stops	Winners	Runners-up	Third place	Ref.
2019	(Canada) Edmonton	14	France	Canada	Italy	
2020	Not held					
2021	(Romania) Bucharest	6	Germany	Canada	Poland	
2022	(Romania) Constanța	11	Canada	France	United States	
2023	(Mongolia) Ulaanbaatar	22	Canada	France	China	
2024	(China) Hangzhou	18	France	Netherlands	Canada	
2025	(China) Shanghai	14	Canada	Azerbaijan	Netherlands	
2026	(China) Shanghai	20	France	(Romania) CS Rapid Bucharest	Netherlands	
2027	(China) Shanghai	To be determined				
