= Lithuania women's national 3x3 team =

Lithuanian national basketball team

Lithuania
- FIBA ranking: 3
- FIBA zone: FIBA Europe
- National federation: LKF

World Cup
- Appearances: 3

Europe Cup
- Appearances: 5

The Lithuania women's national 3x3 basketball team is the basketball side that represents Lithuania in international 3x3 basketball (3 against 3) competitions. It is organized and run by the Lithuanian Basketball Federation.

== World Cup record ==
Year	Position	Pld	W	L
(Greece) 2012 Athens	Did not qualify			
(Russia) 2014 Moscow	Did not qualify			
(China) 2016 Guangzhou	Did not qualify			
(France) 2017 Nantes	Did not qualify			
(Philippines) 2018 Bocaue	Did not qualify			
(Netherlands) 2019 Amsterdam	Did not qualify			
(Belgium) 2022 Antwerp	4th	8	5	3
(Austria) 2023 Vienna	15th	4	1	3
(Mongolia) 2025 Ulaanbaatar	Did not qualify			
(Poland) 2026 Warsaw	11th	5	2	3
2027 Singapore	To be determined			
Total	3/11	17	8	9

== See also ==
- Lithuania women's national basketball team
