= Basketball at the 2019 Pan American Games – Women's 3x3 tournament =

Women's 3x3 basketball at the 2019 Pan American Games
- Venue: Coliseo Eduardo Dibos
- Dates: July 27–29, 2019
- Competitors: 24 from 6 nations

Medalists
Gold medal	United States (1st title)
Silver medal	Argentina
Bronze medal	Dominican Republic

The women's 3x3 basketball tournament at the 2019 Pan American Games in Lima, Peru was held between 27 and 29 July 2019.

== Qualification ==
Teams were entered based on their FIBA Ranking. Host nation Peru was barred from participating following sanctions imposed on the Peruvian Basketball Federation.

Event	Date	Vacancies	Qualified
Host Nation	—N/a	~~1~~ 0	~~Peru~~
FIBA Rankings	November 1, 2018	6	Brazil; Venezuela; United States; Argentina; Uruguay; Dominican Republic
Total		6	

== Rosters ==
Team	Players			
Argentina	Andrea Boquete	Melisa Gretter	Victoria Llorente	Natacha Pérez
Brazil	Luana Fernandes	Evelyn Mariano	Aldecinete Mineiro	Carla Silva
Dominican Republic	Carolay Hernández	Sugeiry Monsac	Giocelis Reynoso	Nelsy Sentil
United States	Ruthy Hebard	Sabrina Ionescu	Olivia Nelson-Ododa	Christyn Williams
Uruguay	Daiana Cartró	Natasha Dolinsky	Aldana Gayoso	Lucia Schiavo
Venezuela	Yosimar Corrales	Ivaney Márquez	Waleska Pérez	Daniela Wallen

== Results ==
=== Preliminary round ===
Pos	Team	Pld	W	L	PF	PA	PD	Qualification
1	United States	5	5	0	102	48	+54	Semifinals
2	Argentina	5	4	1	76	68	+8	Semifinals
3	Dominican Republic	5	3	2	68	73	−5	Semifinals
4	Brazil	5	2	3	76	89	−13	Semifinals
5	Venezuela	5	1	4	72	80	−8	Fifth place match
6	Uruguay	5	0	5	55	91	−36	Fifth place match

Source: Lima 2019
Rules for classification: 1) Wins; 2) Head-to-head record; 3) Points scored.

27 July 2019
14:30

Report

Brazil	14–16	Dominican Republic
Pts: Mariano, Mineiro 5		Pts: Hernández 9

Coliseo Eduardo Dibos
Referees: Sonia Maldonado / Ángel Martínez (PUR)

27 July 2019
15:00

Report

Venezuela	14–8	Uruguay
Pts: Wallen, Pérez 5		Pts: Gayoso 3

Coliseo Eduardo Dibos
Referees: Glenn Tuitt (USA) / Carolina Zachi (BRA)

27 July 2019
15:30

Report

United States	21–15	Argentina
Pts: Ionescu, Hebard 9		Pts: Llorente 8

Coliseo Eduardo Dibos
Referees: Kayla Herdman (CAN) / Gonzalo Paz (URU)

27 July 2019
17:30

Report

Dominican Republic	10–12	Argentina
Pts: Monsac 5		Pts: Boquete 8

Coliseo Eduardo Dibos
Referees: Kayla Herdman (CAN) / Carolina Zachi (BRA)

27 July 2019
18:00

Report

Uruguay	5–21	United States
Pts: Gayoso 5		Pts: Hebard 7

Coliseo Eduardo Dibos
Referees: Kayla Herdman (CAN) / Sonia Maldonado (PUR)

27 July 2019
18:30

Report

Brazil	22–20	Venezuela
Pts: Mariano 8		Pts: Wallen 10

Coliseo Eduardo Dibos
Referees: Ángel Martínez (PUR) / Glenn Tuitt (USA)

27 July 2019
20:30

Report

Venezuela	13–18	Dominican Republic
Pts: Wallen 7		Pts: Monsac, Hernández 6

Coliseo Eduardo Dibos
Referees: Sonia Maldonado (PUR) / Carolina Zachi (BRA)

27 July 2019
21:00

Report

United States	21–7	Brazil
Pts: Hebard 10		Pts: Mineiro 3

Coliseo Eduardo Dibos
Referees: Ángel Martínez (PUR) / Gonzalo Paz (URU)

27 July 2019
21:30

Report

Argentina	19–13	Uruguay
Pts: Llorente 10		Pts: Gayoso 8

Coliseo Eduardo Dibos
Referees: Kayla Herdman (CAN) / Carolina Zachi (BRA)

28 July 2019
16:00

Report

Dominican Republic	17–13	Uruguay
Pts: Reynoso 9		Pts: Dolinsky 6

Coliseo Eduardo Dibos
Referees: Sonia Maldonado (PUR) / Glenn Tuitt (USA)

28 July 2019
16:30

Report

Brazil	13–16	Argentina
Pts: Silva, Mineiro 4		Pts: 4 players 4

Coliseo Eduardo Dibos
Referees: Kayla Herdman (CAN) / Ángel Martínez (PUR)

28 July 2019
17:00

Report

Venezuela	14–18	United States
Pts: Pérez 6		Pts: Hebard, Ionescu 7

Coliseo Eduardo Dibos
Referees: Gonzalo Paz (URU) / Carolina Zachi (BRA)

28 July 2019
19:00

Report

United States	21–7	Dominican Republic
Pts: Hebard, Willams 7		Pts: Monsac 5

Coliseo Eduardo Dibos
Referees: Carolina Zachi (BRA) / Sonia Maldonado (PUR)

28 July 2019
19:30

Report

Argentina	14–11	Venezuela
Pts: Boquete 8		Pts: Wallen 8

Coliseo Eduardo Dibos
Referees: Gonzalo Paz (URU) / Carolina Zachi (BRA)

28 July 2019
20:00

Report

Uruguay	16–20	Brazil
Pts: Gayoso 10		Pts: Silva 7

Coliseo Eduardo Dibos
Referees: Sonia Maldonado (PUR) / Ángel Martínez (PUR)

=== Fifth place match ===
5th place match
5	Venezuela	21
6	Uruguay	11

29 July 2019
11:00

Report

Venezuela	21–11	Uruguay
Pts: Márquez 8		Pts: Gayoso 9

Coliseo Eduardo Dibos
Referees: Sonia Maldonado (PUR) / Carolina Zachi (BRA)

=== Medal round ===
Semifinals
1	United States	21
4	Brazil	5
2	Argentina	21
3	Dominican Republic	8

Gold medal
1	United States	21
2	Argentina	17
Bronze medal
4	Brazil	15
3	Dominican Republic	20

==== Semifinals ====
29 July 2019
9:00

Report

United States	21–5	Brazil
Pts: Ionescu 9		Pts: Mariano 2

Coliseo Eduardo Dibos
Referees: Kayla Herdman (CAN) / Sonia Maldonado (CAN)

29 July 2019
9:30

Report

Argentina	21–8	Dominican Republic
Pts: Gretter 8		Pts: Reynoso 4

Coliseo Eduardo Dibos
Referees: Gonzalo Paz (URU) / Carolina Zachi (BRA)

==== Bronze medal match ====
29 July 2019
12:00

Report

Brazil	15–20	Dominican Republic
Pts: three players 4		Pts: Reynoso 8

Coliseo Eduardo Dibos
Referees: Kayla Herdman (CAN) / Sonia Maldonado (PUR)

==== Gold medal match ====
29 July 2019
13:00

Report

United States	21–17	Argentina
Pts: Ionescu, Hebard 7		Pts: Boquete 5

Coliseo Eduardo Dibos
Referees: Ángel Martínez (PUR) / Carolina Zachi (BRA)
