= El Salvador women's national 3x3 team =

National 3x3 basketball team

El Salvador
- FIBA zone: FIBA Americas
- National federation: Federación Salvadoreña de Baloncesto

AmeriCup
- Appearances: 1

The El Salvador women's national 3x3 team is a national basketball team of El Salvador, administered by the Federación Salvadoreña de Baloncesto. It represents the country in international 3x3 (3 against 3) basketball competitions.

== AmeriCup record ==
| Year | Position | Pld | W | L |
|---|---|---|---|---|
| (United States) 2021 Miami | did not qualify | | | |
| (United States) 2022 Miami | did not qualify | | | |
| (Puerto Rico) 2023 San Juan | did not qualify | | | |
| (Puerto Rico) 2024 San Juan | did not qualify | | | |
| (Mexico) 2025 León | did not qualify | | | |
| (El Salvador) 2026 San Salvador | 7th | 3 | 1 | 2 |
| Total | 1/6 | 3 | 1 | 2 |
