= 2022 FIBA 3x3 World Cup – Women's tournament =

Basketball competition in Belgium

2022 FIBA 3x3 World Cup
Tournament details
- Host country: Belgium
- Dates: 21–26 June
- Teams: 20
- Venue: 1 (in 1 host city)

Final positions
- Champions: France (1st title)
- Runners-up: Canada
- Third place: China
- Fourth place: Lithuania

Tournament statistics
- MVP: (France) Laëtitia Guapo

The 2022 FIBA 3x3 World Cup was held in Antwerp, Belgium from 21 to 26 June 2022.

France captured their first title after defeating Canada in the final.

== Participating teams ==
All FIBA continental zones are represented by at least one team. After the exclusion of Russia due to the 2022 Russian invasion of Ukraine, Israel was named as their replacement. The numbers in brackets show the FIBA World rank.

FIBA Africa Team Egypt (13)	FIBA Americas Team United States (8) Canada (14) Chile (19) Dominican Republic (22) Brazil (24)	FIBA Asia and FIBA Oceania Team Mongolia (7) Japan (25) China (28) New Zealand (37)	FIBA Europe Team Germany (1) France (2) Poland (3) Spain (4) Netherlands (5) Romania (9) Lithuania (10) Austria (11) Israel (12) Belgium (39) (hosts)

== Players ==
Team	Players			
Austria	Alexia Allesch	Anja Fuchs-Robetin	Camilla Neumann	Michaela Wildbacher
Belgium	Ine Joris	Becky Massey	Laure Resimont	Julie Vanloo
Brazil	Luana Batista	Vanessa Gonçalves	Gabriela Guimarães	Vitória Marcelino
Canada	Kacie Bosch	Paige Crozon	Katherine Plouffe	Michelle Plouffe
China	Cao Junwei	Wan Jiyuan	Wang Lili	Zhang Zhiting
Chile	Paula Carrasco	Bárbara Cousiño	Anahi Morán	Ziomara Morrison
Dominican Republic	Genesis Evangelista	Cheisy Hernández	Sugeiry Monsac	
Egypt	Meral Abdelgawad	Hala Elshaarawy	Asrar Maged	Radwa Sherif
France	Myriam Djekoundade	Laëtitia Guapo	Hortense Limouzin	Marie-Ève Paget
Germany	Svenja Brunckhorst	Leonie Fiebich	Sonja Greinacher	Luana Rodefeld
Israel	Alexandra Cohen	Hadar Hadad	Daniel Raber	Tslil Vaturi
Japan	Stephanie Mawuli	Moe Nagata	Tamami Nakada	Mai Yamamoto
Lithuania	Monika Grigalauskytė	Kamilė Nacickaitė	Martyna Petrėnaitė	Gabrielė Šulskė
Mongolia	Baataryn Bolor-Erdene	Bat-Erdeniin Ariuntsetseg	Mönkhsaikhany Tserenlkham	Onolbaataryn Khulan
Netherlands	Loyce Bettonvil	Noortje Driessen	Janine Guijt	Natalie van den Adel
New Zealand	Tiarna Clarke	Ella Fotu	Jillian Harmon	Kalani Purcel
Romania	Alina-Maria Podar	Ancuţa Stoenescu	Sonia Ursu	Anamaria Vîrjoghe
Poland	Klaudia Gertchen	Aldona Morawiec	Dominika Owczarzak	Klaudia Sosnowska
Spain	Marta Canella	Aitana Cuevas	Vega Gimeno	Sandra Ygueravide
United States	Cierra Burdick	Lauren Cox	Ashley Joens	Hailey Van Lith

== Preliminary round ==
The pools were announced on 4 April 2022. The schedule was released on 12 May 2022.

=== Pool A ===
Pos	Team	Pld	W	L	PF	PA	PD	Qualification	People's Republic of China	Lithuania	Germany	Japan	Romania
1	China	4	3 (Note: China 15–11 Lithuania)	1	71	50	+21	Quarterfinals		15–11	21–10		
2	Lithuania	4	3	1	68	62	+6	Round of 16			18–16	21–14	
3	Germany	4	2 (Note: Germany 17–13 Japan)	2	59	66	−7	Round of 16				17–13	16–14
4	Japan	4	2	2	62	66	−4		17–14				18–14
5	Romania	4	0	4	57	73	−16		12–21	17–18			

Source: FIBA
Rules for classification: 1) Wins; 2) Head-to-head record; 3) Points scored.

=== Pool B ===
Pos	Team	Pld	W	L	PF	PA	PD	Qualification	United States	France	Brazil	New Zealand	Austria
1	United States	4	4	0	75	62	+13	Quarterfinals				19–14	18–16
2	France	4	3	1	72	51	+21	Round of 16	18–20 (OT)		22–11		
3	Brazil	4	2	2	57	63	−6	Round of 16	14–18			16–9	
4	New Zealand	4	1	3	51	65	−14			10–16			18–14
5	Austria	4	0	4	54	68	−14			10–16	14–16		

Source: FIBA
Rules for classification: 1) Wins; 2) Head-to-head record; 3) Points scored.

=== Pool C ===
Pos	Team	Pld	W	L	PF	PA	PD	Qualification	Poland	Belgium	Mongolia	Egypt	Dominican Republic
1	Poland	3	3	0	57	29	+28	Quarterfinals			22–7		
2	Belgium	3	2	1	43	27	+16	Round of 16	12–13			19–6	
3	Mongolia	3	1	2	36	47	−11	Round of 16		8–12		21–13	
4	Egypt	3	0	3	29	62	−33		10–22				
5	Dominican Republic (Note: The Dominican Republic withdrew before the tournament.)	0	0	0	0	0	0	Withdrawn					

Source: FIBA
Rules for classification: 1) Wins; 2) Head-to-head record; 3) Points scored.

=== Pool D ===
Pos	Team	Pld	W	L	PF	PA	PD	Qualification	Spain	Canada	Netherlands	Chile	Israel
1	Spain	4	4	0	83	56	+27	Quarterfinals			22–9	21–15	
2	Canada	4	3	1	70	45	+25	Round of 16	16–18			21–10	
3	Netherlands	4	2	2	59	62	−3	Round of 16		12–21			17–11
4	Chile	4	1	3	61	77	−16				18–21		18–14
5	Israel (Note: Israel replaced Russia.)	4	0	4	46	79	−33		16–22	5–22			

Source: FIBA
Rules for classification: 1) Wins; 2) Head-to-head record; 3) Points scored.

== Knockout stage ==
Round of 16
25 June
Belgium	15
Brazil	9
25 June
France	21
Mongolia	9
25 June
Lithuania	19
Netherlands	10
25 June
Canada	22
Germany	13

Quarter-finals
25 June
China	21
Belgium	13
25 June
France (OT)	15
Spain	14
25 June
Lithuania	19
Poland	16
25 June
Canada	14
United States	10

Semi-finals
26 June
China	16
France	17
26 June
Lithuania	14
Canada	16

Final
26 June
France	16
Canada	13
Third place
26 June
China	21
Lithuania	11

== Final standings ==
Rank	Team	Record
1st place, gold medalist(s)	France	7–1
2nd place, silver medalist(s)	Canada	6–2
3rd place, bronze medalist(s)	China	5–2
4	Lithuania	5–3
5	Spain	4–1
6	Poland	3–1
7	United States	4–1
8	Belgium	3–2
9	Germany	2–3
10	Netherlands	2–3
11	Brazil	2–3
12	Mongolia	1–3
13	Japan	2–2
14	Chile	1–3
15	New Zealand	1–3
16	Egypt	0–3
17	Romania	0–4
18	Austria	0–4
19	Israel	0–4
WD	Dominican Republic	

== Awards ==
2022 FIBA 3x3 World Champions – Women's

France
1st title

=== Individual ===
Most Valuable Player

- (France) Laëtitia Guapo

Team of the Tournament

- (France) Laëtitia Guapo
- (Canada) Michelle Plouffe
- (China) Wang Lili

Top scorers

Name	Points
(Lithuania) Kamilė Nacickaitė	45
(France) Laëtitia Guapo	43
(Canada) Michelle Plouffe	42
(China) Zhang Zhiting	42
(Chile) Ziomara Morrison	39
