= FIBA 3x3 AmeriCup =

International 3x3 basketball tournament

- Sport: 3x3 Basketball
- Founded: 2021; 5 years ago
- First season: 2021
- Organising body: FIBA
- No. of teams: 34; 19 Men teams and 15 Women teams
- Country: FIBA Americas member nations
- Continent: FIBA Americas (Americas)
- Most recent champions: United States (men); Canada (women)
- Most titles: United States (men; 5 titles); United States; Canada (women; 3 titles each)
- Related competitions: FIBA 3x3 World Cup
- Website: FIBA Americas

The FIBA 3x3 AmeriCup is a 3x3 basketball tournament held annually since 2021 which features teams from the FIBA Americas zone competing for the 3x3 zone championship. The tournament is organized by the International Basketball Federation (FIBA). The debut of the tournament was held in August 2021 in Miami, USA. The current AmeriCup champions are United States in the men's division and Canada in the women's division.

== Men's tournament ==
=== Summary ===
Year	Host	Final			Third place match		
Year	Host	Champion	Score	Second place	Third place	Score	Fourth place
2021; Details	(United States); Miami	United States	21–15	Brazil	Dominican Republic	21–20	Puerto Rico
2022; Details	(United States); Miami	United States	21–18	Puerto Rico	Brazil	21–9	Trinidad and Tobago
2023; Details	(Puerto Rico); San Juan	Puerto Rico	18–14	Brazil	Dominican Republic	21–15	Mexico
2024; Details	(Puerto Rico); San Juan	United States	21–18	Puerto Rico	Canada	21–16	Dominican Republic
2025; Details	(Mexico); León	United States	21–15	Puerto Rico	Brazil	21–16	Canada
2026; Details	(El Salvador); San Salvador	United States	21–15	Canada	Puerto Rico	19–17	Brazil
2027; Details	(El Salvador)						

=== Medal table ===
Rank	Nation	Gold	Silver	Bronze	Total
1	United States	5	0	0	5
2	Puerto Rico	1	3	1	5
3	Brazil	0	2	2	4
4	Canada	0	1	1	2
5	Dominican Republic	0	0	2	2
Totals (5 entries)		6	6	6	18

=== Participating teams ===
Nation	(United States) 2021	(United States) 2022	(Puerto Rico) 2023	(Puerto Rico) 2024	(Mexico) 2025	(El Salvador) 2026	Total
Argentina	11th	9th	8th	9th	7th	5th	6
Brazil	2nd	3rd	2nd	6th	3rd	4th	6
Canada	5th	6th	7th	3rd	4th	2nd	6
Cayman Islands					12th		1
Chile	9th	7th	9th	5th	5th	7th	6
Colombia				12th			1
Dominican Republic	3rd	5th	3rd	4th	8th	10th	6
Ecuador			10th		11th		2
El Salvador						6th	1
Guatemala	12th	12th					2
Guyana		11th					1
Haiti			11th	10th			2
Jamaica	6th		12th	7th	9th		4
Mexico	7th	8th	4th	8th	6th	8th	6
Puerto Rico	4th	2nd	1st	2nd	2nd	3rd	6
Saint Lucia	8th	10th					2
Suriname						11th	1
Trinidad and Tobago		4th			10th	12th	3
Uruguay	10th		5th	11th			3
United States	1st	1st	6th	1st	1st	1st	6
Venezuela						9th	1
Total	12	12	12	12	12	12	

== Women's tournament ==
=== Summary ===
Year	Host	Final			Third place match		
Year	Host	Champion	Score	Second place	Third place	Score	Fourth place
2021; Details	(United States); Miami	United States	21–9	Brazil	Canada	18–12	Puerto Rico
2022; Details	(United States); Miami	Canada	15–11	Brazil	United States	17–13	Colombia
2023; Details	(Puerto Rico); San Juan	United States	21–20	Brazil	Canada	21–8	Chile
2024; Details	(Puerto Rico); San Juan	Canada	19–18 OT	United States	Brazil	17–16	Puerto Rico
2025; Details	(Mexico); León	United States	21–19	Canada	Brazil	21–14	Dominican Republic
2026; Details	(El Salvador); San Salvador	Canada	21–12	United States	Colombia	15–12	Cuba
2027; Details	(El Salvador)						

=== Medal table ===
Rank	Nation	Gold	Silver	Bronze	Total
1	United States	3	2	1	6
2	Canada	3	1	2	6
3	Brazil	0	3	2	5
4	Colombia	0	0	1	1
Totals (4 entries)		6	6	6	18

=== Participating teams ===
Nation	(United States) 2021	(United States) 2022	(Puerto Rico) 2023	(Puerto Rico) 2024	(Mexico) 2025	(El Salvador) 2026	Total
Argentina	8th	10th	9th	10th	8th	5th	6
Brazil	2nd	2nd	2nd	3rd	3rd		5
Canada	3rd	1st	3rd	1st	2nd	1st	6
Cayman Islands					12th	12th	2
Chile	5th	8th	4th	6th	11th	8th	6
Colombia		4th	12th	9th		3rd	4
Cuba				8th		4th	2
Dominican Republic	6th	6th	7th	5th	4th		5
Ecuador			8th				1
El Salvador						7th	1
Guatemala	10th	11th					2
Guyana	9th	12th					2
Jamaica		5th	6th	7th	9th		4
Mexico	7th		11th	11th	6th	10th	5
Paraguay					5th	6th	2
Puerto Rico	4th	7th	5th	4th	7th	9th	6
Trinidad and Tobago	12th	9th					2
Uruguay	11th		10th	12th			3
United States	1st	3rd	1st	2nd	1st	2nd	6
Venezuela					10th	11th	2
Total	12	12	12	12	12	12	

== Overall medal table ==
Rank	Nation	Gold	Silver	Bronze	Total
1	United States	8	2	1	11
2	Canada	3	2	3	8
3	Puerto Rico	1	3	1	5
4	Brazil	0	5	4	9
5	Dominican Republic	0	0	2	2
6	Colombia	0	0	1	1
Totals (6 entries)		12	12	12	36

== See also ==
- 3x3 basketball
- FIBA 3x3 World Cup
- Basketball at the 2024 Summer Olympics
- World Street 3s
