= Paraguay women's national 3x3 team =

National 3x3 basketball team

Paraguay
- FIBA zone: FIBA Americas
- National federation: Confederación Paraguaya de Basquetbol

AmeriCup
- Appearances: 2

The Paraguay women's national 3x3 team is a national basketball team of Paraguay, administered by the Confederación Paraguaya de Basquetbol. It represents the country in international 3x3 (3 against 3) basketball competitions.

== AmeriCup record ==
Year	Position	Pld	W	L
(United States) 2021 Miami	did not qualify			
(United States) 2022 Miami	did not qualify			
(Puerto Rico) 2023 San Juan	did not qualify			
(Puerto Rico) 2024 San Juan	did not qualify			
(Mexico) 2025 León	5th	3	2	1
(El Salvador) 2026 San Salvador	6th	3	1	2
Total	2/6	6	3	3
