= 2023 FIBA 3x3 World Cup – Women's tournament =

Basketball event

2023 FIBA 3x3 World Cup

Tournament details
- Host country: Austria
- City: Vienna
- Dates: 30 May – 4 June
- Teams: 20

Final positions
- Champions: United States (3rd title)
- Runners-up: France
- Third place: Australia
- Fourth place: China

Tournament statistics
- MVP: (United States) Cameron Brink

The 2023 FIBA 3x3 World Cup was held in Vienna, Austria from 30 May to 4 June 2023, and contested by 20 teams.

The United States win their third title, after defeated France in the final. While Australia captured bronze.

== Qualified teams ==
All five FIBA zones were represented. The top 20 teams, including the hosts, based on the FIBA National Federation ranking qualified for the tournament.

Competition	Dates	Host	Vacancies	Qualified
Host nation			1	Austria
2022 FIBA 3x3 Asia Cup	6–10 July 2022	Singapore	3	China; Japan; Mongolia
2022 FIBA 3x3 Europe Cup	9–11 September 2022	(Austria) Graz	9	France; Germany; Hungary; Italy; Lithuania; Netherlands; Poland; Romania; Spain
2022 FIBA 3x3 AmeriCup	4–6 November 2022	(United States) Miami	3	Brazil; Canada; United States
2022 FIBA 3x3 Africa Cup	3–4 December 2022	(Egypt) Cairo	1	Egypt
FIBA 3x3 World Cup Qualifier	6–7 May 2023	(Israel) Eilat	3	Australia; Czech Republic; Israel

== Players ==
Seed	Team	Players			
17	Austria	Anja Fuchs-Robetin	Camilla Neumann	Sarah Sagerer	Sigi Koizar
19	Australia	Anneli Maley	Lauren Mansfield	Alex Wilson	Marena Whittle
20	Brazil	Lays da Silva	Vanessa Sassá	Thayná Silva	Luana Batista
7	Canada	Kacie Bosch	Paige Crozon	Katherine Plouffe	Michelle Plouffe
4	China	Wan Jiyuan	Wang Lili	Zhang Yi	Zhang Zhiting
16	Czech Republic	Kateřina Galíčková	Alžběta Levínská	Anna Rylichová	Karolína Šotolová
15	Egypt	Hagar Amer	Raneem El-Gedawy	Soraya Mohamed	Nadine Mohamed
1	France	Myriam Djekoundade	Laëtitia Guapo	Hortense Limouzin	Marie-Ève Paget
2	Germany	Svenja Brunckhorst	Sonja Greinacher	Marie Reichert	Luana Rodefeld
13	Hungary	Vivi Böröndy	Janka Hegedűs	Klaudia Papp	Petra Pusztai
18	Israel	Drew Edelman	Hadar Hadad	Dor Saar	Nofar Shalom
14	Italy	Chiara Consolini	Rae Lin D'Alie	Beatrice Del Pero	Sara Madera
6	Japan	Yua Emura	Tamami Nakada	Nana Santa	Shizuka Takada
5	Lithuania	Giedrė Labuckienė	Gabija Meškonytė	Kamilė Nacickaitė	Gabrielė Šulskė
11	Mongolia	Bat-Erdeniin Ariuntsetseg	Mönkhsaikhany Tserenlkham	Onolbaataryn Khulan	Ölziibatyn Indra
8	Netherlands	Loyce Bettonvil	Kiki Fleuren	Julia Jorritsma	Natalie van den Adel
10	Poland	Dominika Fiszer	Klaudia Gertchen	Aldona Morawiec	Klaudia Sosnowska
12	Romania	Ecaterina Armanu	Teodora Manea	Alina Podar	Anamaria Vîrjoghe
9	Spain	Marta Canella	Vega Gimeno	Cecilia Muhate	Sandra Ygueravide
3	United States	Cameron Brink	Cierra Burdick	Linnae Harper	Hailey Van Lith

== Preliminary round ==
The pools were announced on 8 March 2023.

All times are local (UTC+2).

=== Pool A ===
Pos	Team	Pld	W	L	PF	PA	PR	Qualification
1	Austria (H)	4	3 (Note: France 10–13 Austria)	1	65	58	1.121	Quarterfinals
2	France	4	3	1	64	43	1.488	Round of 16
3	Spain	4	2	2	60	59	1.017	Round of 16
4	Brazil	4	1 (Note: Netherlands 19–20 Brazil)	3	66	78	0.846	
5	Netherlands	4	1	3	58	75	0.773	

Source: FIBA
Rules for classification: 1) Wins; 2) Head-to-head record; 3) Points scored.
(H) Hosts
Notes:

30 May 2023
17:10

Boxscore

Brazil	14–19	France
Pts: Silva 5		Pts: Guapo 10

Rathausplatz, Vienna
Referees: Marek Maliszewski (POL), Glenn Tuitt (USA)

30 May 2023
17:35

Boxscore

Austria	21–12	Netherlands
Pts: Sagerer 10		Pts: Van den Adel 5

Rathausplatz, Vienna
Referees: Cecília Tóth (HUN), Edmond Ho (HKG)

30 May 2023
19:20

Boxscore

Spain	8–14	France
Pts: Gimeno, Ygueravide 4		Pts: Guapo 8

Rathausplatz, Vienna
Referees: Edmond Ho (HKG), Cecília Tóth (HUN)

30 May 2023
19:45

Boxscore

Netherlands	19–20	Brazil
Pts: Fleuren 10		Pts: Da Silva 8

Rathausplatz, Vienna
Referees: Glenn Tuitt (USA), Marek Maliszewski (POL)

30 May 2023
21:40

Boxscore

Spain	18–12	Austria
Pts: Ygueravide 11		Pts: Koizar 6

Rathausplatz, Vienna
Referees: Glenn Tuitt (USA), Edmond Ho (HKG)

1 June 2023
17:10

Boxscore

Netherlands	19–13	Spain
Pts: Van den Adel 9		Pts: Canella, Gimeno 5

Rathausplatz, Vienna
Referees: Marek Maliszewski (POL), Cecília Tóth (HUN)

1 June 2023
17:35

Boxscore

Austria	19–18	Brazil
Pts: Sagerer 6		Pts: Silva 9

Rathausplatz, Vienna
Referees: Markos Michaelides (SUI), Glenn Tuitt (USA)

1 June 2023
19:20

Boxscore

France	21–8	Netherlands
Pts: Guapo 11		Pts: Van den Adel, Fleuren 3

Rathausplatz, Vienna
Referees: Cecília Tóth (HUN), Markos Michaelides (SUI)

1 June 2023
19:45

Boxscore

Brazil	14–21	Spain
Pts: Da Silva 7		Pts: Ygueravide 13

Rathausplatz, Vienna
Referees: Marek Maliszewski (POL), Glenn Tuitt (USA)

1 June 2023
21:40

Boxscore

France	10–13	Austria
Pts: Guapo 6		Pts: Koizar 5

Rathausplatz, Vienna
Referees: Glenn Tuitt (USA), Cecília Tóth (HUN)

=== Pool B ===
Pos	Team	Pld	W	L	PF	PA	PR	Qualification
1	Australia	4	3 (Note: Head-to-head: One win, one loss, ranked by points scored.)	1	84	57	1.474	Quarterfinals
2	Germany	4	3	1	80	67	1.194	Round of 16
3	Japan	4	3	1	74	71	1.042	Round of 16
4	Egypt	4	1	3	66	82	0.805	
5	Poland	4	0	4	54	81	0.667	

Source: FIBA
Rules for classification: 1) Wins; 2) Head-to-head record; 3) Points scored.
Notes:

31 May 2023
18:15

Boxscore

Japan	11–22	Australia
Pts: Takada 7		Pts: Whittle 10

Rathausplatz, Vienna
Referees: Cecília Tóth (HUN), Marek Maliszewski (POL)

31 May 2023
18:40

Boxscore

Poland	18–21	Egypt
Pts: Morawiec 6		Pts: Amer, Mohamed 6

Rathausplatz, Vienna
Referees: Su Yuyen (CHN), Markos Michaelides (SUI)

31 May 2023
20:25

Boxscore

Germany	20–21	Japan
Pts: Brunckhorst 10		Pts: Emura 13

Rathausplatz, Vienna
Referees: Su Yuyen (CHN), Cecília Tóth (HUN)

31 May 2023
20:50

Boxscore

Australia	21–14	Poland
Pts: Maley, Whittle 7		Pts: Morawiec 5

Rathausplatz, Vienna
Referees: Edmond Ho (HKG), Su Yuyen (CHN)

31 May 2023
22:05

Boxscore

Germany	21–16	Egypt
Pts: Rodefeld 9		Pts: El-Gedawy 7

Rathausplatz, Vienna
Referees: Edmond Ho (HKG), Su Yuyen (CHN)

2 June 2023
18:15

Boxscore

Poland	11–18	Germany
Pts: Gertchen 5		Pts: Brunckhorst, Rodefeld 6

Rathausplatz, Vienna
Referees: Su Yuyen (CHN), Cecília Tóth (HUN)

2 June 2023
18:40

Boxscore

Egypt	11–22	Australia
Pts: Mohamed 4		Pts: Whittle 14

Rathausplatz, Vienna
Referees: Su Yuyen (CHN), Donald Quinn (INA)

2 June 2023
20:15

Boxscore

Japan	21–11	Poland
Pts: Emura 18		Pts: Gertchen 6

Rathausplatz, Vienna
Referees: Cecília Tóth (HUN), Su Yuyen (CHN)

2 June 2023
20:40

Boxscore

Australia	19–21	Germany
Pts: Whittle 12		Pts: Greinacher 14

Rathausplatz, Vienna
Referees: Markos Michaelides (SUI), Donald Quinn (INA)

2 June 2023
21:45

Boxscore

Egypt	18–21	Japan
Pts: El-Gedawy 8		Pts: Emura 8

Rathausplatz, Vienna
Referees: Donald Quinn (INA), Su Yuyen (CHN)

=== Pool C ===
Pos	Team	Pld	W	L	PF	PA	PR	Qualification
1	Canada	4	3 (Note: Head-to-head: One win, one loss, ranked by points scored.)	1	76	53	1.434	Quarterfinals
2	United States	4	3	1	75	52	1.442	Round of 16
3	Czech Republic	4	3	1	66	63	1.048	Round of 16
4	Hungary	4	1	3	56	77	0.727	
5	Mongolia	4	0	4	56	84	0.667	

Source: FIBA
Rules for classification: 1) Wins; 2) Head-to-head record; 3) Points scored.
Notes:

30 May 2023
11:00

Boxscore

Canada	18–20 (OT)	Czech Republic
Pts: M. Plouffe 8		Pts: Galíčková 9

Rathausplatz, Vienna
Referees: Su Yuyen (CHN), Markos Michaelides (SUI)

30 May 2023
11:25

Boxscore

Mongolia	19–21	Hungary
Pts: Indra 12		Pts: Papp 10

Rathausplatz, Vienna
Referees: Su Yuyen (CHN), Jasmina Juras (SRB)

30 May 2023
13:00

Boxscore

United States	13–16	Canada
Pts: Harper 6		Pts: M. Plouffe 8

Rathausplatz, Vienna
Referees: Jasmina Juras (SRB), Donald Quinn (INA)

30 May 2023
13:25

Boxscore

Czech Republic	21–10	Mongolia
Pts: Galíčková 8		Pts: Indra 5

Rathausplatz, Vienna
Referees: Donald Quinn (INA), Su Yuyen (CHN)

30 May 2023
15:00

Boxscore

United States	20–10	Hungary
Pts: Harper 8		Pts: Papp 7

Rathausplatz, Vienna
Referees: Su Yuyen (CHN), Donald Quinn (INA)

1 June 2023
11:00

Boxscore

Mongolia	18–21	United States
Pts: Khulan 8		Pts: Van Lith 11

Rathausplatz, Vienna
Referees: Su Yuyen (CHN), Jasmina Juras (SRB)

1 June 2023
11:25

Boxscore

Hungary	14–17	Czech Republic
Pts: Papp 6		Pts: Galíčková 11

Rathausplatz, Vienna
Referees: Donald Quinn (INA), Edmond Ho (HKG)

1 June 2023
13:00

Boxscore

Canada	21–9	Mongolia
Pts: Crozon 11		Pts: Indra 5

Rathausplatz, Vienna
Referees: Su Yuyen (CHN), Donald Quinn (INA)

1 June 2023
13:25

Boxscore

Czech Republic	8–21	United States
Pts: Levínská 4		Pts: Brink 10

Rathausplatz, Vienna
Referees: Su Yuyen (CHN), Jasmina Juras (SRB)

1 June 2023
15:00

Boxscore

Hungary	11–21	Canada
Pts: Papp 7		Pts: M. Plouffe 8

Rathausplatz, Vienna
Referees: Su Yuyen (CHN), Donald Quinn (INA)

=== Pool D ===
Pos	Team	Pld	W	L	PF	PA	PR	Qualification
1	China	4	4	0	80	36	2.222	Quarterfinals
2	Israel	4	3	1	61	65	0.938	Round of 16
3	Italy	4	2	2	78	78	1.000	Round of 16
4	Lithuania	4	1	3	59	67	0.881	
5	Romania	4	0	4	47	79	0.595	

Source: FIBA
Rules for classification: 1) Wins; 2) Head-to-head record; 3) Points scored.

31 May 2023
11:00

Boxscore

China	21–4	Israel
Pts: Wang 12		Pts: four players 1

Rathausplatz, Vienna
Referees: Marek Maliszewski (POL), Jasmina Juras (SRB)

31 May 2023
11:25

Boxscore

Romania	15–20	Italy
Pts: Vîrjoghe 6		Pts: D'Alie 9

Rathausplatz, Vienna
Referees: Donald Quinn (INA), Glenn Tuitt (USA)

31 May 2023
13:00

Boxscore

Lithuania	7–17	China
Pts: Nacickaitė 4		Pts: Wan 8

Rathausplatz, Vienna
Referees: Jasmina Juras (SRB), Donald Quinn (INA)

31 May 2023
13:25

Boxscore

Israel	21–12	Romania
Pts: Edelman 11		Pts: Podar 8

Rathausplatz, Vienna
Referees: Marek Maliszewski (POL), Glenn Tuitt (USA)

31 May 2023
15:00

Boxscore

Lithuania	21–22 (OT)	Italy
Pts: Šulskė 7		Pts: D'Alie 10

Rathausplatz, Vienna
Referees: Donald Quinn (INA), Glenn Tuitt (USA)

2 June 2023
11:00

Boxscore

China	21–7	Romania
Pts: Wan 9		Pts: Podar 5

Rathausplatz, Vienna
Referees: Glenn Tuitt (USA), Marek Maliszewski (POL)

2 June 2023
11:25

Boxscore

Israel	15–14	Lithuania
Pts: Hadad, Saar 6		Pts: Nacickaitė 6

Rathausplatz, Vienna
Referees: Jasmina Juras (SRB), Marek Maliszewski (POL)

2 June 2023
13:00

Boxscore

Italy	18–21	China
Pts: Del Pero, Madera 6		Pts: Wang 10

Rathausplatz, Vienna
Referees: Jasmina Juras (SRB), Glenn Tuitt (USA)

2 June 2023
13:25

Boxscore

Romania	13–17	Lithuania
Pts: Vîrjoghe 7		Pts: Nacickaitė 7

Rathausplatz, Vienna
Referees: Jasmina Juras (SRB), Marek Maliszewski (POL)

2 June 2023
15:00

Boxscore

Italy	18–21	Israel
Pts: Madera 6		Pts: Edelman 9

Rathausplatz, Vienna
Referees: Glenn Tuitt (USA), Marek Maliszewski (POL)

== Knockout stage ==
=== Bracket ===
Round of 16
United States	22
Japan	17
Germany	19
Czech Republic	16
France	17
Italy	11
Israel	11
Spain	21

Quarter-finals
Austria	17
United States	21
Germany	14
China	17
Canada	13
France	14
Spain	10
Australia	21

Semi-finals
United States	20
China	12
France	21
Australia	17

Final
United States	16
France	12
Third place
China	20
Australia	21

=== Round of 16 ===
3 June 2023
13:00

Boxscore

United States	22–17	Japan
Pts: Van Lith 9		Pts: Emura 12

Rathausplatz, Vienna
Referees: Su Yuyen (CHN), Jasmina Juras (SRB)

3 June 2023
13:25

Boxscore

Germany	19–16	Czech Republic
Pts: Greinacher 9		Pts: Galíčková 8

Rathausplatz, Vienna
Referees: Glenn Tuitt (USA), Marek Maliszewski (POL)

3 June 2023
15:10

Boxscore

Israel	11–21	Spain
Pts: Edelman, Saar 4		Pts: Gimeno 9

Rathausplatz, Vienna
Referees: Su Yuyen (CHN), Cecília Tóth (HUN)

3 June 2023
15:35

Boxscore

France	17–11	Italy
Pts: Djekoundade 7		Pts: Madera 5

Rathausplatz, Vienna
Referees: Markos Michaelides (SUI), Donald Quinn (INA)

=== Quarterfinals ===
3 June 2023
18:20

Boxscore

Spain	10–21	Australia
Pts: three players 3		Pts: Whittle 9

Rathausplatz, Vienna
Referees: Glenn Tuitt (USA), Edmond Ho (HKG)

3 June 2023
18:45

Boxscore

Canada	13–14	France
Pts: K. Plouffe 8		Pts: Guapo 6

Rathausplatz, Vienna
Referees: Markos Michaelides (SUI), Su Yuyen (CHN)

3 June 2023
20:20

Boxscore

Germany	14–17	China
Pts: three players 4		Pts: Zhang 7

Rathausplatz, Vienna
Referees: Donald Quinn (INA), Marek Maliszewski (POL)

3 June 2023
20:45

Boxscore

Austria	17–21	United States
Pts: Robetin, Sagerer 5		Pts: Van Lith 8

Rathausplatz, Vienna
Referees: Jasmina Juras (SRB), Cecília Tóth (HUN)

=== Semifinals ===
4 June 2023
14:30

Boxscore

United States	20–12	China
Pts: Brink 8		Pts: Wang 6

Rathausplatz, Vienna
Referees: Donald Quinn (INA), Marek Maliszewski (POL)

4 June 2023
14:55

Boxscore

France	21–17	Australia
Pts: Paget 11		Pts: Whittle 7

Rathausplatz, Vienna
Referees: Glenn Tuitt (USA), Edmond Ho (HKG)

=== Third place game ===
4 June 2023
16:50

Boxscore

China	20–21	Australia
Pts: Wang 9		Pts: Whittle 11

Rathausplatz, Vienna
Referees: Markos Michaelides (SUI), Donald Quinn (INA)

=== Final ===
4 June 2023
18:00

Boxscore

United States	16–12	France
Pts: Burdick, Van Lith 7		Pts: Limouzin 5

Rathausplatz, Vienna
Referees: Jasmina Juras (SRB), Markos Michaelides (SUI)

== Final standings ==
Rank	Team	Record
1st place, gold medalist(s)	United States	7–1
2nd place, silver medalist(s)	France	6–2
3rd place, bronze medalist(s)	Australia	5–2
4	China	5–2
5	Germany	4–2
6	Canada	3–2
7	Austria	3–2
8	Spain	3–3
9	Japan	3–2
10	Czech Republic	3–2
11	Israel	3–2
12	Italy	2–3
13	Egypt	1–3
14	Brazil	1–3
15	Lithuania	1–3
16	Netherlands	1–3
17	Hungary	1–3
18	Mongolia	0–4
19	Poland	0–4
20	Romania	0–4

== Awards ==
2023 FIBA 3x3 World Champions – Women's

United States
3rd title

=== Individual ===
Most Valuable Player

- (United States) Cameron Brink

Team of the Tournament

- (United States) Cameron Brink
- (France) Laëtitia Guapo
- (Australia) Marena Whittle

Top scorers

Name	Points
(Australia) Marena Whittle	70
(China) Wang Lili	46
(France) Laëtitia Guapo	45
(United States) Hailey Van Lith	44
(Japan) Yua Emura	42
