= Chile women's national 3x3 team =

National 3x3 basketball team

Chile
- FIBA ranking: 27
- FIBA zone: FIBA Americas
- National federation: Chile Basketball Federation

World Cup
- Appearances: 2

AmeriCup
- Appearances: 6
Home	Away

The Chile women's national 3x3 basketball team is the basketball side that represents Chile in international 3x3 basketball (3 against 3) competitions. It is organized and run by the Federación de Básquetbol de Chile.

== Tournament record ==
=== World Cup ===
Year	Position	Pld	W	L
(Greece) 2012 Athens	Did not qualify			
(Russia) 2014 Moscow	Did not qualify			
(China) 2016 Guangzhou	Did not qualify			
(France) 2017 Nantes	Did not qualify			
(Philippines) 2018 Bocaue	Did not qualify			
(Netherlands) 2019 Amsterdam	Did not qualify			
(Belgium) 2022 Antwerp	14th	4	1	3
(Austria) 2023 Vienna	Did not qualify			
(Mongolia) 2025 Ulaanbaatar	19th	4	0	4
(Poland) 2026 Warsaw	Did not qualify			
2027 Singapore	To be determined			
Total	2/9	8	1	7

=== Pan American Games ===
Year	Position	Pld	W	L
(Peru) 2019 Lima	did not qualify			
(Chile) 2023 Santiago	3rd	5	3	2

=== AmeriCup ===
Year	Position	Pld	W	L
(United States) 2021 Miami	5th	3	2	1
(United States) 2022 Miami	8th	3	1	2
(Puerto Rico) 2023 San Juan	4th	5	2	3
(Puerto Rico) 2024 San Juan	6th	3	1	2
(Mexico) 2025 León	11th	2	0	2
(El Salvador) 2026 San Salvador	8th	3	1	2
Total	6/6	19	7	12
