= Argentina women's national 3x3 team =

National 3x3 basketball team

Argentina
- FIBA zone: FIBA Americas

World Cup
- Appearances: 5

Pan American Games
- Appearances: 2
- Medals: Silver: (2019)

AmeriCup
- Appearances: 6

The Argentina women's national 3x3 team is a national basketball team of Argentina, governed by the Confederación Argentina de Basquetbol. It represents the country in international 3x3 (3 against 3) women's basketball competitions.

== Tournament record ==
=== World Cup ===
Year	Position	Pld	W	L
(Greece) 2012 Athens	11th	6	3	3
(Russia) 2014 Moscow	10th	6	3	3
(China) 2016 Guangzhou	8th	5	3	2
(France) 2017 Nantes	11th	4	2	2
(Philippines) 2018 Bocaue	16th	4	1	3
(Netherlands) 2019 Amsterdam	did not qualify			
(Belgium) 2022 Antwerp	did not qualify			
(Austria) 2023 Vienna	did not qualify			
(Mongolia) 2025 Ulaanbaatar	did not qualify			
(Poland) 2026 Warsaw	did not qualify			
2027 Singapore	To be determined			
Total	5/11	25	12	13

=== AmeriCup ===
Year	Position	Pld	W	L
(United States) 2021 Miami	8th	3	1	2
(United States) 2022 Miami	10th	2	0	2
(Puerto Rico) 2023 San Juan	9th	2	1	1
(Puerto Rico) 2024 San Juan	10th	2	0	2
(Mexico) 2025 León	8th	3	1	2
(El Salvador) 2026 San Salvador	5th	3	2	1
Total	6/6	15	5	10

== See also ==
- Argentina men's national 3x3 team
- Argentina mixed national 3x3 team
