= Cayman Islands women's national 3x3 team =

Cayman Islands
- FIBA zone: FIBA Americas
- National federation: Cayman Islands Basketball Association

AmeriCup
- Appearances: 2

The Cayman Islands women's national 3x3 team is a national basketball team of Cayman Islands, administered by the Cayman Islands Basketball Association. It represents the country in international 3x3 (3 against 3) basketball competitions.

== AmeriCup record ==
Year	Position	Pld	W	L
(United States) 2021 Miami	did not qualify			
(United States) 2022 Miami	did not qualify			
(Puerto Rico) 2023 San Juan	did not qualify			
(Puerto Rico) 2024 San Juan	did not qualify			
(Mexico) 2025 León	12th	2	0	2
(El Salvador) 2026 San Salvador	12th	2	0	2
Total	2/6	6	3	3
