= Canada women's national 3x3 team =

National 3x3 basketball team

Canada
- FIBA ranking: 5
- FIBA zone: FIBA Americas
- National federation: Canada Basketball
- Coach: Kim Gaucher

Olympic Games
- Appearances: 1

World Cup
- Appearances: 4
- Medals: Silver (2022); Bronze (2025)

AmeriCup
- Appearances: 6
- Medals: Gold (2022, 2024, 2026); Silver: (2025); Bronze: (2021, 2023)
Medal record
Women's 3x3 basketball
Representing Canada
World Cup
Silver medal – second place	2022 Belgium	Team
Bronze medal – third place	2025 Mongolia	Team
AmeriCup
Gold medal – first place	2022 United States
Gold medal – first place	2024 San Juan
Gold medal – first place	2024 San Salvador
Silver medal – second place	2025 León
Bronze medal – third place	2021 Miami
Bronze medal – third place	2023 San Juan

The Canada women's national 3x3 basketball team represents Canada in international 3x3 basketball (3 vs 3) competitions. They are overseen by Canada Basketball, the governing body of basketball in Canada.

== Competitive record ==
=== Summer Olympics ===
Year	Position	Pld	W	L	Players
(Japan) 2020 Tokyo	did not qualify				
(France) 2024 Paris	4th	10	5	5	M. Plouffe, K. Plouffe, Crozon, Bosch
Total	1/2	10	5	5	

=== FIBA 3x3 World Cup ===
Year	Position	Pld	W	L
(Greece) 2012 Athens	did not qualify			
(Russia) 2014 Moscow	did not qualify			
(China) 2016 Guangzhou	did not qualify			
(France) 2017 Nantes	did not qualify			
(Philippines) 2018 Bocaue	did not qualify			
(Netherlands) 2019 Amsterdam	did not qualify			
(Belgium) 2022 Antwerp	2nd	8	6	2
(Austria) 2023 Vienna	6th	5	3	2
(Mongolia) 2025 Ulaanbaatar	3rd	8	5	3
(Poland) 2026 Warsaw	14th	4	2	2
2027 Singapore	To be determined			
Total	4/11	25	16	9

=== FIBA 3x3 AmeriCup ===
Year	Position	Pld	W	L
(United States) 2021 Miami	3rd	5	4	1
(United States) 2022 Miami	1st	5	4	1
(Puerto Rico) 2023 San Juan	3rd	5	3	2
(Puerto Rico) 2024 San Juan	1st	5	5	0
(Mexico) 2025 León	2nd	5	4	1
(El Salvador) 2026 San Salvador	1st	5	5	0
Total	6/6	30	25	5

=== Champions Cup ===
Year	Position	Pld	W	L
(Thailand) 2025 Bangkok	1st	5	5	0
(Thailand) 2026 Bangkok	4th	5	3	2
Total	2/2	10	8	2

== See also ==
- Canada women's national basketball team
