= United States women's national 3x3 team =

USA Women's 3x3 Team

United States
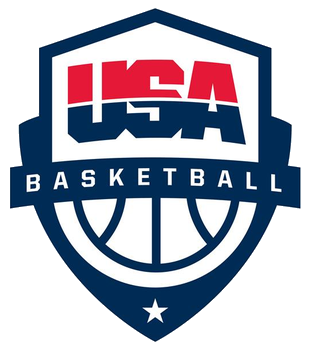
- FIBA ranking: 7
- FIBA zone: FIBA Americas
- National federation: USA Basketball

Olympic Games
- Appearances: 2
- Medals: Gold: (2020); Bronze: (2024)

World Cup
- Appearances: 8
- Medals: Gold: (2012, 2014, 2023, 2026); Bronze: (2016)

Pan American Games
- Appearances: 2
- Medals: Gold: (2019, 2023)

AmeriCup
- Appearances: 6
- Medals: Gold: (2021, 2023, 2025); Silver: (2024, 2026); Bronze: (2022)
Medal record
Olympic Games
| Gold medal – first place | 2020 Tokyo | Team |
| Bronze medal – third place | 2024 Paris | Team |
World Cup
| Gold medal – first place | 2012 Greece |
| Gold medal – first place | 2014 Russia | Team |
| Gold medal – first place | 2023 Vienna | Team |
| Gold medal – first place | 2026 Warsaw | Team |
| Bronze medal – third place | 2016 China | Team |
Pan American Games
| Gold medal – first place | 2019 Lima | Team |
| Gold medal – first place | 2023 Santiago | Team |
AmeriCup
| Gold medal – first place | 2021 Miami |
| Gold medal – first place | 2023 San Juan |
| Gold medal – first place | 2025 León |
| Silver medal – second place | 2024 San Juan |
| Silver medal – second place | 2026 San Salvador |
| Bronze medal – third place | 2022 Miami |

The USA Women's 3x3 Teams are two of the 3x3 basketball teams under the auspices of the USA Basketball organization. In 2007, FIBA decided to start championships for the 3x3 event (also called three-on-three), starting in 2010. The open events are held every other year, in even-numbered years, starting in 2012.

== History ==
=== 2020 Olympics ===
The Olympic event in 2021 was held as part of the 2020 Olympic Games held in Tokyo, Japan, July 24–28, 2021.

The players for the USA team were:

- Stefanie Dolson
- Allisha Gray
- Kelsey Plum
- Jackie Young

Young was a late replacement to the team after Katie Lou Samuelson contracted COVID-19 just prior to the start of the games. The team won all but one game in pool play to take a 6–1 record into the knock-out round. They beat France in the semi-final 18–16, which set up the gold medal match against ROC. The USA team won that match 18–15 to win the first ever gold medal at an Olympic Games 3x3 basketball tournament.

=== 2012 World Cup ===
The first FIBA 3x3 World Championship For Women was held in Athens, Greece, August 23–26, 2012. The original team chosen to represent the USA included:

- Skylar Diggins
- Bria Hartley
- Chiney Ogwumike
- Alyssa Thomas

However, Thomas was unable to compete, so she was replaced by Ann Strother Strother was in nursing school. but had participated in the 3x3 tournament on a different team. She had planned a vacation for the time period of the world tournament, so was able to accept the request to play as a replacement player.

The USA won their first five games easily to advance to the knockout round. They then defeated Estonia to move into the quarterfinals with Hungary. They defeated Hungary easily and faced Australia in the semi-final. The Aussies gave them their toughest challenge to date, but the USA team held on to win 19–18. They faced France in the goal medal game and fell behind, but came back to win a close game 17–16 to win the first ever gold medal in the 3x3 open event.

=== 2014 World Cup ===
The second FIBA 3x3 World Championship For Women was held in Moscow, Russia, June 5–8, 2015. The players for the USA team were:

- Cierra Burdick
- Sara Hammond
- Jewell Loyd
- Tiffany Mitchell

The USA team started pool play strong, winning each of the first five games by at least a 10-point margin. Only Argentina and Spain were within ten points. The USA then defeated Uruguay 19–6 to earn a place in the medal rounds. France proved to be a tough opponent, but the USA team prevailed 12–9. In the semi-final game, USA faced Belgium and came away with the win, 18–14. The gold medal game was against the host team, Russia, and the USA won 15–8 to finish undefeated and take home the gold medal.

=== 2018 World Cup ===
The 2018 World Cup was held in Bocaue, Philippines from June 8–12, 2018. Team USA won Group C, but lost their quarterfinal game to Italy. They would finish in 5th place.

For this event, Team USA consists of four University of Oregon players who had won the 2018 US open women's championship that April:

- Erin Boley
- Otiona Gildon
- Ruthy Hebard
- Sabrina Ionescu

== Tournament record ==
=== Olympic Games ===
| Year | Result | Position | Pld | W | L | Players |
|---|---|---|---|---|---|---|
| (Japan) 2020 Tokyo | Gold medalists | 1st | 9 | 8 | 1 | Dolson, Gray, Plum, Young |
| (France) 2024 Paris | Bronze medalists | 3rd | 10 | 6 | 4 | Burdick, Hamby, Howard, Van Lith |
| Total | 1 Title | 2/2 | 19 | 14 | 5 | |

=== World Cup ===
| Year | Result | Position | Pld | W | L | Players |
|---|---|---|---|---|---|---|
| (Greece) 2012 Athens | Champions | 1st | 9 | 9 | 0 | |
| (Russia) 2014 Moscow | Champions | 1st | 9 | 9 | 0 | |
| (China) 2016 Guangzhou | Third place | 3rd | 7 | 5 | 2 | |
| (France) 2017 Nantes | Did not qualify | | | | | |
| (Philippines) 2018 Bocaue | Quarter-finals | 5th | 5 | 4 | 1 | Boley, Gildon, Hebard, Ionescu |
| (Netherlands) 2019 Amsterdam | Did not qualify | | | | | |
| (Belgium) 2022 Antwerp | Quarter-finals | 7th | 5 | 4 | 1 | Burdick, Cox, Joens, Van Lith |
| (Austria) 2023 Vienna | Champions | 1st | 8 | 7 | 1 | Brink, Burdick, Harper, Van Lith |
| (Mongolia) 2025 Ulaanbaatar | Quarter-finals | 6th | 5 | 4 | 1 | Maly, Strong, M. Williams, S. Williams |
| (Poland) 2026 Warsaw | Champions | 1st | 7 | 7 | 0 | Edwards, Fulwiley, M. Williams, S. Williams |
| 2027 Singapore | To be determined | | | | | |
| Total | 4 Titles | 8/11 | 55 | 49 | 6 | |

=== Pan American Games ===
| Year | Result | Position | Pld | W | L | Players |
|---|---|---|---|---|---|---|
| (Peru) 2019 Lima | Gold medalists | 1st | 7 | 7 | 0 | Hebard, Ionescu, Nelson-Ododa, Williams |
| (Chile) 2023 Santiago | Gold medalists | 1st | 5 | 5 | 0 | Burdick, Dietrick, Hull, Stevens |
| Total | 2 Titles | 2/2 | 12 | 12 | 0 | |

=== AmeriCup ===
| Year | Result | Position | Pld | W | L | Players |
|---|---|---|---|---|---|---|
| (United States) 2021 Miami | Champions | 1st | 5 | 5 | 0 | |
| (United States) 2022 Miami | Third place | 3rd | 5 | 4 | 1 | |
| (Puerto Rico) 2023 San Juan | Champions | 1st | 5 | 5 | 0 | |
| (Puerto Rico) 2024 San Juan | Runners-up | 2nd | 5 | 4 | 1 | |
| (Mexico) 2025 León | Champions | 1st | 5 | 5 | 0 | |
| (El Salvador) 2026 San Salvador | Runners-up | 2nd | 5 | 4 | 1 | |
| Total | 3 Titles | 6/6 | 30 | 27 | 3 | |

=== Champions Cup ===
| Year | Result | Position | Pld | W | L |
|---|---|---|---|---|---|
| (Thailand) 2025 Bangkok | Did not qualify | | | | |
| (Thailand) 2026 Bangkok | Third place | 3rd | 5 | 4 | 1 |
| Total | 0 Title | 1/2 | 5 | 4 | 1 |

== See also ==
- USA Basketball
- United States women's national basketball team
- United States women's national under-19 basketball team
- United States women's national under-17 basketball team
- United States men's national 3x3 team
- 3x3 basketball
