= Brazil women's national 3x3 team =

National 3x3 basketball team

Brazil
- FIBA ranking: 32
- Joined FIBA: 1935
- FIBA zone: FIBA Americas
- National federation: CBB

World Cup
- Appearances: 5

AmeriCup
- Appearances: 5
- Medals: (silver) (2021, 2022, 2023) (bronze) (2024, 2025)
Home	Away

The Brazilian women's national 3x3 team (Portuguese: Seleção Brasileira Feminina de 3x3) represents Brazil in international 3x3 basketball matches and is controlled by the Confederação Brasileira de Basketball (Brazilian Basketball Confederation) – abbreviated as CBB.

== Tournament record ==
=== World Cup ===
Year	Position	Pld	W	L
(Greece) 2012 Athens	18th	5	1	4
(Russia) 2014 Moscow	15th	6	2	4
(China) 2016 Guangzhou	Did not qualify			
(France) 2017 Nantes	Did not qualify			
(Philippines) 2018 Bocaue	Did not qualify			
(Netherlands) 2019 Amsterdam	Did not qualify			
(Belgium) 2022 Antwerp	11th	5	2	3
(Austria) 2023 Vienna	14th	4	1	3
(Mongolia) 2025 Ulaanbaatar	14th	4	1	3
(Poland) 2026 Warsaw	To be determined			
2027 Singapore	To be determined			
Total	5/9	24	7	17

=== AmeriCup ===
Year	Position	Pld	W	L
(United States) 2021 Miami	2nd place, silver medalist(s)	5	4	1
(United States) 2022 Miami	2nd place, silver medalist(s)	5	4	1
(Puerto Rico) 2023 San Juan	2nd place, silver medalist(s)	5	4	1
(Puerto Rico) 2024 San Juan	3rd place, bronze medalist(s)	5	4	1
(Mexico) 2025 León	3rd place, bronze medalist(s)	5	3	2
Total	5/5	25	20	5

== See also ==
- Brazil women's national basketball team
- Brazil men's national 3x3 team
