= 2024 FIBA 3x3 AmeriCup – Women's tournament =

Tournament details
- Host country: Puerto Rico
- City: San Juan
- Dates: 13–15 December
- Teams: 15
- Venue: Distrito T-Mobile

Final positions
- Champions: Canada (2nd title)
- Runners-up: United States
- Third place: Brazil
- Fourth place: Puerto Rico

Tournament statistics
- MVP: (Canada) Paige Crozon

The 2024 FIBA 3x3 AmeriCup – Women's tournament is the fourth edition of this continental championship. The event was held in San Juan, Puerto Rico for the second consecutive time. It was contested by 15 teams from all over the American continent.

United States are the defending champions.

Canada won their second title after beating United States in the final.

== Host selection ==
Puerto Rico's capital, San Juan, was given the hosting rights on 14 January 2024 after the director of the Puerto Rican 3x3 program renewed the contract after a successful 2023 edition. This marks the second straight time that Puerto Rico is hosting the event.

== Venue ==
The venue is the Distrito T-Mobile in San Juan.

== Participating teams ==
All National Federations in the Americas region were invited to register a team for the 2024 FIBA 3x3 AmeriCup.

Preliminary round

Pool A

- United States (1)
- Uruguay (8)
- Dominican Republic (9)

Pool B

- Canada (2)
- Mexico (7)
- Jamaica (10)

Pool C

- Chile (3)
- Brazil (6)
- Colombia (11)

Pool D

- Puerto Rico (4)
- Argentina (5)
- Qualifier

Qualifying draw

Pool A

- Guatemala (12)
- Costa Rica (13)
- Cayman Islands (14)
- Cuba (15)

== Qualifying draw ==
The group winner qualifies for the next round.

=== Pool A ===
Pos	Team	Pld	W	L	PF	PA	PD	Qualification	(Cuba)	(Guatemala)	(Costa Rica)	(Cayman Islands)
1	Cuba	3	2	1	59	35	+24	Preliminary round				21–5
2	Guatemala	3	2	1	56	35	+21		22–17		14–16 OT	
3	Costa Rica	3	2	1	42	37	+5		8–21			18–2
4	Cayman Islands	3	0	3	9	61	−52			2–22		

Source: FIBA
Rules for classification: 1) Wins; 2) Head-to-head record; 3) Points scored.

== Preliminary round ==
=== Pool A ===
Pos	Team	Pld	W	L	PF	PA	PD	Qualification	(United States)	(Dominican Republic)	(Uruguay)
1	United States	2	2	0	42	18	+24	Quarter-finals		21–14	21–4
2	Dominican Republic	2	1	1	30	32	−2	Quarter-finals			
3	Uruguay	2	0	2	15	37	−22			11–16	

Source: FIBA
Rules for classification: 1) Wins; 2) Head-to-head record; 3) Points scored.

=== Pool B ===
Pos	Team	Pld	W	L	PF	PA	PD	Qualification	(Canada)	(Jamaica)	(Mexico)
1	Canada	2	2	0	41	21	+20	Quarter-finals		20–15	21–6
2	Jamaica	2	1	1	29	29	0	Quarter-finals			
3	Mexico	2	0	2	15	35	−20			9–14	

Source: FIBA
Rules for classification: 1) Wins; 2) Head-to-head record; 3) Points scored.

=== Pool C ===
Pos	Team	Pld	W	L	PF	PA	PD	Qualification	(Brazil)	(Chile)	(Colombia)
1	Brazil	2	2	0	40	20	+20	Quarter-finals			19–11
2	Chile	2	1	1	30	33	−3	Quarter-finals	9–21		21–12
3	Colombia	2	0	2	23	40	−17				

Source: FIBA
Rules for classification: 1) Wins; 2) Head-to-head record; 3) Points scored.

=== Pool D ===
Pos	Team	Pld	W	L	PF	PA	PD	Qualification	(Puerto Rico)	(Cuba)	(Argentina)
1	Puerto Rico (H)	2	2	0	29	23	+6	Quarter-finals		15–10	14–13 OT
2	Cuba	2	1	1	23	24	−1	Quarter-finals			
3	Argentina	2	0	2	22	27	−5			9–13	

Source: FIBA
Rules for classification: 1) Wins; 2) Head-to-head record; 3) Points scored.
(H) Hosts

== Knockout stage ==
Quarter-finals
15 Dec 2024
United States	18
Chile	11
15 Dec 2024
Puerto Rico	12
Jamaica	11
15 Dec 2024
Canada	21
Cuba	12
15 Dec 2024
Brazil	22
Dominican Republic	14

Semi-finals
15 Dec 2024
United States	21
Puerto Rico	8
15 Dec 2024
Canada	18
Brazil	11

Final
15 Dec 2024
United States	18
Canada	19 OT
Bronze medal
15 Dec 2024
Puerto Rico	16
Brazil	17

== Final standings ==
Pos	Team	Pld	W	L	PF	PA	PD
1	Canada	5	5	0	99	62	+37
2	United States	5	4	1	99	56	+43
3	Brazil	5	4	1	90	68	+22
4	Puerto Rico	5	3	2	65	72	-7
5	Dominican Republic	3	1	2	44	46	-2
6	Chile	3	1	2	41	51	-10
7	Jamaica	3	1	2	40	41	-1
8	Cuba	6	3	3	94	80	+14
9	Colombia	2	0	2	23	40	–17
10	Argentina	2	0	2	22	27	–5
11	Mexico	2	0	2	15	35	-20
12	Uruguay	2	0	2	15	37	-22

Eliminated in the qualifying draw

Pos	Team	Pld	W	L	PF	PA	PD
13	Guatemala	3	2	1	56	35	+21
14	Costa Rica	3	2	1	42	37	-5
15	Cayman Islands	3	0	3	9	61	–52

== Awards ==
These players were given the awards after the competition:

=== Most valuable player ===
- (Canada) Paige Crozon

=== Top scorer ===
- (Canada) Paige Crozon (46 points)

=== Team of the tournament ===
- (Canada) Paige Crozon
- (United States) Brittney Sykes
- (Brazil) Gabriela Soares

== See also ==
- 2024 FIBA 3x3 AmeriCup – Men's tournament
- 2024 FIBA 3x3 Europe Cup – Men's tournament
- 2024 FIBA 3x3 Europe Cup – Women's tournament
- 2024 FIBA 3x3 Asia Cup – Men's tournament
- 2024 FIBA 3x3 Asia Cup – Women's tournament
- 2024 FIBA 3x3 Africa Cup – Men's tournament
- 2024 FIBA 3x3 Africa Cup – Women's tournament
