= 2027 FIBA 3x3 AmeriCup – Men's tournament =

Tournament details
- Host country: El Salvador
- Venue: 1

The 2027 FIBA 3x3 AmeriCup – Men's tournament will be the seventh edition of the FIBA 3x3 AmeriCup, the annual international 3x3 basketball championship organised under the auspices of FIBA Americas for women's national teams in the Americas.

The tournament will take place in El Salvador.
