= Puerto Rico women's national 3x3 team =

National 3x3 basketball team

Puerto Rico
- FIBA zone: FIBA Americas
- National federation: Federación de Baloncesto de Puerto Rico

AmeriCup
- Appearances: 6

The Puerto Rico women's national 3x3 team is a national basketball team of Puerto Rico, administered by the Federación de Baloncesto de Puerto Rico. It represents the country in international 3x3 (3 against 3) basketball competitions.

== AmeriCup record ==
Year	Position	Pld	W	L
(United States) 2021 Miami	4th	5	2	3
(United States) 2022 Miami	7th	3	1	2
(Puerto Rico) 2023 San Juan	5th	3	2	1
(Puerto Rico) 2024 San Juan	4th	5	3	2
(Mexico) 2025 León	7th	3	1	2
(El Salvador) 2026 San Salvador	9th	2	0	2
Total	6/6	21	9	12
