= 2025 FIBA 3x3 AmeriCup – Women's tournament =

Tournament details
- Host country: Mexico
- City: León
- Dates: 27–30 November
- Teams: 14
- Venue: Templo Expiatorio

Final positions
- Champions: United States (3rd title)
- Runners-up: Canada
- Third place: Brazil
- Fourth place: Dominican Republic

Tournament statistics
- MVP: (United States) Allisha Gray

The 2025 FIBA 3x3 AmeriCup was the fifth edition of this continental championship. The event was held in León, Mexico from 27 to 30 November 2025. It was contested by 14 teams from all over the American continent.

The United States won their third title, after defeated Canada 21–19 in the final.

== Host selection ==
San Juan, Mexico was given the hosting rights on 6 June 2025, marking the first time this tournament will be hosted in the country.

== Venue ==
The event will be held in León, in front of the Templo Expiatorio.

== Participating teams ==
All National Federations in the Americas region were invited to register a team for the 2024 FIBA 3x3 AmeriCup.

Preliminary round

Pool A

- Canada (1)
- Cayman Islands (8)
- Dominican Republic (9)

Pool B

- United States (2)
- Brazil (7)
- Jamaica (10)

Pool C

- Puerto Rico (3)
- Mexico (6)
- Qualifier

Pool D

- Chile (4)
- Argentina (5)
- Qualifier

Qualifying draw

Pool A

- Uruguay (12)
- Venezuela (13)
- Ecuador (14)
- Paraguay (15)

== Qualifying draw ==
The two teams qualified for the next round.

=== Pool QD A ===
Pos	Team	Pld	W	L	PF	PA	PD	Qualification	(Venezuela)	(Paraguay)	(Uruguay)	(Ecuador)
1	Venezuela	3	3	0	51	43	+8	Preliminary round		18–12		15–14
2	Paraguay	3	2	1	54	35	+19	Preliminary round				21–9
3	Uruguay	3	1	2	42	55	−13		17–18	8–21		
4	Ecuador	3	0	3	39	53	−14				6–17	

Source: FIBA
Rules for classification: 1) Wins; 2) Head-to-head record; 3) Points scored.

== Preliminary round ==
=== Pool A ===
Pos	Team	Pld	W	L	PF	PA	PD	Qualification	(Canada)	(Dominican Republic)	(Cayman Islands)
1	Canada	2	2	0	43	13	+30	Knockout stage		22–10	21–3
2	Dominican Republic	2	1	1	31	26	+5	Knockout stage			
3	Cayman Islands	2	0	2	7	42	−35			4–21	

Source: FIBA
Rules for classification: 1) Wins; 2) Head-to-head record; 3) Points scored.

=== Pool B ===
Pos	Team	Pld	W	L	PF	PA	PD	Qualification	(United States)	(Brazil)	(Jamaica)
1	United States	2	2	0	42	25	+17	Knockout stage		21–10	21–15
2	Brazil	2	1	1	28	33	−5	Knockout stage			18–12
3	Jamaica	2	0	2	27	39	−12				

Source: FIBA
Rules for classification: 1) Wins; 2) Head-to-head record; 3) Points scored.

=== Pool C ===
Pos	Team	Pld	W	L	PF	PA	PD	Qualification	(Mexico)	(Puerto Rico)	(Venezuela)
1	Mexico (H)	2	2	0	30	24	+6	Knockout stage			15–13 (OT)
2	Puerto Rico	2	1	1	32	28	+4	Knockout stage	11–15		21–13
3	Venezuela	2	0	2	26	36	−10				

Source: FIBA
Rules for classification: 1) Wins; 2) Head-to-head record; 3) Points scored.
(H) Hosts

=== Pool D ===
Pos	Team	Pld	W	L	PF	PA	PD	Qualification	(Paraguay)	(Argentina)	(Chile)
1	Paraguay	2	2	0	34	17	+17	Knockout stage			
2	Argentina	2	1	1	23	25	−2	Knockout stage	7–15		
3	Chile	2	0	2	20	35	−15		10–19	10–16	

Source: FIBA
Rules for classification: 1) Wins; 2) Head-to-head record; 3) Points scored.

== Knockout stage ==
Quarter-finals
30 November
Canada	19
Puerto Rico	15
30 November
Paraguay	17
Brazil	18
30 November
United States	21
Argentina	14
30 November
Mexico	20
Dominican Republic	21 OT

Semi-finals
30 November
Canada	21
Brazil	10
30 November
United States	21
Dominican Republic	5

Final
30 November
Canada	19
United States	21
Third place
30 November
Brazil	21
Dominican Republic	14

== Final ranking ==
Rank	Team	Record
1st place, gold medalist(s)	United States	5–0
2nd place, silver medalist(s)	Canada	4–1
3rd place, bronze medalist(s)	Brazil	3–2
4	Dominican Republic	2–3
5	Paraguay	2–1
6	Mexico	2–1
7	Puerto Rico	1–2
8	Argentina	1–2
9	Jamaica	0–2
10	Venezuela	0–2
11	Chile	0–2
12	Cayman Islands	0–2
Eliminated in qualifying draw
13	Uruguay	1–2
14	Ecuador	0–3

== See also ==
- 2025 FIBA 3x3 AmeriCup – Men's tournament
- 2025 FIBA 3x3 Europe Cup – Men's tournament
- 2025 FIBA 3x3 Europe Cup – Women's tournament
- 2025 FIBA 3x3 Asia Cup – Men's tournament
- 2025 FIBA 3x3 Asia Cup – Women's tournament
- 2025 FIBA 3x3 Africa Cup – Men's tournament
- 2025 FIBA 3x3 Africa Cup – Women's tournament
