= Myriam Djekoundade =

French basketball player (born 1998)

No. 9 – Basket Landes
- Position: Small forward
- League: La Boulangère Wonderligue

Personal information
- Born: 2 January 1998 (age 28) Castres, France
- Listed height: 6 ft 1 in (1.85 m)

Career information
- Playing career: 2016–present

Career history
- 2016–2017: Ifs
- 2017–2019: Mondeville
- 2019–2021: Landerneau
- 2021–2022: Saint-Amand
- 2022–2023: Villeneuve-d'Ascq
- 2024–present: Basket Landes

Career highlights
- FIBA 3x3 World Cup winner (2022)
Medals
Representing France
Women's basketball
FIBA U18 Women's European Championship
Gold medal – first place	2016 Sopron
Women's 3x3 basketball
FIBA 3x3 World Cup
Gold medal – first place	2022 Antwerp
Silver medal – second place	2023 Vienna
European Games
Silver medal – second place	2023 Kraków–Małopolska	Team
Europe Cup
Gold medal – first place	2018 Bucharest
Gold medal – first place	2022 Graz

Myriam Djekoundade (born 2 January 1998) is a French basketball player who plays as a small forward.

== Professional career ==
Djekoundade participated in the 2016–2017 season in National 1 at Ifs, a Normandy club near Mondeville. During her first pro season at Mondeville, she averaged 3.1 points and 3.9 rebounds and earned her playing time as a versatile defensive joker. In the spring of 2018, she signed for three more seasons, while continuing higher education that she had put on hold in Hérault. During the 2018–2019 season, her statistics were 6.3 points and 2.2 assists, but she could not avoid Mondeville's relegation to Ligue 2.

Djekoundade then signed with Landerneau and extended her contract in spring 2020. After a second season in Landerneau with 4.3 points and 3.6 rebounds for 6.1 evaluation in 23 minutes of play in 2020–2021, she signed for the club Saint-Amand, still in the LFB. She had more playing time in this club, averaging 32 minutes, 9.1 points and 5.6 rebounds per game. Her club finished 9th and therefore at the foot of the playoffs. She did not stay at Saint-Amand the following season and signed with Villeneuve-d'Ascq for the 2022–2023 season which, having finished second in the regular season.

== National team career ==
During the summer of 2016, Djekoundade played with the French U18 team led by Arnaud Gupillote, who won the European tournament undefeated, beating Spain 74 to 44 in the final. During the summer of 2017, she took part in the U19 World Cup, where France lost in the quarter-finals against the Americans.

In September 2021, Djekoundade won the Nations League gold medal with the French 3x3 under-23 team. With the French women's 3x3 basketball team, she won the silver medal at the 2023 European Games in Krakow.
