= Zhang Zhiting =

Chinese basketball player

No. 15 – Shanghai Swordfish
- Position: Center
- League: WCBA

Personal information
- Born: 21 December 1995 (age 30) Shanghai, China
- Listed height: 6 ft 4.5 in (1.94 m)

Career information
- Playing career: 2013–present

Career history
- 2013–present: Shanghai Swordfish
Medals
Women's 3x3 basketball
Representing China
Olympic Games
Bronze medal – third place	2020 Tokyo	Team
World Cup
Gold medal – first place	2019 Amsterdam	Team
Bronze medal – third place	2022 Antwerp	Team
Asian Games
Gold medal – first place	2018 Jakarta	Team
Asia Cup
Silver medal – second place	2018 Shenzhen
Silver medal – second place	2026 Singapore	Team

Zhang Zhiting (Chinese: 张芷婷, born 21 December 1995) is a Chinese basketball player. She represented China at the 2018 FIBA 3x3 World Cup, as well as for the Women's 3x3 basketball team in the 2020 Summer Olympics in Tokyo, Japan.
