= Kacie Bosch =

Canadian basketball player

Personal information
- Born: November 20, 1996 (age 29) Lethbridge, Alberta, Canada
- Listed height: 175 cm (5 ft 9 in)
Medals
Women's basketball
Representing Canada
FIBA 3x3 World Cup
Silver medal – second place	2022 Antwerp	Team
Bronze medal – third place	2025 Ulaanbaatar	Team

Kacie Bosch (born November 20, 1996) is a Canadian basketball player for the Canadian national 3x3 team.

== Career ==
Bosch started her 3x3 career in 2021. Bosch was part of the Canadian team that won the FIBA 3×3 Women's Series in 2022 and 2023.

In June 2024, Bosch was named to Canada's 2024 Olympic team.

== Personal life ==
Bosch completed a Bachelor of Arts in psychology and a Bachelor of Education at the University of Lethbridge.
