= Wang Lili (basketball) =

Chinese basketball player (born 1992)

No. 23 – Hebei Win Power
- Position: Guard
- League: WCBA

Personal information
- Born: 8 September 1992 (age 34) Jiamusi, China
- Listed height: 1.76 m (5 ft 9 in)
- Listed weight: 78 kg (172 lb)

Career information
- Playing career: 2014–present

Career history
- 2014–2015: Beijing Great Wall
- 2015–2023: Xinjiang Tianshan
- 2023–2024: Sichuan Yuanda
- 2024–2025: Inner Mongolia Rural Credit Union
- 2025–present: Hebei Win Power

Wang Lili (born 8 September 1992) is a Chinese basketball player. She competed in the 2020 Summer Olympics.
