= Colombia women's national 3x3 team =

National 3x3 basketball team

Colombia
- FIBA zone: FIBA Americas
- National federation: Federación Colombiana de Baloncesto

AmeriCup
- Appearances: 4
- Medals: Bronze (2026)

The Colombia women's national 3x3 team is a national basketball team of Colombia, administered by the Federación Colombiana de Baloncesto. It represents the country in international 3x3 (3 against 3) basketball competitions.

== AmeriCup record ==
Year	Position	Pld	W	L
(United States) 2021 Miami	did not qualify			
(United States) 2022 Miami	4th	5	2	3
(Puerto Rico) 2023 San Juan	12th	5	3	2
(Puerto Rico) 2024 San Juan	9th	2	0	2
(Mexico) 2025 León	did not qualify			
(El Salvador) 2026 San Salvador	3rd	5	3	2
Total	4/6	17	8	9
