= 2022 FIBA 3x3 AmeriCup – Women's tournament =

Basketball competition in Miami, US

Tournament details
- Host country: United States
- City: Miami
- Dates: 4–6 November
- Teams: 13
- Venue: FTX Arena

Final positions
- Champions: Canada (1st title)
- Runners-up: Brazil
- Third place: United States
- Fourth place: Colombia

Tournament statistics
- MVP: (Canada) Michelle Plouffe

The 2022 FIBA 3x3 AmeriCup – Women's tournament is the second edition of this continental championship. The event was held in Miami, United States. It was contested by 13 teams.

Canada won their first title with a win against Brazil with the final score being 15–11.

== Host selection ==
Miami was given the hosting rights for the second successive time.

== Participating teams ==
All National Federations in the Americas region were invited to register a team for the 2022 FIBA 3x3 AmeriCup.

Preliminary round

Pool A

- United States (1)
- Guyana (9)
- Colombia (10)

Pool B

- Canada (2)
- Guatemala (8)
- Qualifier

Pool C

- Chile (3)
- Argentina (7)
- Jamaica (12)

Pool D

- Dominican Republic (5)
- Puerto Rico (6)
- Qualifier

Qualifying draw

Pool A

- Brazil (4)
- Trinidad and Tobago (11)
- Barbados (13)

== Qualifying draw ==
The top two qualifies for the next round.

=== Pool A ===
| Pos | Team | Pld | W | L | PF | PA | PD | Qualification | (Brazil) | (Trinidad and Tobago) | (Barbados) |
|---|---|---|---|---|---|---|---|---|---|---|---|
| 1 | Brazil | 2 | 2 | 0 | 43 | 11 | +32 | Preliminary round | | 22–10 | 21–1 |
| 2 | Trinidad and Tobago | 2 | 1 | 1 | 31 | 35 | −4 | Preliminary round | | | 21–13 |
| 3 | Barbados | 2 | 0 | 2 | 14 | 42 | −28 | | | | |

Source: FIBA
Rules for classification: 1) Wins; 2) Head-to-head record; 3) Points scored.

== Preliminary round ==
=== Pool A ===
| Pos | Team | Pld | W | L | PF | PA | PD | Qualification | (United States) | (Colombia) | (Guyana) |
|---|---|---|---|---|---|---|---|---|---|---|---|
| 1 | United States (H) | 2 | 2 | 0 | 33 | 8 | +25 | quarter-finals | | 12–6 | 21–2 |
| 2 | Colombia | 2 | 1 | 1 | 27 | 15 | +12 | quarter-finals | | | |
| 3 | Guyana | 2 | 0 | 2 | 5 | 42 | −37 | | | 3–21 | |

Source: FIBA
Rules for classification: 1) Wins; 2) Head-to-head record; 3) Points scored.
(H) Hosts

=== Pool B ===
| Pos | Team | Pld | W | L | PF | PA | PD | Qualification | (Brazil) | (Canada) | (Guatemala) |
|---|---|---|---|---|---|---|---|---|---|---|---|
| 1 | Brazil | 2 | 2 | 0 | 43 | 13 | +30 | quarter-finals | | | |
| 2 | Canada | 2 | 1 | 1 | 28 | 28 | 0 | quarter-finals | 7–21 | | 21–7 |
| 3 | Guatemala | 2 | 0 | 2 | 13 | 43 | −30 | | 6–22 | | |

Source: FIBA
Rules for classification: 1) Wins; 2) Head-to-head record; 3) Points scored.

=== Pool C ===
| Pos | Team | Pld | W | L | PF | PA | PD | Qualification | (Jamaica) | (Puerto Rico) | (Argentina) |
|---|---|---|---|---|---|---|---|---|---|---|---|
| 1 | Jamaica | 2 | 2 | 0 | 30 | 25 | +5 | quarter-finals | | | |
| 2 | Chile | 2 | 1 | 1 | 34 | 34 | 0 | quarter-finals | 17–18 | | 17–16 |
| 3 | Argentina | 2 | 0 | 2 | 24 | 29 | −5 | | 8–12 | | |

Source: FIBA
Rules for classification: 1) Wins; 2) Head-to-head record; 3) Points scored.

=== Pool D ===
| Pos | Team | Pld | W | L | PF | PA | PD | Qualification | (Dominican Republic) | (Puerto Rico) | (Trinidad and Tobago) |
|---|---|---|---|---|---|---|---|---|---|---|---|
| 1 | Dominican Republic | 2 | 2 | 0 | 34 | 24 | +10 | quarter-finals | | 13–11 | 21–13 |
| 2 | Puerto Rico | 2 | 1 | 1 | 32 | 27 | +5 | quarter-finals | | | 21–14 |
| 3 | Trinidad and Tobago | 2 | 0 | 2 | 27 | 42 | −15 | | | | |

Source: FIBA
Rules for classification: 1) Wins; 2) Head-to-head record; 3) Points scored.

== Knockout stage ==
All times are local.

Quarter-finals
06 Nov 2022 – 15:45
United States | 18
Chile | 11
06 Nov 2022 – 16:10
Dominican Republic | 4
Canada | 21
06 Nov 2022 – 17:35
Brazil | 22
Puerto Rico | 14
06 Nov 2022 – 18:00
Jamaica | 9
Colombia | 17

Semi-finals
06 Nov 2022 – 19:25
United States | 15
Canada | 17
06 Nov 2022 – 19:50
Brazil | 18
Colombia | 11

Final
06 Nov 2022 – 22:20
Canada | 15
Brazil | 11
Bronze medal
06 Nov 2022 – 21:20
United States | 17
Colombia | 13

== Final standings ==
| Pos | Team | Pld | W | L | PF | PA | PD |
|---|---|---|---|---|---|---|---|
| 1 | Canada | 5 | 4 | 1 | 81 | 65 | +16 |
| 2 | Brazil | 7 | 6 | 1 | 137 | 64 | +73 |
| 3 | United States | 5 | 4 | 1 | 83 | 49 | +34 |
| 4 | Colombia | 5 | 2 | 3 | 68 | 59 | +9 |
| 5 | Jamaica | 3 | 2 | 1 | 39 | 42 | –3 |
| 6 | Dominican Republic | 3 | 2 | 1 | 38 | 45 | –7 |
| 7 | Puerto Rico | 3 | 1 | 2 | 46 | 49 | –3 |
| 8 | Chile | 3 | 1 | 2 | 45 | 52 | –7 |
| 9 | Trinidad and Tobago | 4 | 1 | 3 | 58 | 77 | –19 |
| 10 | Argentina | 2 | 0 | 2 | 24 | 29 | –5 |
| 11 | Guatemala | 2 | 0 | 2 | 13 | 43 | –30 |
| 12 | Guyana | 2 | 0 | 2 | 5 | 42 | –37 |

Eliminated in the qualifying draw

| Pos | Team | Pld | W | L | PF | PA | PD |
|---|---|---|---|---|---|---|---|
| 13 | Barbados | 2 | 0 | 2 | 14 | 42 | –28 |

== Awards ==
These players were given the awards after the competition:

=== Most valuable player ===
- (Canada) Michelle Plouffe

=== Top scorer ===
- (Brazil) Vitoria Marcelino (55 points)

=== Team of the tournament ===
- (Canada) Michelle Plouffe
- (Brazil) Vitoria Marcelino
- (United States) Camille Zimmerman

== See also ==
- 2022 FIBA 3x3 World Cup – Men's tournament
- 2022 FIBA 3x3 World Cup – Women's tournament
- 2022 FIBA 3x3 AmeriCup – Men's tournament
- 2022 FIBA 3x3 Africa Cup
- 2022 FIBA 3x3 U17 Africa Cup – Men's tournament
- 2022 FIBA 3x3 U17 Africa Cup – Women's tournament
- 2022 FIBA 3x3 Asia Cup
- 2022 FIBA 3x3 Europe Cup
