= Paige Crozon =

Canadian basketball player

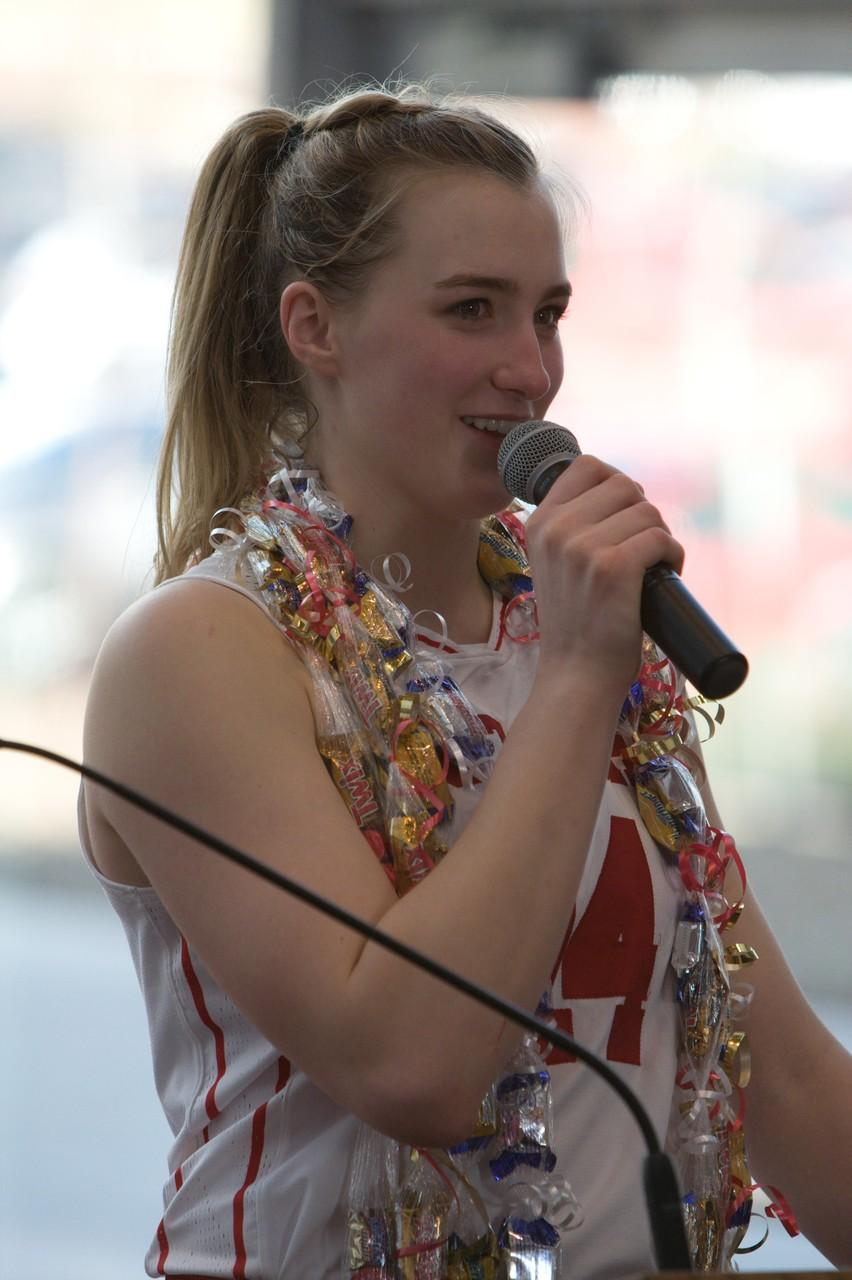

No. 21 – Movistar Estudiantes
- Position: Power Forward
- League: Liga Femenina Endesa

Personal information
- Born: July 5, 1994 (age 32) Humboldt, Saskatchewan, Canada
- Listed height: 185 cm (6 ft 1 in)
Medals
Women's basketball
Representing Canada
FIBA 3x3 World Cup
Silver medal – second place	2022 Antwerp	Team
Bronze medal – third place	2025 Ulaanbaatar	Team
FIBA 3x3 AmeriCup
Gold medal – first place	2026 San Salvador
Silver medal – second place	2025 León

Paige Marlene Crozon (born July 5, 1994) is a Canadian professional basketball player, currently playing for Movistar Estudiantes athe Spanish Liga Femenina and for the national women’s 3x3 team.

== Career ==
Crozon represented Canada at the 2011 Pan American Games in Mexico. Crozon started her 3x3 career in 2019. Crozon was part of the Canadian team that won the FIBA 3×3 Women's Series in 2022 and 2023.

In May 2024, Crozon led Team Canada to Olympic qualification. In June 2024, Crozon was named to Canada's 2024 Olympic team.

In December 2025, Corzon was hired by the Spanish team Movistar Estudiantes to play in the Spanish Liga Femenina Endesa and the FIBA Eurocup Women.

== Personal life ==
While competing for Canada, Crozon is raising a child while managing the Living Skies Indigenous Basketball League. Crozon is also the assistant coach at the University of Lethbridge.
