= Uruguay women's national 3x3 team =

National 3x3 basketball team

Uruguay
- FIBA zone: FIBA Americas

FIBA 3x3 World Championships
- Appearances: 1 (2014)
- Medals: None

The Uruguay women's national 3x3 team is a national basketball team of Uruguay, administered by the Federación Uruguaya de Básquetbol - "FUBB".

It represents the country in international 3x3 (3 against 3) women's basketball competitions.

At the 2020 Summer Olympics qualification, 15th seed Uruguay was in the 'Group of Death' where they played against the United States and France. For Uruguay, both Florencia Somma and Victoria Pereyra had already represented their country at the second FIBA 3x3 World Cup of all time back in 2014 in Moscow, Russia.

== See also ==
- Uruguay women's national basketball team
- Uruguay men's national 3x3 team
