= 2017 FIBA 3x3 World Cup – Women's tournament =

2017 FIBA 3x3 World Cup
Tournament details
- Host country: France
- City: Nantes
- Dates: 17–21 June 2017
- Teams: 20
- Venue: 1 (in 1 host city)

Final positions
- Champions: Russia (1st title)
- Runners-up: Hungary
- Third place: Ukraine
- Fourth place: Netherlands

Tournament statistics
- MVP: (Russia) Anna Leshkovtseva

The women's tournament of the 2017 FIBA 3x3 World Cup host in Nantes, France, was attended by 20 teams.

== Participating teams ==
Every FIBA zone except FIBA Africa were represented. The top 20 teams, including the hosts, based on the FIBA National Federation ranking qualified for the tournament as of 01.03.2017.

FIBA Asia (6)

- Bahrain (14)
- China (12)
- Japan (15)
- Kazakhstan (18)
- Kyrgyzstan (17)
- Turkmenistan (16)

FIBA Africa (0)

- None

FIBA Oceania (1)

- Australia (20)

FIBA Americas (2)

- Argentina (13)
- Venezuela (19)

FIBA Europe (11)

- Andorra (11)
- Czech Republic (5)
- France (2) (hosts)
- Germany (9)
- Hungary (1)
- Italy (4)
- Netherlands (3)
- Russia (8)
- Spain (10)
- Switzerland (7)
- Ukraine (6)

== Players ==
Team	Players (World Ranking as of 17.06.2017)
Andorra	Nàdia Mun (822), Claudia Brunet (1774), Jennifer Carmona (2069), Maria Martín Moliné (2081)
Argentina	Inés Orselli Swinnen (51928), Sofia Chelini (-), Mara Marchizotti (-), Noelia Zinna (-)
Australia	Rebecca Cole (-), Carley Mijović (-), Nadeen Payne (-), Amelia Todhunter (-)
Bahrain	Fatima Bushehri (3594), Seema Hassan (4185), Fatima Ali (4467), Hessa Aljaber (25514)
China	Qi Xue Xuan (11558), Liu Yusen (20947), Ruoyun Zhai (24920), Zhang Meng (24947)
Czech Republic	Tereza Vorlova (199), Kristýna Minarovicova (366), Michaela Uhrová (472), Kateřina Novotna (621)
France	Alice Nayo (535), Dijon Sandra (582), Caroline Heriaud (712), Sabrina Palie (849)
Germany	Lara Muller (17623), Kristin Annawald (17802), Mary Ann Mihalyi (17803), Wiebke Bruns (25211)
Hungary	Alexandra Theodorean (261), Krisztina Sule (1762), Bettina Bozóki (3608), Klaudia Papp (4373)
Italy	Marcella Filippi (635), Federica Tognalini (1195), Alice Richter (13559), Rae Lin D'alie (-)
Japan	Masami Tachiwaka (5571), Yui Hanada (15472), Megumi Iizuka (40307), Ryoko Yano (-)
Kazakhstan	Aidana Satova (1969), Aizhan Mukhamedyarova (2215), Gulmira Soltankulova (2627), Yulia Sayapina (22452)
Kyrgyzstan	Diana Akzholtoeva (1781), Aigul Dzhaparova (2152), Marina Pechenikhina (7040), Anastasiia Shamonina (8870)
Netherlands	Karin Kuijt (4061), Jacobine Klerx (5846), Loyce Bettonvil (5855), Jill Bettonvil (5873)
Russia	Aleksandra Stolyar (1401), Anna Leshkovtseva (3887), Anastasia Logunova (-), Tatiana Petrushina (-)
Spain	Esther Montenegro (2313), Sandra Ygueravide (2325), Vega Gimeno (2628), Celia Menéndez (10509)
Switzerland	Marielle Giroud (1054), Alexia Rol (1075), Sarah Kershaw (1357), Caroline Turin (20723)
Turkmenistan	Nigyara Nagiyeva (1413), Leyla Halilova (1442), Ayna Gokova (1508), Mahrijemal Jumageldiyeva (1543)
Ukraine	Darya Zavidna (394), Oksana Mollova (737), Ganna Zarytska (1185), Krystyna Filevych (3055)
Venezuela	Ivaney Marquez (2337), Raymar Garcia (3520), Luisana Ortega (3683), Siuly Marcano (4066)

== Main tournament ==
=== Preliminary round ===
==== Pool A ====
Pos	Team	Pld	W	L	PF	PA	PD	Qualification	(Russia)	(Hungary)	(Germany)	(Kazakhstan)	(Kyrgyzstan)
1	Russia	4	4	0	75	24	+51	Qualification to knockout stage	—	12–10	20–7	21–3	22–4
2	Hungary	4	3	1	73	27	+46	Qualification to knockout stage	10–12	—	20–6	21–6	22–3
3	Germany	4	2	2	47	58	−11		7–20	6–20	—	21–6	13–12
4	Kazakhstan	4	1	3	34	67	−33		3–21	6–21	6–21	—	19–4
5	Kyrgyzstan	4	0	4	23	76	−53		4–22	3–22	12–13	4–19	—

Rules for classification: 1) Wins; 2) Head-to-Head record; 3) Points scored; 4) Higher seed.

==== Pool B ====
Pos	Team	Pld	W	L	PF	PA	PD	Qualification	(Switzerland)	(Spain)	(France)	(Turkmenistan)	(Venezuela)
1	Switzerland	4	4	0	72	34	+38	Qualification to knockout stage	—	15–13	15–13	21–4	21–4
2	Spain	4	3	1	71	39	+32	Qualification to knockout stage	13–15	—	17–15	20–3	21–6
3	France	4	2	2	60	53	+7		13–15	15–17	—	17–9	15–12
4	Turkmenistan	4	1	3	27	67	−40		4–21	3–20	9–17	—	11–9
5	Venezuela	4	0	4	31	68	−37		4–21	6–21	12–15	9–11	—

Rules for classification: 1) Wins; 2) Head-to-Head record; 3) Points scored; 4) Higher seed.

==== Pool C ====
Pos	Team	Pld	W	L	PF	PA	PD	Qualification	(Netherlands)	(Ukraine)	(Australia)	(Japan)	(China)
1	Netherlands	4	4	0	61	45	+16	Qualification to knockout stage	—	17–12	16–14	16–9	12–10
2	Ukraine	4	3	1	70	47	+23	Qualification to knockout stage	12–17	—	21–12	15–9	22–9
3	Australia	4	2	2	65	52	+13		14–16	12–21	—	18–8	21–7
4	Japan	4	1	3	45	58	−13		9–16	9–15	8–18	—	19–9
5	China	4	0	4	35	74	−39		10–12	9–22	7–21	9–19	—

Rules for classification: 1) Wins; 2) Head-to-Head record; 3) Points scored; 4) Higher seed.

==== Pool D ====
Pos	Team	Pld	W	L	PF	PA	PD	Qualification	(Italy)	(Czech Republic)	(Argentina)	(Andorra)	(Bahrain)
1	Italy	4	4	0	73	29	+44	Qualification to knockout stage	—	18–8	15–5	18–11	21–5
2	Czech Republic	4	3	1	71	44	+27	Qualification to knockout stage	8–18	—	21–10	21–9	21–7
3	Argentina	4	2	2	51	46	+5		5–15	10–21	—	15–6	21–4
4	Andorra	4	1	3	39	36	+3		11–18	9–21	6–15	—	13–7
5	Bahrain	4	0	4	23	61	−38		5–21	7–21	4–21	7–13	—

Rules for classification: 1) Wins; 2) Head-to-Head record; 3) Points scored; 4) Higher seed.

=== Knockout stage ===
Quarter-finals
Russia	22
Czech Republic	13
Netherlands	17
Spain	13
Switzerland	9
Ukraine	13
Italy	16
Hungary	18

Semi-finals
Russia	21
Netherlands	9
Ukraine	13
Hungary	15

Final
Russia	19
Hungary	12
Bronze Final
Netherlands	13
Ukraine	15

== Final standings ==
Rank	Team	Record
1st place, gold medalist(s)	Russia	7–0
2nd place, silver medalist(s)	Hungary	5–2
3rd place, bronze medalist(s)	Ukraine	5–2
4	Netherlands	5–2
5	Italy	4–1
6	Switzerland	4–1
7	Czech Republic	3–2
8	Spain	3–2
9	Australia	2–2
10	France	2–2
11	Argentina	2–2
12	Germany	2–2
13	Japan	1–3
14	Andorra	1–3
15	Kazakhstan	1–3
16	Turkmenistan	1–3
17	China	0–4
18	Venezuela	0–4
19	Bahrain	0–4
20	Kyrgyzstan	0–4

== Individual contests ==
=== Skills contest ===
==== Qualification ====
Format

One player from each women's team was eligible to enter the Skills contest. In the qualification stage, each player were to perform a set of basketball moves and skills from a starting line at a side of the player's choosing:

- Hit Corner Shot after the "Go" signal is made
- Dribble through a slalom through four cones
- Make a straight pass into a target
- Dribble through a second slalom with 2 balls forwards then backwards
- Make a straight pass
- Make a third dribble through the slalom
- Score a basket.

The four fastest women who were able to perform the tasked required qualified for the final round. A time limit of 45 seconds was given. In the case of a tie, the tied players would have to do the same run again.

Results

Qualification for the final

Team	Player	Time left
Andorra	Claudia Brunet	16
Netherlands	Karin Kuijt	16
Japan	Yui Hanada	15
China	Liu Yusen	14.9
Australia	Rebecca Cole	14.6
France	Caroline Heriaud	12
Hungary	Alexandra Theodorean	12
Spain	Sandra Ygueravide	12
Venezuela	Raymar Garcia	11
Argentina	Ines Orselli	8
Germany	Lara Muller	7
Russia	Anna Leskovtseva	6
Turkmenistan	Layla Halilova	3
Italy	Rae Lin D'alie	2

==== Final ====
Format

The format used in the qualification round is used once again but this time the players face each other head to head with the best player from the qualification playing against the fourth best and the second best player playing against the third.

Results

	Team	Player
1st place, gold medalist(s)	Andorra	Claudia Brunet
2nd place, silver medalist(s)	Netherlands	Karin Kuijt
3rd place, bronze medalist(s)	Japan	Yui Hanada
4th	China	Liu Yusen

== Awards ==
2017 FIBA 3x3 World Champions – Women's

Russia
1st title

=== Teams ===
Team of the Day

- June 17: Netherlands

Game of the Day

- June 18: Italy 18–8 Czech Republic

=== Individual ===
Most Valuable Player

- (Russia) Anna Leshkovtseva
