= 2027 FIBA 3x3 World Cup – Women's tournament =

2027 FIBA 3x3 World Cup
Tournament details
- Host country: Singapore
- Dates: June
- Teams: 20

The 2027 FIBA 3x3 World Cup will be held in Singapore in June 2027, and contested by 20 teams.

== Qualified teams ==
The host, along the winners of the four zone cups of four FIBA zones, and the three winners of the qualifiers qualify. The other twelve teams qualify based on the FIBA National Federation rankings.

Competition	Dates	Host	Vacancies	Qualified
Host nation			1	Singapore
2026 FIBA 3x3 Europe Cup	11–13 September 2026	(Belgium) Antwerp	1	Netherlands
2026 FIBA 3x3 AmeriCup	5–8 November 2026	(El Salvador) TBD	1	
2026 FIBA 3x3 Africa Cup	3–6 December 2026	(Madagascar) Antananarivo	1	
2027 FIBA 3x3 Asia Cup	31 March – 4 April 2027	(Mongolia) Ulaanbaatar	1	
3x3 World Cup Qualifier			3	
Rankings			12	
Total			20	
