= 3x3 basketball at the 2015 European Games =

- Venue: Tofiq Bahramov Stadium
- Dates: 22–26 June 2015
- Competitors: 128 from 16 per event nations

1st European Games Basketball Tournament
- Baku 2015

Tournament details
- European Games: 2015 European Games
- Host nation: Azerbaijan
- City: Baku
- Duration: June 22–26

Men's tournament
- Teams: 16

Women's tournament
- Teams: 16

Official website
- www.baku2015.com

Basketball competitions at the 2015 European Games were held from June 22 to June 26, 2015 at the Basketball Arena in Baku. The competition took place in the half-court 3x3 format, which later made its Olympic debut at the 2020 Tokyo Olympics, and both the men's and women's tournaments featured sixteen teams. Each qualifying team consisted of four players, of whom three could appear on court at any one time.

== Qualification ==
A NOC may enter one men's team with four players and one women's team with four players. The host country qualifies automatically in each tournament, as do fifteen other teams throughout Europe. The top fifteen teams at the 2014 FIBA Europe 3x3 Championships were also eligible to send a team.

=== Qualified teams ===
Qualified as	Men	Women
Host quota	Azerbaijan	Azerbaijan
2014 FIBA Europe 3x3 Championships, Top 15	Andorra; Belgium; Czech Republic; Estonia; Greece; Israel; Italy; Lithuania; Romania; Russia; Serbia; Slovenia; Spain; Switzerland; Turkey	Belgium; Czech Republic; Greece; Ireland; Israel; Lithuania; Netherlands; Romania; Russia; Slovakia; Slovenia; Spain; Switzerland; Turkey; Ukraine

== Medal summary ==
Event	Gold	Silver	Bronze
Men	Russia; Ilia Aleksandrov; Andrey Kanygin; Leopold Lagutin; Alexsandr Pavlov	Spain; Sergio de la Fuente; Álex Llorca; Nacho Martín; Juan Vasco	Serbia; Dušan Domović Bulut; Dejan Majstorović; Marko Savić; Marko Ždero
Women	Russia; Tatiana Petrushina; Tatiana Vidmer; Mariia Cherepanova; Anna Leshkovtseva	Ukraine; Viktoriia Paziuk; Krystyna Matsko; Olga Maznichenko; Ganna Zarytska	Spain; Vega Gimeno; Arantxa Novo; Esther Montenegro; Inmaculada Zanoguera
