= 2017 FIBA 3x3 World Cup =

Basketball competition

Coupe du Monde FIBA 3x3 2017

Tournament details
- Host country: France
- City: Nantes
- Dates: 17–21 June 2017
- Teams: 40
- Venue: 1 (in 1 host city)

The 2017 FIBA 3x3 World Cup, hosted by France, was an international 3x3 basketball event that featured separate competitions for men's and women's national teams. The tournament ran between 17 and 21 June 2017, in Nantes. It was co-organized by FIBA.

Matches took place outdoors at the Parc des Chantiers de I'lle nearby the Grand Éléphant and l'Arbre à Basket.

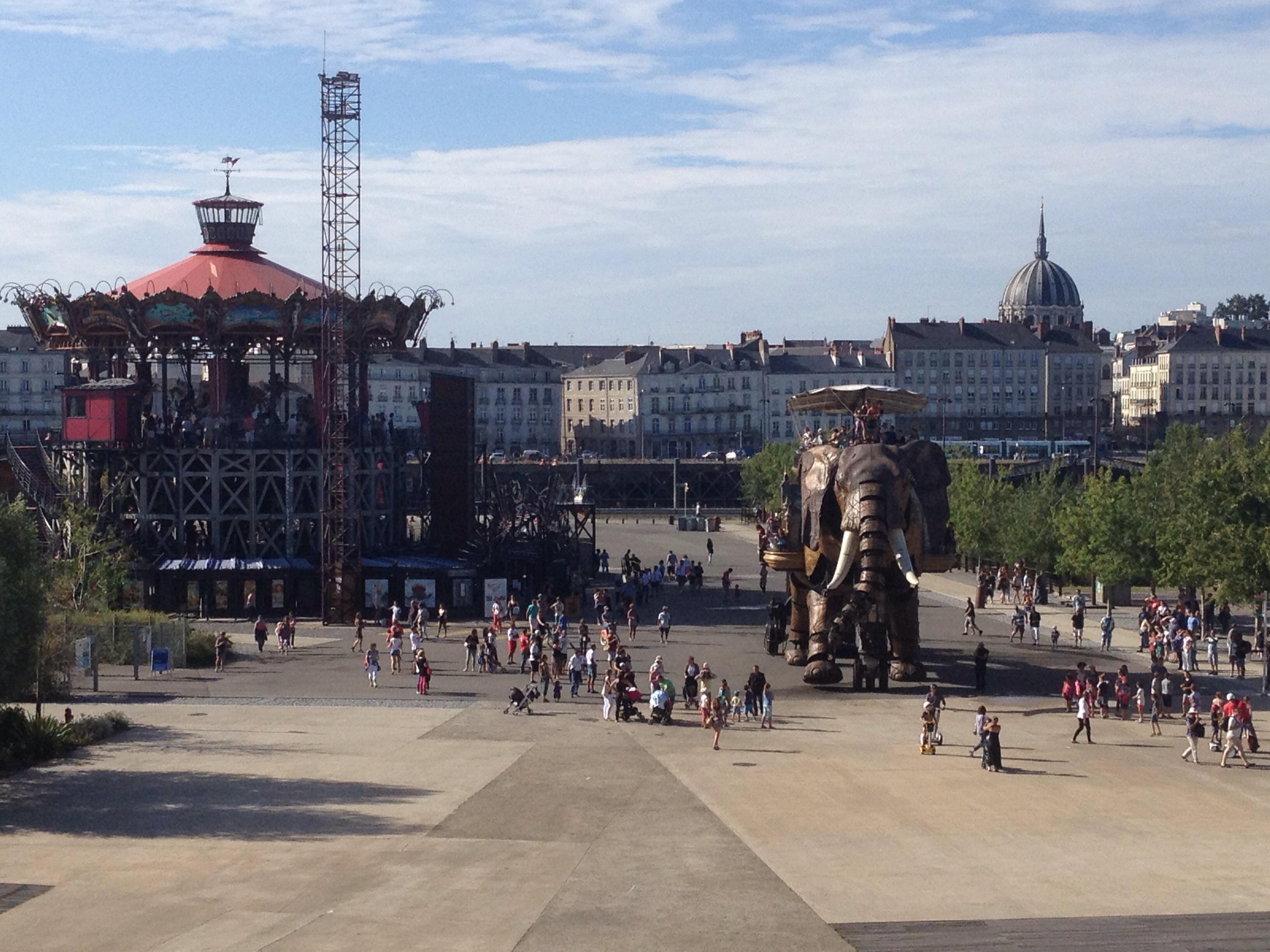
Parc des Chantiers de I'lle, the venue of the tournament.

== Medalists ==
Event	Gold	Silver	Bronze
Men's team Details	Serbia; Dušan Domović Bulut; Marko Savić; Marko Ždero; Dejan Majstorović	Netherlands; Jesper Jobse; Joey Schelvis; Sjoerd Van Vilsteren; Bas Rozendaal	France; Charles Bronchard; Dominique Gentil; Angelo Tsagarakis; Charly Pontens
Women's team Details	Russia; Aleksandra Stolyar; Anna Leshkovtseva; Anastasia Logunova; Tatiana Petrushina	Hungary; Alexandra Theodorean; Krisztina Sule; Bettina Bozóki; Klaudia Papp	Ukraine; Darya Zavidna; Oksana Mollova; Ganna Zarytska; Krystyna Filevych
Skills contest Details	(Andorra) Claudia Brunet	(Netherlands) Karin Kuijt	(Japan) Yuri Hanada
Dunk contest Details	(Poland) Rafal Lipinski	(United States) Chris Staples	(Ukraine) Vadym Poddubchenko

== Participating teams ==
The FIBA 3x3 Federation Ranking was used as basis to determine the participating FIBA member associations.

=== Men ===
Pool A

- Serbia
- Russia
- Andorra
- Egypt
- Puerto Rico

Pool B

- Slovenia
- Romania
- France
- El Salvador
- Philippines

Pool C

- Poland
- Ukraine
- Estonia
- Qatar
- Sri Lanka

Pool D

- United States
- Netherlands
- New Zealand
- Indonesia
- South Korea

=== Women ===
Pool A

- Hungary
- Russia
- Germany
- Kyrgyzstan
- Kazakhstan

Pool B

- France
- Switzerland
- Spain
- Turkmenistan
- Venezuela

Pool C

- Netherlands
- Ukraine
- China
- Japan
- Australia

Pool D

- Italy
- Czech Republic
- Argentina
- Bahrain
- Cameroon
