= 2018 FIBA 3x3 World Cup =

International 3x3 basketball tournament

Tournament details
- Host country: Philippines
- City: Bocaue
- Dates: 8–12 June 2018
- Teams: 40
- Venue(s): 1 (in 1 host city)

The 2018 FIBA 3x3 World Cup, hosted by the Philippines, was an international 3x3 basketball event that featured separate competitions for men's and women's national teams. The tournament ran between 8 and 12 June 2018 in Bocaue, Bulacan, just north of Manila. It is co-organized by FIBA.

== Background ==
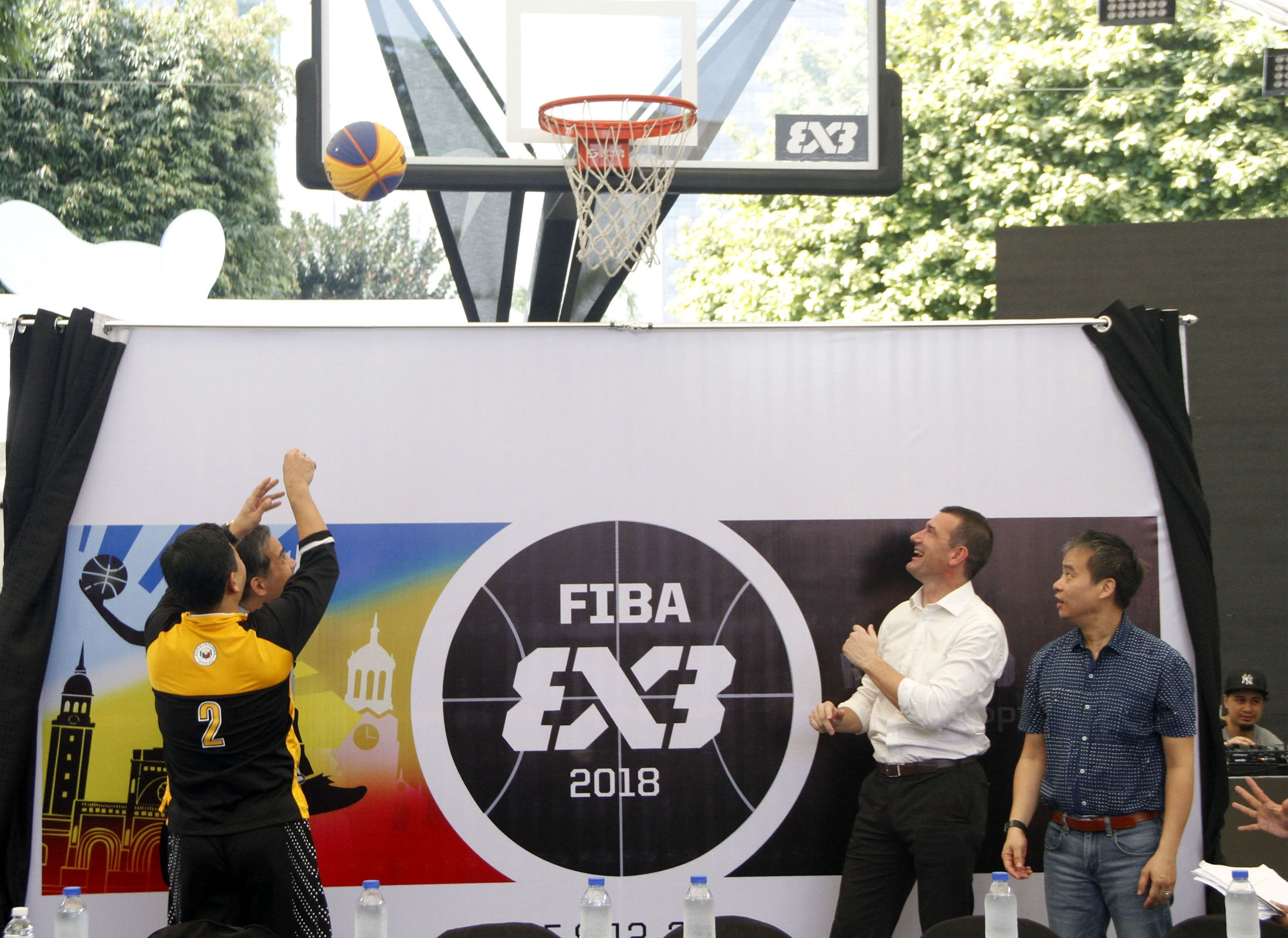
Official launch of the 2018 FIBA 3x3 World Cup at Bonifacio Global City. 18 January 2018.

It was announced on 5 December 2017 that the tournament would be held at the Philippine Arena in Bocaue, Bulacan, which is just north of Metro Manila. Since the final would be held on Philippine Independence Day, cultural events were also planned alongside the tournament proper. The Philippine Arena will also be used for the 2023 FIBA Basketball World Cup.

The tournament was officially launched on 18 January 2018 at the Bonifacio High Street in Taguig. The official logo for the event was also unveiled during the ceremony.

== Medalists ==
| Event | Gold | Silver | Bronze |
|---|---|---|---|
| Men's team Details | Serbia; Dušan Bulut; Dejan Majstorović; Marko Savić; Stefan Stojačić | Netherlands; Jesper Jobse; Aron Royé; Dimeo van der Horst; Sjoerd van Vilsteren | Slovenia; Simon Finžgar; Adin Kavgić; Gašper Ovnik; Anže Srebovt |
| Women's team Details | Italy; Giulia Ciavarella; Rae Lin D'Alie; Marcella Filippi; Giulia Rulli | Russia; Anna Leshkovtseva; Anastasia Logunova; Tatiana Petrushina; Alexandra Stolyar | France; Christelle Diallo; Alice Nayo; Johanna Tayeau; Marie-Ève Paget |
| Skills contest Details | Alexandra Theodoreán (HUN) | Marie-Ève Paget (FRA) | Zalina Kurasova (KAZ) |
| Dunk contest Details | Dmytro Krivenko (UKR) | Guy Dupuy (FRA) | David Carlos (PHI) |
| Shoot-out contest (mixed); Details | Janine Pontejos (PHI) | Alexandra Stolyar (RUS) | Marin Hrvoje (CRO) |

== Participating teams ==
The FIBA 3x3 Federation Ranking on 17 January 2018 was used as basis to determine the participating FIBA member associations. The hosts, the Philippines, qualified automatically for both the men's and women's events, while the defending champions, Serbia for men's and Russia for women's, also qualified automatically. The top 20 teams in the men's and women's Federation Rankings qualified with the following conditions: a maximum of 10 teams from a single continent could qualify and at least 30 FIBA member associations must participate. The 40 qualifying teams (20 each for the men's and women's tournaments) had to confirm their participation by 30 November 2017. FIBA confirmed the participation of 37 member associations on 18 January 2018.

=== Main tournaments ===
==== Men ====
Pool A

- Serbia
- Netherlands
- Romania
- New Zealand
- Kyrgyzstan

Pool B

- Slovenia
- Poland
- Estonia
- Japan
- Indonesia

Pool C

- Russia
- Brazil
- Mongolia
- Canada
- Philippines

Pool D

- Latvia
- Ukraine
- Croatia
- Jordan
- Nigeria

==== Women ====
Pool A

- Czech Republic
- Italy
- Indonesia
- Malaysia
- Turkmenistan

Pool B

- China
- France
- Kazakhstan
- Switzerland
- Argentina

Pool C

- Andorra
- Russia
- Iran
- United States
- Uganda

Pool D

- Hungary
- Netherlands
- Germany
- Spain
- Philippines

=== Individual contests ===
==== Dunk contest ====
- France (1)
- Lithuania (1)
- Poland (1)
- Philippines (2)
- Ukraine (2)

==== Skills contest ====
- Andorra
- China
- France
- Germany
- Hungary
- India
- Iran
- Italy
- Kazakhstan
- Malaysia
- Philippines
- Russia
- Switzerland
- Turkmenistan
- Uganda
- United States

==== Shoot-out contest ====
- Andorra (1)
- Argentina (1)
- Brazil (1)
- Canada (1)
- China (1)
- Croatia (1)
- Czech Republic (1)
- France (1)
- Germany (1)
- Hungary (1)
- Indonesia (2)
- Iran (1)
- Japan (1)
- Jordan (1)
- Kazakhstan (1)
- Kyrgyzstan (1)
- Latvia (1)
- Malaysia (1)
- Mongolia (1)
- Netherlands (1)
- Nigeria (1)
- Romania (1)
- Russia (2)
- Serbia (1)
- Slovenia (1)
- Spain (1)
- Switzerland (1)
- Turkmenistan (1)
- Philippines (2)
- Poland (1)
- Uganda (1)
- United States (1)
- Ukraine (1)
