= 3x3 basketball at the Summer Olympics =

- IOC Code: BK3
- Events: 2 (men: 1; women: 1)

Summer Olympics
- 1896; 1900; 1904; 1908; 1912; 1920; 1924; 1928; 1932; 1936; 1948; 1952; 1956; 1960; 1964; 1968; 1972; 1976; 1980; 1984; 1988; 1992; 1996; 2000; 2004; 2008; 2012; 2016; 2020; 2024; 2028; 2032
- Medalists

3x3 basketball was introduced at the Summer Olympic Games as an official Olympic sport in 2020.

== History ==
On 9 June 2017, the executive board of the International Olympic Committee announced that 3x3 basketball would become an official Olympic sport as of the 2020 Summer Olympics in Tokyo, Japan, for both men and women. (The 2020 Olympics were postponed to 2021 due to the COVID-19 pandemic).

== Men ==
=== Summary ===
Year	Hosts	Gold Medal Game			Bronze Medal Game		
Year	Hosts	Gold	Score	Silver	Bronze	Score	Fourth place
2020 Details	(Japan); Tokyo	Latvia	21–18	ROC	Serbia	21–14	Belgium
2024 Details	(France); Paris	Netherlands	18–17 (OT)	France	Lithuania	21–18	Latvia
2028 Details	(United States); Los Angeles						

=== Medal table ===
Rank	Nation	Gold	Silver	Bronze	Total
1	Latvia	1	0	0	1
1	Netherlands	1	0	0	1
3	France	0	1	0	1
3	ROC (ROC)	0	1	0	1
5	Lithuania	0	0	1	1
5	Serbia	0	0	1	1
Totals (6 entries)		2	2	2	6

=== Participating nations ===
Nation	2020 (Japan)	2024 (France)	2028 (United States)	Years
Belgium	4th	•		1
China	8th	8th		2
France	•	2nd		1
Japan	6th	•		1
Latvia	1st	4th		2
Lithuania	•	3rd		1
Netherlands	5th	1st		2
Poland	7th	6th		2
ROC	2nd	•		1
Serbia	3rd	5th		2
United States	•	7th	Q	2
Nations	8	8	12	

== Women ==
=== Summary ===
Year	Hosts	Gold Medal Game			Bronze Medal Game		
Year	Hosts	Gold	Score	Silver	Bronze	Score	Fourth place
2020 Details	(Japan); Tokyo	United States	18–15	ROC	China	16–14	France
2024 Details	(France); Paris	Germany	17–16	Spain	United States	16–13	Canada
2028 Details	(United States); Los Angeles						

=== Medal table ===
Rank	Nation	Gold	Silver	Bronze	Total
1	United States	1	0	1	2
2	Germany	1	0	0	1
3	ROC (ROC)	0	1	0	1
3	Spain	0	1	0	1
5	China	0	0	1	1
Totals (5 entries)		2	2	2	6

=== Participating nations ===
Nation	2020 (Japan)	2024 (France)	2028 (United States)	Years
Australia	•	5th		1
Azerbaijan	•	7th		1
Canada	•	4th		1
China	3rd	6th		2
France	4th	8th		2
Germany	•	1st		1
Italy	6th	•		1
Japan	5th	•		1
Mongolia	8th	•		1
ROC	2nd	•		1
Romania	7th	•		1
Spain	•	2nd		1
United States	1st	3rd	Q	3
Nations	8	8	12	

== Overall medal table ==
Rank	Nation	Gold	Silver	Bronze	Total
1	United States	1	0	1	2
2	Germany	1	0	0	1
2	Latvia	1	0	0	1
2	Netherlands	1	0	0	1
5	ROC (ROC)	0	2	0	2
6	France	0	1	0	1
6	Spain	0	1	0	1
8	China	0	0	1	1
8	Lithuania	0	0	1	1
8	Serbia	0	0	1	1
Totals (10 entries)		4	4	4	12

== See also ==
- Basketball at the Summer Olympics
