= FIBA 3x3 Champions Cup =

International 3x3 basketball tournament

- Sport: 3x3 basketball
- Founded: 2025
- No. of teams: 16
- Country: FIBA members
- Continent: FIBA (International)
- Most recent champions: United States (men); Netherlands (women)
- Most titles: Serbia; United States (men; 1 title); Canada; Netherlands (women; 1 title)

The FIBA 3x3 Champions Cup is a 3x3 basketball tournament for national teams organized by the International Basketball Federation (FIBA). The debut of the tournament was held in March 2025 in Bangkok, Thailand. The current champions are Serbia in the men's division and Canada in the women's division. It features the defending champion, the World Cup and continental cup winners, the host and the highest-ranked team(s).

== Men ==
=== Summary ===
Year	Hosts	Final			Third place match		
Year	Hosts	Champions	Score	Runners-up	Third place	Score	Fourth place
2025; Details	(Thailand); Bangkok	Serbia	17–16	Netherlands	Australia	21–20	United States
2026; Details	(Thailand); Bangkok	United States	19–14	Spain	Netherlands	20–17	Serbia

=== Medal table ===
Rank	Nation	Gold	Silver	Bronze	Total
1	Serbia	1	0	0	1
1	United States	1	0	0	1
3	Netherlands	0	1	1	2
4	Spain	0	1	0	1
5	Australia	0	0	1	1
Totals (5 entries)		2	2	2	6

=== Participating teams ===
Nation	(Thailand) 2025	(Thailand) 2026	Total
Australia	3rd	5th	2
Austria	6th		1
France	5th		1
Lithuania		6th	1
Madagascar	7th	8th	2
Netherlands	2nd	3rd	2
Serbia	1st	4th	2
Spain		2nd	1
Thailand	8th	7th	2
United States	4th	1st	2
Total	8	8	

== Women ==
=== Summary ===
Year	Hosts	Final			Third place match		
Year	Hosts	Champions	Score	Runners-up	Third place	Score	Fourth place
2025; Details	(Thailand); Bangkok	Canada	15–13	Spain	Australia	18–17	Germany
2026; Details	(Thailand); Bangkok	Netherlands	21–12	Azerbaijan	United States	20–10	Canada

=== Medal table ===
Rank	Nation	Gold	Silver	Bronze	Total
1	Canada	1	0	0	1
1	Netherlands	1	0	0	1
3	Azerbaijan	0	1	0	1
3	Spain	0	1	0	1
5	Australia	0	0	1	1
5	United States	0	0	1	1
Totals (6 entries)		2	2	2	6

=== Participating teams ===
Nation	(Thailand) 2025	(Thailand) 2026	Total
Australia	3rd	6th	2
Azerbaijan		2nd	1
Canada	1st	4th	2
China	6th		1
France	7th		1
Germany	4th		1
Madagascar	8th	8th	2
Netherlands		1st	1
Thailand	5th	7th	2
Spain	2nd	5th	2
United States		3rd	1
Total	8	8	

== Overall medal table ==
Rank	Nation	Gold	Silver	Bronze	Total
1	Netherlands	1	1	1	3
2	United States	1	0	1	2
3	Canada	1	0	0	1
3	Serbia	1	0	0	1
5	Spain	0	2	0	2
6	Azerbaijan	0	1	0	1
7	Australia	0	0	2	2
Totals (7 entries)		4	4	4	12

== See also ==
- FIBA 3x3 World Cup
- FIBA 3x3 Africa Cup
- FIBA 3x3 AmeriCup
- FIBA 3x3 Asia Cup
- FIBA 3x3 Europe Cup
