= 2023 FIBA 3x3 World Cup =

International 3x3 basketball event in Vienna

3×3-Weltmeisterschaft 2023

Tournament details
- Host country: Austria
- Cities: Vienna; 48.210814°N 16.358798°E
- Dates: 30 May – 4 June
- Teams: 40 (from 5 confederations)
- Venue: 1 (in 1 host city)

The 2023 FIBA 3x3 World Cup was an international 3x3 basketball event that featured competitions for men's and women's national teams. The tournament ran between 30 May and 4 June 2023 in Vienna, Austria.

== Medal summary ==
=== Medal table ===
* Host nation (Austria)

Rank	Nation	Gold	Silver	Bronze	Total
1	United States	1	1	0	2
2	Serbia	1	0	0	1
3	France	0	1	0	1
4	Australia	0	0	1	1
4	Latvia	0	0	1	1
Totals (5 entries)		2	2	2	6

=== Medalists ===
Event	Gold	Silver	Bronze
Men	Serbia; Marko Branković; Dejan Majstorović; Strahinja Stojačić; Mihailo Vasić	United States; Canyon Barry; Jimmer Fredette; Kareem Maddox; Dylan Travis	Latvia; Agnis Čavars; Francis Lācis; Kārlis Lasmanis; Nauris Miezis
Women	United States; Cameron Brink; Cierra Burdick; Linnae Harper; Hailey Van Lith	France; Myriam Djekoundade; Laëtitia Guapo; Hortense Limouzin; Marie-Ève Paget	Australia; Anneli Maley; Lauren Mansfield; Marena Whittle; Alex Wilson
