= Ukraine women's national 3x3 team =

Sports team

Ukraine
- Joined FIBA: 1992
- FIBA zone: FIBA Europe
- National federation: Ukrainian Basketball Federation

World Cup
- Appearances: 7
- Medals: Silver (2016), Bronze (2017)

Europe Cup
- Appearances: 9
- Medals: Bronze (2018)
Home	Away
Medal record
Representing Ukraine
World Cup
Silver medal – second place	2016 Guangzhou
Bronze medal – third place	2017 Nantes
Europe Cup
Silver medal – second place	2018 Bucharest
European Games
Silver medal – second place	2015 Baku	Team
World Mixed Championships
Bronze medal – third place	2012 Athens

The Ukrainian women's national 3x3 team represents Ukraine in international 3x3 basketball matches and is controlled by the Ukrainian Basketball Federation.

As of May 2021, Ukraine was especially known for their height. All four of their players were around 1.83m (6ft), taller than most rivals.

== Performances ==
=== World Cup ===
Year	Position	Pld	W	L
(Greece) 2012 Athens	4th	9	6	3
(Russia) 2014 Moscow	19th	5	1	4
(China) 2016 Guangzhou	2nd	7	5	2
(France) 2017 Nantes	3rd	7	5	2
(Philippines) 2018 Bocaue	Did not qualify			
(Netherlands) 2019 Amsterdam	14th	4	1	3
(Belgium) 2022 Antwerp	Did not qualify			
(Austria) 2023 Vienna	Did not qualify			
(Mongolia) 2025 Ulaanbaatar	18th	4	0	4
(Poland) 2026 Warsaw	6th	5	3	2
2027 Singapore	To be determined			
Total	7/11	41	21	20

=== Europe Cup ===
Year	Position	Pld	W	L
(Romania) 2014 Bucharest	9th	3	1	2
(Romania) 2016 Bucharest	6th	3	2	1
(Netherlands) 2017 Amsterdam	Did not qualify			
(Romania) 2018 Bucharest	3rd	5	3	2
(Hungary) 2019 Debrecen	8th	3	1	2
(France) 2021 Paris	7th	3	1	2
(Austria) 2022 Graz	Did not qualify			
(Israel) 2023 Jerusalem	10th	2	0	2
(Austria) 2024 Vienna	8th	3	1	2
(Denmark) 2025 Copenhagen	9th	2	0	2
(Belgium) 2026 Antwerp	12th	2	0	2
Total	9/11	26	9	17

=== European Games ===
Year	Position	Pld	W	L
(Azerbaijan) 2015 Baku	2nd	9	6	3
(Belarus) 2019 Minsk	9th	3	2	1
(Poland) 2023 Kraków	10th	3	1	2
Total	3/3	15	9	6

=== World Mixed Championships ===
Year	Position	Pld	W	L
2012 Greece	3rd	4	3	1
Total	1/1	4	3	1

== See also ==
- 3x3 basketball
- Ukraine men's national 3x3 team
