= Lithuania men's national 3x3 team =

Basketball team

Lithuania
- FIBA ranking: 3
- FIBA zone: FIBA Europe
- National federation: LKF

Olympic Games
- Appearances: 1
- Medals: Bronze: (2024)

World Cup
- Appearances: 6
- Medals: Silver (2022)

Europe Cup
- Appearances: 8
- Medals: Gold (2025); Silver (2021, 2023); Bronze (2014, 2019, 2024)

The Lithuania men's national 3x3 team is a national basketball team of Lithuania, administered by the Lithuanian Basketball Federation. It represents the country in international 3x3 (3 against 3) basketball competitions.

== Senior competitions ==
=== Summer Olympics ===
Year	Position	Pld	W	L	Players
(Japan) 2020 Tokyo	did not qualify				
(France) 2024 Paris	3rd	10	6	4	Vingelis, Matulis, Pukelis, Džiaugys
Total	1/2	10	6	4	

=== FIBA 3x3 World Cup ===
Year	Position	Pld	W	L
(Greece) 2012 Athens	did not qualify			
(Russia) 2014 Moscow	4th	9	6	3
(China) 2016 Guangzhou	did not qualify			
(France) 2017 Nantes	did not qualify			
(Philippines) 2018 Bocaue	did not qualify			
(Netherlands) 2019 Amsterdam	9th	4	2	2
(Belgium) 2022 Antwerp	2nd	7	6	1
(Austria) 2023 Vienna	10th	5	2	3
(Mongolia) 2025 Ulaanbaatar	16th	4	1	3
(Poland) 2026 Warsaw	5th	5	4	1
2027 Singapore	to be determined			
Total	6/11	34	21	13

=== Europe Cup ===
Year	Position	Pld	W	L	Players
(Romania) 2014 Bucharest	3rd (bronze)	6	5	1	Lukša, Marčiukaitis, Tarvydas, Varanauskas
(Romania) 2016 Bucharest	did not enter				
(Netherlands) 2017 Amsterdam	did not enter				
(Romania) 2018 Bucharest	did not qualify				
(Hungary) 2019 Debrecen	3rd (bronze)	5	4	1	Beliavičius, Pukelis, Užupis, Vingelis
(France) 2021 Paris	2nd (silver)	5	4	1	Pukelis, Razutis, Tarvydas, Vingelis
(Austria) 2022 Graz	4th	5	3	2	Džiaugys, Razutis, Tarvydas, Užupis
(Israel) 2023 Jerusalem	2nd (silver)	5	4	1	Džiaugys, Pukelis, Užupis, Vingelis
(Austria) 2024 Vienna	3rd (bronze)	5	3	2	Januševičius, Pukelis, Užupis, Čelka
(Denmark) 2025 Copenhagen	1st (gold)	5	4	1	Džiaugys, Pukelis, Užupis, Vaitkus
(Belgium) 2026 Antwerp	7th	3	1	2	Džiaugys, Sorokas, Vaitkus, Šaulys
Total	8/11	39	28	11	

=== European Games ===
Year	Position	Pld	W	L	Players
(Azerbaijan) 2015 Baku	8th	5	3	2	Lukša, Marčiukaitis, Tarvydas, Varanauskas
(Belarus) 2019 Minsk	6th	4	2	2	Bulanovas, Kuprijanovas, Pukelis, Semaška
(Poland) 2023 Kraków	7th	4	2	2	Rasys, Razutis, Vaitkus, Šulskis
Total	3/3	13	7	6	

=== Champions Cup ===
Year	Position	Pld	W	L
(Thailand) 2025 Bangkok	did not qualify			
(Thailand) 2026 Bangkok	6th	3	1	2
Total	1/2	3	1	2

== See also ==
- Lithuania national basketball team
