= Basketball at the 2015 European Games – Men's tournament =

Tournament details
- Host country: Azerbaijan
- City: Baku
- Dates: 23–26 June
- Teams: 16 (from 1 confederation)
- Venue: 1 (in 1 host city)

Final positions
- Champions: Russia (1st title)
- Runners-up: Spain
- Third place: Serbia
- Fourth place: Slovenia

The men's 3x3 basketball tournament at the 2015 European Games was held in Baku, Azerbaijan at the temporary Basketball Arena from 23 to 26 June.

== Medalists ==
| Gold | Silver | Bronze |
| Russia; Ilia Aleksandrov; Andrey Kanygin; Leopold Lagutin; Aleksandr Pavlov | Spain; Sergio de la Fuente; Álex Llorca; Nacho Martín; Juan Vasco | Serbia; Dušan Domović Bulut; Dejan Majstorović; Marko Savić; Marko Ždero |

== Team rosters ==
| Andorra | Azerbaijan | Belgium | Czech Republic |
|---|---|---|---|
| Rafa Casals; Oriol Fernández; Cinto Gabriel; Albert Ros | Rolandas Alijevas; Orhan Aydin Haciyeva; Amil Hamzayev; Marshall Obrian Moses | Nick Celis; Anthony Chada; Domien Loubry; Thierry Marien | Kamil Švrdlík; Jan Tomanec; Roman Zachrla; Filip Zbránek |
| Estonia | Greece | Israel | Italy |
| Martin Dorbek; Renato Lindmets; Ardi Oja; Siim Raudla | Grigoris Rallatos; Georgios Bogris; Epameinondas Papantoniou; Leonidas Kaselakis | Yoad Bet Yosef; Vladi Ermichin; Ofir Huber; Tom Stroosky | Andrea Iannilli; Claudio Negri; Damiano Verri; Gionata Zampolli |
| Lithuania | Romania | Russia | Serbia |
| Vitalij Lukša; Giedrius Marčiukaitis; Darius Tarvydas; Ovidijus Varanauskas | Cristian Crăciun; Bogdan Popescu; Cătălin Vlaicu; Angel Santana | Ilia Aleksandrov; Andrey Kanygin; Leopold Lagutin; Aleksandr Pavlov | Dušan Domović Bulut; Dejan Majstorović; Marko Savić; Marko Ždero |
| Slovenia | Spain | Switzerland | Turkey |
| Jure Eržen; Boris Jersin; Dario Krejič; Uroš Troppan | Sergio de la Fuente; Álex Llorca; Nacho Martín; Juan Vasco | Evrard Atcho; Westher Molteni; Nicola Stevanovic; Mathias Tolusso | Hasan Aksoyak; Enver Enis Ekmen; Mert Yavi; Ahmet Yılmaz |

== Preliminary round ==
=== Pool A ===
| Pos | Team | Pld | W | L | PF | PA | PD | Qualification |
|---|---|---|---|---|---|---|---|---|
| 1 | Slovenia | 3 | 3 | 0 | 51 | 35 | +16 | Round of 16 |
| 2 | Lithuania | 3 | 2 | 1 | 53 | 47 | +6 | Round of 16 |
| 3 | Romania | 3 | 1 | 2 | 46 | 47 | −1 | Round of 16 |
| 4 | Israel | 3 | 0 | 3 | 35 | 56 | −21 | Round of 16 |

Source: baku2015.com
Rules for classification: 1) Wins; 2) Head-to-head record; 3) Points scored; 4) Higher seed.

=== Pool B ===
| Pos | Team | Pld | W | L | PF | PA | PD | Qualification |
|---|---|---|---|---|---|---|---|---|
| 1 | Russia | 3 | 3 | 0 | 61 | 46 | +15 | Round of 16 |
| 2 | Spain | 3 | 2 | 1 | 55 | 41 | +14 | Round of 16 |
| 3 | Belgium | 3 | 1 | 2 | 46 | 61 | −15 | Round of 16 |
| 4 | Turkey | 3 | 0 | 3 | 47 | 61 | −14 | Round of 16 |

Source: baku2015.com
Rules for classification: 1) Wins; 2) Head-to-head record; 3) Points scored; 4) Higher seed.

=== Pool C ===
| Pos | Team | Pld | W | L | PF | PA | PD | Qualification |
|---|---|---|---|---|---|---|---|---|
| 1 | Serbia | 3 | 3 | 0 | 61 | 48 | +13 | Round of 16 |
| 2 | Greece | 3 | 2 | 1 | 47 | 47 | 0 | Round of 16 |
| 3 | Italy | 3 | 1 | 2 | 44 | 43 | +1 | Round of 16 |
| 4 | Estonia | 3 | 0 | 3 | 44 | 58 | −14 | Round of 16 |

Source: baku2015.com
Rules for classification: 1) Wins; 2) Head-to-head record; 3) Points scored; 4) Higher seed.

=== Pool D ===
| Pos | Team | Pld | W | L | PF | PA | PD | Qualification |
|---|---|---|---|---|---|---|---|---|
| 1 | Azerbaijan (H) | 3 | 3 | 0 | 54 | 37 | +17 | Round of 16 |
| 2 | Czech Republic | 3 | 2 | 1 | 55 | 38 | +17 | Round of 16 |
| 3 | Andorra | 3 | 1 | 2 | 41 | 50 | −9 | Round of 16 |
| 4 | Switzerland | 3 | 0 | 3 | 29 | 54 | −25 | Round of 16 |

Source: baku2015.com
Rules for classification: 1) Wins; 2) Head-to-head record; 3) Points scored; 4) Higher seed.
(H) Hosts

== Knockout round ==
=== Bracket ===
Round of 16
25 Jun
Slovenia | 16
Switzerland | 14
25 Jun
Greece | 21
Belgium | 12
25 Jun
Russia | 19
Estonia | 18
25 Jun
Czech Republic | 18
Romania | 16
25 Jun
Serbia | 21
Turkey | 13
25 Jun
Lithuania | 19
Andorra | 14
25 Jun
Azerbaijan | 19
Israel | 14
25 Jun
Spain | 22
Italy | 20

Quarter-finals
25 Jun
Slovenia | 18
Greece | 17
25 Jun
Russia | 21
Czech Republic | 18
25 Jun
Serbia | 17
Lithuania | 11
25 Jun
Azerbaijan | 14
Spain | 17

Semi-finals
26 Jun
Slovenia | 8
Russia | 21
26 Jun
Serbia | 16
Spain | 19

Final
26 Jun
Russia | 18
Spain | 14
Third place
26 Jun
Slovenia | 14
Serbia | 21

== See also ==
- Basketball at the 2015 European Games – Women's tournament
