= 2018 FIBA 3x3 Europe Cup =

Tournament information
- Location: Metropolitan Circus, Bucharest
- Dates: 14–16 September
- Host: Romania
- Teams: 24

The 2018 FIBA 3x3 Europe Cup was the fourth edition of the 3x3 Europe Championships, organized by FIBA Europe, and was held between 14 and 16 September 2018, in the city's Metropolitan Circus in Bucharest, Romania. This 3x3 basketball competition featured separate tournaments for men's and women's national teams. This was the third time that Bucharest had hosted the championships, after the 2014 FIBA Europe 3x3 Championships at the University Square and the 2016 FIBA Europe 3x3 Championships within the AFI Cotroceni shopping mall.

Serbia won their first European championship title in the men's tournament, by beating Latvia in the final. In the women's tournament, France won their first European championship title by beating the Netherlands in the final.

== Qualification ==
=== Men ===
Event	Date	Location	Berths	Qualified
Host nation			1	Romania
Andorra Qualifier	23–24 June	(Andorra) Escaldes-Engordany	3	Slovenia; Hungary; Switzerland
France Qualifier	29–30 June	(France) Poitiers	4	Russia; Belgium; Latvia; France
Romania Qualifier	30 June – 1 July	(Romania) Constanta	4	Serbia; Poland; Spain; Bosnia and Herzegovina
TOTAL			12	

=== Women ===
Event	Date	Location	Berths	Qualified
Host nation			1	Romania
Andorra Qualifier	23–24 June	(Andorra) Escaldes-Engordany	4	Italy; Serbia; Spain; Hungary
France Qualifier	29–30 June	(France) Poitiers	4	Ukraine; France; Czech Republic; Belarus
Romania Qualifier	30 June – 1 July	(Romania) Constanta	3	Switzerland; Belgium; Netherlands
TOTAL			12	

== Draw ==
Several qualifiers were held across three nations namely, Andorra, France, and the host country itself. The hosts, Romania, qualified automatically for both the men's and women's events. The draw of the groupings was announced by FIBA last 16 August 2018.

=== Men ===
Pool A

- Serbia
- Spain
- Bosnia and Herzegovina

Pool B

- Slovenia
- France
- Switzerland

Pool C

- Latvia
- Romania
- Hungary

Pool D

- Russia
- Poland
- Belgium

=== Women's ===
Pool A

- Ukraine
- Spain
- Switzerland

Pool B

- France
- Czech Republic
- Belarus

Pool C

- Netherlands
- Romania
- Serbia

Pool D

- Hungary
- Italy
- Belgium

== Medalists ==
Event	Gold	Silver	Bronze
Men's team	Serbia; Marko Branković; Dejan Majstorović; Strahinja Stojačić; Mihailo Vasić	Latvia; Agnis Čavars; Edgars Krūmiņš; Kārlis Lasmanis; Nauris Miezis	Netherlands; Jan Driessen; Julian Jaring; Arvin Slagter; Dimeo van der Horst
Women's team	France; Myriam Djekoundade; Laëtitia Guapo; Hortense Limouzin; Marie Mané	Netherlands; Loyce Bettonvil; Noortje Driessen; Julia Jorritsma; Natalie van den Adel	Ukraine; Krystyna Filevych; Olena Ogorodnikova; Anna Olkhovyk; Yevgenia Spitkovska
