= Azerbaijan women's national 3x3 team =

National 3x3 basketball team

Azerbaijan
- FIBA zone: FIBA Europe

Olympic Games
- Appearances: 1

World Cup
- Appearances: 1

Europe Cup
- Appearances: 3
- Medals: Silver : (2025); Bronze : (2026)

The Azerbaijan women's national 3x3 team is a national basketball team of Azerbaijan, administered by the Azerbaijan Basketball Federation.

It represents the country in international 3x3 (3 against 3) women's basketball competitions.

The team participated in the 2014 and 2016 FIBA Europe 3x3 Championships, but didn't advance beyond the quarter finals.
The team was more successful in the Islamic Solidarity Games, winning the gold medal in both the 2017 and 2021 Islamic Solidarity Games.

In April 2024, the team, centered around American-Azerbaijani professional basketball player Tiffany Hayes, won the 2024 Summer Olympics qualification tournament in Hong Kong, and qualified for the Olympic Games for the first time in its history.

== Tournament record ==
=== Summer Olympics ===
Year	Position	Pld	W	L	Players
(Japan) 2020 Tokyo	Did not qualify				
(France) 2024 Paris	7th	7	2	5	Ulyanova, Hayes, Mollenhauer, Walker
Total	1/2	7	2	5	

=== World Cup ===
Year	Position	Pld	W	L
(Greece) 2012 Athens	Did not qualify			
(Russia) 2014 Moscow	Did not qualify			
(China) 2016 Guangzhou	Did not qualify			
(France) 2017 Nantes	Did not qualify			
(Philippines) 2018 Bocaue	Did not qualify			
(Netherlands) 2019 Amsterdam	Did not qualify			
(Belgium) 2022 Antwerp	Did not qualify			
(Austria) 2023 Vienna	Did not qualify			
(Mongolia) 2025 Ulaanbaatar	Did not qualify			
(Poland) 2026 Warsaw	4th	8	5	3
2027 Singapore	To be determined			
Total	1/11	8	5	3

=== Europe Cup ===
Year	Position	Pld	W	L
(Romania) 2014 Bucharest	Did not qualify			
(Romania) 2016 Bucharest	Did not qualify			
(Netherlands) 2017 Amsterdam	Did not qualify			
(Romania) 2018 Bucharest	Did not qualify			
(Hungary) 2019 Debrecen	Did not qualify			
(France) 2021 Paris	Did not qualify			
(Austria) 2022 Graz	Did not qualify			
(Israel) 2023 Jerusalem	Did not qualify			
(Austria) 2024 Vienna	11th	2	0	2
(Denmark) 2025 Copenhagen	2nd	5	4	1
(Belgium) 2026 Antwerp	3rd	5	3	2
Total	3/11	12	7	5

=== Champions Cup ===
Year	Position	Pld	W	L
(Thailand) 2025 Bangkok	did not qualify			
(Thailand) 2026 Bangkok	2nd	5	3	2
Total	1/1	5	3	2

== See also ==
- Azerbaijan women's national basketball team
