= 2021 FIBA 3x3 Europe Cup =

European basketball tournament

Tournament information
- Location: Paris
- Dates: 10–12 September 2021
- Host: France

The 2021 FIBA 3x3 Europe Cup was the sixth edition of the European 3x3 basketball event that featured separate competitions for men's and women's national teams. It was held between 10 and 12 September 2021 in Paris, France.

== Qualification ==
The qualification events took place in 25-26 June in Tel Aviv, Israel and 26-27 June in Constanta, Romania, respectively. Twelve men's teams and 12 women's team qualified for the final tournament. In the men's, host France, 2019 champs Serbia, Russia and Slovenia have qualified based on ranking. In the women's, host and 2019 champs France, Russia, Netherlands and Romania are automatically through. In each qualifying tournament, four men's teams and four women's teams earned spots for the final event.

== Medalists ==
Event	Gold	Silver	Bronze
Men's team	Serbia; Dejan Majstorović; Miroslav Pašajlić; Aleksandar Ratkov; Mihailo Vasić	Lithuania; Aurelijus Pukelis; Ignas Razutis; Darius Tarvydas; Šarūnas Vingelis	Poland; Łukasz Diduszko; Paweł Pawłowski; Szymon Rduch; Przemysław Zamojski
Women's team	Spain; Marta Canella; Aitana Cuevas; Vega Gimeno; Sandra Ygueravide	Germany; Svenja Brunckhorst; Sonja Greinacher; Katharina Müller; Luana Rodefeld	France; Laëtitia Guapo; Soana Lucet; Marie-Ève Paget; Migna Touré

== Men's tournament ==
=== Preliminary round ===
Pool A

Pos	Team	Pld	W	L	PF	PA	PD	PCT	Qualification	(Serbia)	(Ukraine)	(Belgium)
1	Serbia	2	1	1	37	33	+4	.500	Quarterfinals	—	17–21	20–12
2	Ukraine	2	1	1	31	28	+3	.500	Quarterfinals	21–17	—	10–11
3	Belgium	2	1	1	23	30	−7	.500		12–20	11–10	—

Source: fiba basketball
Rules for classification: 1) Wins; 2) Head-to-head record; 3) Points scored; 4) Higher seed.

Pool B

Pos	Team	Pld	W	L	PF	PA	PD	PCT	Qualification	(Poland)	(Estonia)	(Slovenia)
1	Poland	2	2	0	41	32	+9	1.000	Quarterfinals	—	20–18	21–14
2	Estonia	2	1	1	37	37	0	.500	Quarterfinals	18–20	—	19–17
3	Slovenia	2	0	2	31	40	−9	.000		14–21	17–19	—

Source: fiba basketball
Rules for classification: 1) Wins; 2) Head-to-head record; 3) Points scored; 4) Higher seed.

Pool C

Pos	Team	Pld	W	L	PF	PA	PD	PCT	Qualification	(Lithuania)	(France)	(Austria)
1	Lithuania	2	2	0	39	32	+7	1.000	Quarterfinals	—	21–19	18–13
2	France (H)	2	1	1	40	35	+5	.500	Quarterfinals	19–21	—	21–14
3	Austria	2	0	2	27	39	−12	.000		13–18	14–21	—

Source: fiba basketball
Rules for classification: 1) Wins; 2) Head-to-head record; 3) Points scored; 4) Higher seed.
(H) Hosts

Pool D

Pos	Team	Pld	W	L	PF	PA	PD	PCT	Qualification	(Russia)	(Netherlands)	(Israel)
1	Russia	2	2	0	41	36	+5	1.000	Quarterfinals	—	20–19	21–17
2	Netherlands	2	1	1	40	33	+7	.500	Quarterfinals	19–20	—	21–13
3	Israel	2	0	2	30	42	−12	.000		17–21	13–21	—

Source: fiba basketball
Rules for classification: 1) Wins; 2) Head-to-head record; 3) Points scored; 4) Higher seed.

=== Knockout stage ===
All times are local.

Quarter-finals
12 Sep 2021 – 15:10
Serbia	20
France	17
12 Sep 2021 – 15:35
Russia	19
Estonia	16
12 Sep 2021 – 17:00
Poland	21
Netherlands	14
12 Sep 2021 – 17:25
Lithuania	21
Ukraine	9

Semi-finals
12 Sep 2021 – 19:20
Serbia	18
Russia	13
12 Sep 2021 – 19:45
Poland	10
Lithuania	19

Final
12 Sep 2021 – 22:05
Serbia	20
Lithuania	14
Bronze medal
12 Sep 2021 – 21:05
Russia	18
Poland	19

=== Final standings ===
Pos	Team	Pld	W	L	PF
1	Serbia	5	5	0	95
2	Lithuania	5	4	1	93
3	Poland	5	4	1	91
4	Russia	5	3	2	91
5	France	3	1	2	57
6	Netherlands	3	1	2	54
7	Estonia	3	1	2	53
8	Ukraine	3	1	2	40
9	Belgium	2	1	1	23
10	Slovenia	2	0	2	31
11	Israel	2	0	2	30
12	Austria	2	0	2	27

== Women's tournament ==
=== Preliminary round ===
Pool A

Pos	Team	Pld	W	L	PF	PA	PD	PCT	Qualification	(France)	(Germany)	(Israel)
1	France (H)	2	2	0	43	22	+21	1.000	Quarterfinals	—	21–12	22–10
2	Germany	2	1	1	31	35	−4	.500	Quarterfinals	12–21	—	19–14
3	Israel	2	0	2	24	41	−17	.000		10–22	14–19	—

Source: fiba basketball
Rules for classification: 1) Wins; 2) Head-to-head record; 3) Points scored; 4) Higher seed.
(H) Hosts

Pool B

Pos	Team	Pld	W	L	PF	PA	PD	PCT	Qualification	(Russia)	(Ukraine)	(United Kingdom)
1	Russia	2	2	0	36	30	+6	1.000	Quarterfinals	—	21–18	15–12
2	Ukraine	2	1	1	38	39	−1	.500	Quarterfinals	18–21	—	20–18
3	Great Britain	2	0	2	30	35	−5	.000		12–15	18–20	—

Source: fiba basketball
Rules for classification: 1) Wins; 2) Head-to-head record; 3) Points scored; 4) Higher seed.

Pool C

Pos	Team	Pld	W	L	PF	PA	PD	PCT	Qualification	(Hungary)	(Romania)	(Belgium)
1	Hungary	2	2	0	29	26	+3	1.000	Quarterfinals	—	13–12	16–14
2	Romania	2	1	1	29	27	+2	.500	Quarterfinals	12–13	—	17–14
3	Belgium	2	0	2	28	33	−5	.000		14–16	14–17	—

Source: fiba basketball
Rules for classification: 1) Wins; 2) Head-to-head record; 3) Points scored; 4) Higher seed.

Pool D

Pos	Team	Pld	W	L	PF	PA	PD	PCT	Qualification	(Spain)	(Lithuania)	(Netherlands)
1	Spain	2	1	1	40	35	+5	.500	Quarterfinals	—	19–21	21–14
2	Lithuania	2	1	1	40	40	0	.500	Quarterfinals	21–19	—	19–21
3	Netherlands	2	1	1	35	40	−5	.500		14–21	21–19	—

Source: fiba basketball
Rules for classification: 1) Wins; 2) Head-to-head record; 3) Points scored; 4) Higher seed.

=== Knockout stage ===
All times are local.

Quarter-finals
12 Sep 2021 – 16:05
France	17
Romania	8
12 Sep 2021 – 16:30
Spain	22
Ukraine	10
12 Sep 2021 – 14:15
Russia	16
Lithuania	15
12 Sep 2021 – 14:40
Hungary	10
Germany	11

Semi-finals
12 Sep 2021 – 18:50
France	17
Spain	21
12 Sep 2021 – 18:25
Russia	12
Germany	14

Final
12 Sep 2021 – 21:40
Spain	16
Germany	12
Bronze medal
12 Sep 2021 – 20:40
France	19
Russia	13

=== Final standings ===
Pos	Team	Pld	W	L	PF
1	Spain	5	5	0	99
2	Germany	5	3	2	68
3	France	5	4	1	96
4	Russia	5	3	2	77
5	Hungary	3	2	1	39
6	Lithuania	3	1	2	55
7	Ukraine	3	1	2	48
8	Romania	3	1	2	37
9	Netherlands	2	0	2	35
10	Great Britain	2	0	2	30
11	Belgium	2	0	2	28
12	Israel	2	0	2	24
