= Serbia men's national 3x3 team =

Serbia
- FIBA ranking: 1
- FIBA zone: FIBA Europe
- National federation: KSS
- Coach: Marko Ždero
- Nickname: Orlovi (The Eagles)

Olympic Games
- Appearances: 2
- Medals: (bronze) Bronze: (2020)

World Cup
- Appearances: 11
- Medals: Gold: (2012, 2016, 2017, 2018, 2022, 2023); Silver: (2014); Bronze: (2025, 2026)

Europe Cup
- Appearances: 11
- Medals: Gold: (2018, 2019, 2021, 2022, 2023); Silver: (2016, 2024)

European Games
- Appearances: 3
- Medals: Bronze: (2015)

FIBA 3x3 Champions Cup
- Appearances: 2
- Medals: Gold: (2025)
Home	Away
Medal record
Men's 3x3 basketball
Representing Serbia
Olympic Games
Bronze medal – third place	2020 Tokyo
World Cup
Gold medal – first place	2012 Greece
Gold medal – first place	2016 China	Team
Gold medal – first place	2017 France	Team
Gold medal – first place	2018 Philippines	Team
Gold medal – first place	2022 Belgium	Team
Gold medal – first place	2023 Vienna	Team
Silver medal – second place	2014 Russia	Team
Bronze medal – third place	2025 Mongolia	Team
Bronze medal – third place	2026 Poland	Team
Champions Cup
First place	2025 Bangkok	Team
European Cup
Gold medal – first place	2018 Romania
Gold medal – first place	2019 Hungary
Gold medal – first place	2021 France
Gold medal – first place	2022 Austria
Gold medal – first place	2023 Israel
Silver medal – second place	2016 Romania
Silver medal – second place	2024 Austria
European Games
Bronze medal – third place	2015 Baku	Team
Mediterranean Games
Silver medal – second place	2022 Oran	Team

The Serbian men's national 3x3 team (Serbian: Мушка репрезентација Србије у баскету 3x3) represents Serbia in international 3x3 basketball matches and is controlled by the Basketball Federation of Serbia.

== Honours ==
Event	Gold	Silver	Bronze	Total
Olympic Games	0	0	1	1
3x3 World Cup	6	1	2	9
3x3 Europe Cup	5	2	0	7
European Games	0	0	1	1
Mediterranean Games	0	1	0	1
3x3 Champions Cup	1	0	0	1
Total	12	4	4	20

=== Individual awards ===
- FIBA World Cup MVP
  - Dušan Domović Bulut – 2016, 2018
  - Dejan Majstorović – 2017, 2022
  - Strahinja Stojačić – 2023
- FIBA World Cup All-Tournament Team
  - Dušan Domović Bulut – 2016, 2017, 2018
  - Dejan Majstorović – 2017, 2022
  - Strahinja Stojačić – 2023, 2025, 2026
- FIBA Champions Cup MVP
  - Stefan Milivojević – 2025
- FIBA Champions Cup All-Tournament Team
  - Stefan Milivojević – 2025
- FIBA 3x3 Europe Cup MVP
  - Dušan Domović Bulut – 2018
  - Miroslav Pašajlić – 2021
  - Dejan Majstorović – 2022
  - Strahinja Stojačić – 2023
- FIBA 3x3 Europe Cup All-Tournament Team
  - Dušan Domović Bulut – 2018
  - Miroslav Pašajlić – 2021
  - Strahinja Stojačić – 2023, 2024

== Competitions ==
=== Summer Olympics ===
Year	Position	Pld	W	L	Players
(Japan) 2020 Tokyo	3rd	9	8	1	Domović Bulut, Majstorović, Ratkov, Vasić
(France) 2024 Paris	5th	8	4	4	Branković, Majstorović, Stojačić, Vasić
(United States) 2028 Los Angeles	Future competitions				
(Australia) 2032 Brisbane	Future competitions				
Total	2/2	17	12	5	

=== World Cup ===
Year	Position	Pld	W	L	Players
(Greece) 2012 Athens	1st	9	8	1	Bošković, Domović Bulut, Savić, Ždero
(Russia) 2014 Moscow	2nd	9	7	2	Domović Bulut, Majstorović, Savić, Ždero
(China) 2016 Guangzhou	1st	7	7	0	Domović Bulut, Majstorović, Savić, Ždero
(France) 2017 Nantes	1st	7	7	0	Domović Bulut, Majstorović, Savić, Ždero
(Philippines) 2018 Bocaue	1st	7	7	0	Domović Bulut, Majstorović, Savić, Stojačić
(Netherlands) 2019 Amsterdam	4th	7	4	3	Domović Bulut, Majstorović, Savić, Vasić
(Belgium) 2022 Antwerp	1st	7	7	0	Branković, Majstorović, Stojačić, Vasić
(Austria) 2023 Vienna	1st	7	7	0	Branković, Majstorović, Stojačić, Vasić
(Mongolia) 2025 Ulaanbaatar	3rd	7	5	2	Barać, Branković, Majstorović, Stojačić
(Poland) 2026 Warsaw	3rd	7	6	1	Barać, Milutinović, Nerandžić, Stojačić
2027 Singapore	To be determined				
Total	10/11	74	65	9	

=== Champions Cup ===
Year	Position	Pld	W	L	Players
(Thailand) 2025 Bangkok	1st	5	5	0	Branković, Milaković, Milivojević, Nerandžić
(Thailand) 2026 Bangkok	4th	5	3	2	Branković, Kaluđerović, Milivojević, Nerandžić
Total	2/2	10	8	2	

=== Europe Cup ===
Year	Position	Pld	W	L	Players
2014 Romania	5th	4	3	1	Domović Bulut, Majstorović, Savić, Ždero
2016 Romania	2nd (silver)	5	4	1	Domović Bulut, Majstorović, Savić, Ždero
2017 Netherlands	4th	5	3	2	Domović Bulut, Majstorović, Mijatović, Savić
2018 Romania	1st (gold)	5	5	0	Domović Bulut, Majstorović, Savić, Ždero
2019 Hungary	1st (gold)	5	5	0	Domović Bulut, Majstorović, Mijatović, Savić
2021 France	1st (gold)	5	4	1	Majstorović, Pašajlić, Ratkov, Vasić
2022 Austria	1st (gold)	5	5	0	Branković, Majstorović, Stojačić, Vasić
2023 Israel	1st (gold)	5	5	0	Barać, Branković, Kojić, Stojačić
2024 Austria	2nd (silver)	5	3	2	Barać, Branković, Kojić, Stojačić
2025 Denmark	7th	3	2	1	Barać, Branković, Nerandžić, Stojačić
2026 Belgium	4th	5	3	2	Simeunović, Branković, Nerandžić, Stojačić
Total	11/11	47	39	8	

=== European Games ===
Year	Position	Pld	W	L	Players
(Azerbaijan) 2015 Baku	3rd (bronze)	7	6	1	Domović Bulut, Majstorović, Savić, Ždero
(Belarus) 2019 Minsk	5th	4	3	1	Dugošija, Rašić, Vuković, Ždero
(Poland) 2023 Kraków	GS	3	0	3	Borovićanin, Dautović, Kovačević, Milaković
Total	3/3	14	9	5	

=== Mediterranean Games ===
Year	Position	Pld	W	L	Players
(Spain) 2018 Tarragona	QF	3	2	1	Milaković, Simić, Stefanović, Šućov
(Algeria) 2022 Oran	2nd (silver)	5	4	1	Antić, Kovačević, Momirov, Stanković
(Italy) 2026 Taranto	withdrew				
Total	2/3	8	6	2	

== Team ==
=== Current roster ===
The following is the Serbia roster for the 2024 Summer Olympics.

Serbia men's national 3x3 team – 2024 Summer Olympics roster
Players
Coaches

Pos.	No.	Name	Age – Date of birth	Height	Club	Ctr.
G/F	5	Strahinja Stojačić	32 – July 15, 1992	1.98 m (6 ft 6 in)	Ub	(Serbia)
G/F	8	Dejan Majstorović	36 – April 22, 1988	2.00 m (6 ft 7 in)	Ub	(Serbia)
G/F	9	Mihailo Vasić	31 – July 20, 1993	2.00 m (6 ft 7 in)	Liman	(Serbia)
G/F	11	Marko Branković	29 – August 12, 1994	2.00 m (6 ft 7 in)	Ub	(Serbia)

Head coach

- (Serbia) Goran Vojkić

Assistant coach(es)

- (Serbia) Marko Ždero
- (Serbia) Danilo Lukić

Legend

- (C) Team captain
- (R) Reserves
- Age – describes age
  on 30 July 2024

== See also ==
- Serbia women's national 3x3 team
- Serbia men's national under-18 3x3 team
- Serbia men's national basketball team
