= 2023 FIBA 3x3 Europe Cup =

European basketball tournament

Tournament information
- Location: Jerusalem
- Dates: 5–7 September 2023
- Host: Israel

The 2023 FIBA 3x3 Europe Cup was the eighth edition of the 3x3 Europe Cup that featured separate competitions for men's and women's national teams. It was held between 5 and 7 September 2023 in Jerusalem, Israel.

== Medalists ==
| Event | Gold | Silver | Bronze |
|---|---|---|---|
| Men's team | Serbia; Nemanja Barać; Marko Branković; Stefan Kojić; Strahinja Stojačić | Lithuania; Evaldas Džiaugys; Aurelijus Pukelis; Marijus Užupis; Šarūnas Vingelis | Latvia; Francis Lācis; Kārlis Lasmanis; Mārcis Osis; Zigmārs Raimo |
| Women's team | Netherlands; Loyce Bettonvil; Janis Boonstra; Noortje Driessen; Kiki Fleuren | Spain; Gracia Alonso; Juana Camilion; Vega Gimeno; Sandra Ygueravide | Lithuania; Giedrė Labuckienė; Martyna Petrėnaitė; Kamilė Nacickaitė; Gabrielė Šulskė |

== Men's tournament ==
=== Preliminary round ===
Pool A

| Pos | Team | Pld | W | L | PF | PA | PD | PCT | Qualification | (Serbia) | (Austria) | (Israel) |
|---|---|---|---|---|---|---|---|---|---|---|---|---|
| 1 | Serbia | 2 | 2 | 0 | 43 | 39 | +4 | 1.000 | Quarterfinals | — | 21–20 | 22–19 |
| 2 | Austria | 2 | 1 | 1 | 41 | 31 | +10 | .500 | Quarterfinals | 20–21 | — | 21–10 |
| 3 | Israel | 2 | 0 | 2 | 29 | 43 | −14 | .000 | | 19–22 | 10–21 | — |

Source: FIBA basketball
Rules for classification: 1) Wins; 2) Head-to-head record; 3) Points scored; 4) Higher seed.

Pool B

| Pos | Team | Pld | W | L | PF | PA | PD | PCT | Qualification | (Lithuania) | (Czech Republic) | (Germany) |
|---|---|---|---|---|---|---|---|---|---|---|---|---|
| 1 | Lithuania | 2 | 2 | 0 | 42 | 26 | +16 | 1.000 | Quarterfinals | — | 21–13 | 21–13 |
| 2 | Czech Republic | 2 | 1 | 1 | 33 | 39 | −6 | .500 | Quarterfinals | 13–21 | — | 20–18 |
| 3 | Germany | 2 | 0 | 2 | 31 | 41 | −10 | .000 | | 13–21 | 18–20 | — |

Source: FIBA basketball
Rules for classification: 1) Wins; 2) Head-to-head record; 3) Points scored; 4) Higher seed.

Pool C

| Pos | Team | Pld | W | L | PF | PA | PD | PCT | Qualification | (France) | (Netherlands) | (Croatia) |
|---|---|---|---|---|---|---|---|---|---|---|---|---|
| 1 | France | 2 | 2 | 0 | 42 | 25 | +17 | 1.000 | Quarterfinals | — | 21–13 | 21–12 |
| 2 | Netherlands | 2 | 1 | 1 | 34 | 34 | 0 | .500 | Quarterfinals | 13–21 | — | 21–13 |
| 3 | Croatia | 2 | 0 | 2 | 25 | 42 | −17 | .000 | | 12–21 | 13–21 | — |

Source: FIBA basketball
Rules for classification: 1) Wins; 2) Head-to-head record; 3) Points scored; 4) Higher seed.

Pool D

| Pos | Team | Pld | W | L | PF | PA | PD | PCT | Qualification | (Latvia) | (Belgium) | (Cyprus) |
|---|---|---|---|---|---|---|---|---|---|---|---|---|
| 1 | Latvia | 2 | 2 | 0 | 43 | 25 | +18 | 1.000 | Quarterfinals | — | 21–15 | 22–10 |
| 2 | Belgium | 2 | 1 | 1 | 37 | 24 | +13 | .500 | Quarterfinals | 15–21 | — | 22–3 |
| 3 | Cyprus | 2 | 0 | 2 | 13 | 44 | −31 | .000 | | 10–22 | 3–22 | — |

Source: FIBA basketball
Rules for classification: 1) Wins; 2) Head-to-head record; 3) Points scored; 4) Higher seed.

=== Knockout stage ===
All times are local.

Quarter-finals
7 Sep 2023 – 10:20
Serbia | 21
Netherlands | 19
7 Sep 2023 – 10:45
Latvia | 17
Czech Republic | 11
7 Sep 2023 – 12:10
Lithuania | 21
Belgium | 12
7 Sep 2023 – 12:35
France | 21
Austria | 16

Semi-finals
7 Sep 2023 – 18:30
Serbia | 21
Latvia | 18
7 Sep 2023 – 18:55
Lithuania | 21
France | 16

Final
7 Sep 2023 – 20:55
Serbia | 22
Lithuania | 20
Bronze medal
7 Sep 2023 – 19:55
Latvia | 22
France | 19

=== Final standings ===
| Pos | Team | Pld | W | L | PF |
|---|---|---|---|---|---|
| 1 | Serbia | 5 | 5 | 0 | 107 |
| 2 | Lithuania | 5 | 4 | 1 | 104 |
| 3 | Latvia | 5 | 4 | 1 | 100 |
| 4 | France | 5 | 3 | 2 | 98 |
| 5 | Austria | 3 | 1 | 2 | 57 |
| 6 | Netherlands | 3 | 1 | 2 | 53 |
| 7 | Belgium | 3 | 1 | 2 | 49 |
| 8 | Czech Republic | 3 | 1 | 2 | 44 |
| 9 | Germany | 2 | 0 | 2 | 31 |
| 10 | Israel | 2 | 0 | 2 | 29 |
| 11 | Croatia | 2 | 0 | 2 | 25 |
| 12 | Cyprus | 2 | 0 | 2 | 13 |

== Women's tournament ==
=== Preliminary round ===
Pool A

| Pos | Team | Pld | W | L | PF | PA | PD | PCT | Qualification | (France) | (Czech Republic) | (Ukraine) |
|---|---|---|---|---|---|---|---|---|---|---|---|---|
| 1 | France | 2 | 2 | 0 | 39 | 20 | +19 | 1.000 | Quarterfinals | — | 20–10 | 19–10 |
| 2 | Czech Republic | 2 | 1 | 1 | 31 | 37 | −6 | .500 | Quarterfinals | 10–20 | — | 21–17 |
| 3 | Ukraine | 2 | 0 | 2 | 27 | 40 | −13 | .000 | | 10–19 | 17–21 | — |

Source: FIBA basketball
Rules for classification: 1) Wins; 2) Head-to-head record; 3) Points scored; 4) Higher seed.

Pool B

| Pos | Team | Pld | W | L | PF | PA | PD | PCT | Qualification | (Italy) | (Germany) | (Israel) |
|---|---|---|---|---|---|---|---|---|---|---|---|---|
| 1 | Italy | 2 | 2 | 0 | 39 | 28 | +11 | 1.000 | Quarterfinals | — | 17–10 | 22–18 |
| 2 | Germany | 2 | 1 | 1 | 25 | 30 | −5 | .500 | Quarterfinals | 10–17 | — | 15–13 |
| 3 | Israel | 2 | 0 | 2 | 31 | 37 | −6 | .000 | | 18–22 | 13–15 | — |

Source: FIBA basketball
Rules for classification: 1) Wins; 2) Head-to-head record; 3) Points scored; 4) Higher seed.

Pool C

| Pos | Team | Pld | W | L | PF | PA | PD | PCT | Qualification | (Lithuania) | (Portugal) | (Hungary) |
|---|---|---|---|---|---|---|---|---|---|---|---|---|
| 1 | Lithuania | 2 | 2 | 0 | 36 | 29 | +7 | 1.000 | Quarterfinals | — | 15–13 | 21–16 |
| 2 | Portugal | 2 | 1 | 1 | 29 | 25 | +4 | .500 | Quarterfinals | 13–15 | — | 16–10 |
| 3 | Hungary | 2 | 0 | 2 | 26 | 37 | −11 | .000 | | 16–21 | 10–16 | — |

Source: FIBA basketball
Rules for classification: 1) Wins; 2) Head-to-head record; 3) Points scored; 4) Higher seed.

Pool D

| Pos | Team | Pld | W | L | PF | PA | PD | PCT | Qualification | (Netherlands) | (Spain) | (Luxembourg) |
|---|---|---|---|---|---|---|---|---|---|---|---|---|
| 1 | Netherlands | 2 | 2 | 0 | 39 | 23 | +16 | 1.000 | Quarterfinals | — | 21–15 | 18–8 |
| 2 | Spain | 2 | 1 | 1 | 36 | 31 | +5 | .500 | Quarterfinals | 15–21 | — | 21–10 |
| 3 | Luxembourg | 2 | 0 | 2 | 18 | 39 | −21 | .000 | | 8–18 | 10–21 | — |

Source: FIBA basketball
Rules for classification: 1) Wins; 2) Head-to-head record; 3) Points scored; 4) Higher seed.

=== Knockout stage ===
All times are local.

Quarter-finals
7 Sep 2023 – 9:30
France | 7
Portugal | 13
7 Sep 2023 – 9:55
Netherlands | 12
Germany | 10
7 Sep 2023 – 11:20
Italy | 9
Spain | 21
7 Sep 2023 – 11:45
Lithuania | 21
Czech Republic | 14

Semi-finals
7 Sep 2023 – 17:30
Portugal | 13
Netherlands | 19
7 Sep 2023 – 17:55
Spain | 21
Lithuania | 6

Final
7 Sep 2023 – 20:30
Netherlands | 21
Spain | 18
Bronze medal
7 Sep 2023 – 19:30
Portugal | 14
Lithuania | 22
