= Basketball at the 2015 European Games – Women's tournament =

Tournament details
- Host country: Azerbaijan
- City: Baku
- Dates: 23–26 June
- Teams: 16 (from 1 confederation)
- Venue: 1 (in 1 host city)

Final positions
- Champions: Russia (1st title)
- Runners-up: Ukraine
- Third place: Spain
- Fourth place: Slovenia

The women's 3x3 basketball tournament at the 2015 European Games was held in Baku, Azerbaijan at the temporary Basketball Arena from 23 to 26 June.

== Medalists ==
Gold	Silver	Bronze
Russia; Tatiana Petrushina; Tatiana Vidmer; Mariia Cherepanova; Anna Leshkovtseva	Ukraine; Viktoriia Paziuk; Krystyna Matsko; Olga Maznichenko; Ganna Zarytska	Spain; Vega Gimeno; Arantxa Novo; Esther Montenegro; Inmaculada Zanoguera

== Team rosters ==
Azerbaijan	Belgium	Czech Republic	Greece
Tatyana Deniskina; Renara Tiffany Hayes; Aneika Henry; Dina Ulyanova	Hind Ben Abdelkader; Sara Leemans; Anne-Sophie Strubbe; Ann Wauters	Romana Stehlíková; Veronika Vlková; Tereza Vorlová; Kateřina Zavázalová	Aikaterini Spatharou; Nafsika Stavridou; Afroditi Kosma; Vasiliki Zuzana Karampatsa
Ireland	Israel	Lithuania	Netherlands
Grainne Dwyer; Niamh Dwyer; Suzanne Maguire; Orla O'Reilly	Hadar Gutin; Maya Isseroff; Limor Pelleg; Nofar Shalom	Kristina Alminaitė; Kornelija Balčiūnaitė; Erika Liutkutė; Eglė Tarasevičiūtė	Sharon Beld; Jinga Gosschalk; Karen Heinen; Karin Kuijt
Romania	Russia	Slovakia	Slovenia
Andra Haas; Gabriela Mărginean; Anca Şipoş; Sonia Ursu	Tatiana Petrushina; Tatiana Vidmer; Mariia Cherepanova; Anna Leshkovtseva	Alexandra Pribulová; Alexandra Riecka; Zuzana Mračnová; Dominika Baburová	Ana Ljubenović; Maša Piršič; Živa Zdolšek; Urša Žibert
Spain	Switzerland	Turkey	Ukraine
Vega Gimeno; Arantxa Novo; Esther Montenegro; Inmaculada Zanoguera	Sarah Kershaw; Marielle Giroud; Alexia Rol; Dorothée Studer	Dila Aşkin; Nihan Demirkol; Duygu Fırat; İrem Tulgar	Viktoriia Paziuk; Krystyna Matsko; Olga Maznichenko; Ganna Zarytska

== Preliminary round ==
=== Pool A ===
Pos	Team	Pld	W	L	PF	PA	PD	Qualification
1	Switzerland	3	3	0	49	42	+7	Round of 16
2	Azerbaijan (H)	3	2	1	46	40	+6	Round of 16
3	Greece	3	1	2	44	47	−3	Round of 16
4	Netherlands	3	0	3	33	43	−10	Round of 16

Source: baku2015.com
Rules for classification: 1) Wins; 2) Head-to-head record; 3) Points scored; 4) Higher seed.
(H) Hosts

=== Pool B ===
Pos	Team	Pld	W	L	PF	PA	PD	Qualification
1	Ukraine	3	3	0	51	34	+17	Round of 16
2	Czech Republic	3	2	1	51	36	+15	Round of 16
3	Belgium	3	1	2	46	45	+1	Round of 16
4	Turkey	3	0	3	26	59	−33	Round of 16

Source: baku2015.com
Rules for classification: 1) Wins; 2) Head-to-head record; 3) Points scored; 4) Higher seed.

=== Pool C ===
Pos	Team	Pld	W	L	PF	PA	PD	Qualification
1	Spain	3	3	0	53	27	+26	Round of 16
2	Slovenia	3	2	1	39	37	+2	Round of 16
3	Ireland	3	1	2	41	47	−6	Round of 16
4	Slovakia	3	0	3	27	49	−22	Round of 16

Source: baku2015.com
Rules for classification: 1) Wins; 2) Head-to-head record; 3) Points scored; 4) Higher seed.

=== Pool D ===
Pos	Team	Pld	W	L	PF	PA	PD	Qualification
1	Russia	3	2	1	58	41	+17	Round of 16
2	Romania	3	2	1	54	39	+15	Round of 16
3	Lithuania	3	2	1	47	42	+5	Round of 16
4	Israel	3	0	3	23	60	−37	Round of 16

Source: baku2015.com
Rules for classification: 1) Wins; 2) Head-to-head record; 3) Points scored; 4) Higher seed.

== Knockout round ==
=== Bracket ===
Round of 16
25 Jun
Switzerland	14
Israel	7
25 Jun
Slovenia	14
Belgium	11
25 Jun
Ukraine	16
Slovakia	8
25 Jun
Romania	6
Greece	15
25 Jun
Spain	11
Turkey	5
25 Jun
Azerbaijan	17
Lithuania	10
25 Jun
Russia	20
Netherlands	12
25 Jun
Czech Republic	13
Ireland	17

Quarter-finals
25 Jun
Switzerland	11
Slovenia	17
25 Jun
Ukraine	21
Greece	19
25 Jun
Spain	19
Azerbaijan	17
25 Jun
Russia	21
Ireland	15

Semi-finals
26 Jun
Slovenia	16
Ukraine	21
26 Jun
Spain	12
Russia	13

Final
26 Jun
Ukraine	17
Russia	22
Third place
26 Jun
Slovenia	9
Spain	19

== See also ==
- Basketball at the 2015 European Games – Men's tournament
