= Italy women's national 3x3 team =

National 3x3 basketball team

Italy
- FIBA zone: FIBA Europe
- Nickname: Azzurre

Olympic Games
- Appearances: 1

World Cup
- Appearances: 8
- Medals: (gold) Gold: 2018

FIBA Europe 3x3 Championships
- Appearances: 5

The Italy women's national 3x3 team is a national basketball team of Italy, administered by the Federazione Italiana Pallacanestro. It represents the country in international women's 3x3 (3 against 3) basketball competitions.

They won the 2018 FIBA 3x3 World Cup – Women's tournament, their first international title and first ever victory of an Italian team in a FIBA sanctioned tournament. The 159 cm Raelin D'Alie won the MVP award.

== International events ==
=== Summer Olympics ===
Year	Position	Pld	W	L
(Japan) 2020 Tokyo	6th place	8	2	6
(France) 2024 Paris	Did not qualify			
(United States) 2028 Los Angeles	Future event			
Total	1/2	8	2	6

=== World Cup ===
Year	Position	Pld	W	L
(Greece) 2012 Athenes	Not qualified			
(Russia) 2014 Moscow	Preliminary round	5	1	4
(China) 2016 Guangzhou	Preliminary round	4	3	1
(France) 2017 Nantes	Quarter-finals	5	4	1
(Philippines) 2018 Bocaue	Winner	7	6	1
(Netherlands) 2019 Amsterdam	Quarter-finals	5	3	2
(Belgium) 2022 Antwerp	Did not qualify			
(Austria) 2023 Vienna	Round of 16	5	2	3
(Mongolia) 2025 Ulaanbaatar	Preliminary round	4	1	3
(Poland) 2026 Warsaw	Preliminary round	4	0	4
2027 Singapore	To be determined			
Total	8/11	39	20	19

=== European Games ===
Year	Position	Pld	W	L
(Azerbaijan) 2015 Baku	Did not qualify			
(Belarus) 2019 Minsk	Preliminary round	3	0	3
(Poland) 2023 Kraków	Did not enter			
Total	1/3	3	0	3

=== European Championships ===
Year	Position	Pld	W	L
(Romania) 2014 Bucharest	Did not qualify			
(Romania) 2016 Bucharest	Preliminary round	2	0	2
(Netherlands) 2017 Amsterdam	Quarter-finals	3	2	1
(Romania) 2018 Bucharest	4th Place	5	2	3
(Hungary) 2019 Debrecen	Preliminary round	2	0	2
(France) 2021 Paris	Did not enter			
(Austria) 2022 Graz	Did not qualify			
(Israel) 2023 Jerusalem	Quarter-finals	3	2	1
(Austria) 2024 Vienna	Preliminary round	2	0	2
(Denmark) 2025 Copenhagen	Did not qualify			
(Belgium) 2026 Antwerp	Did not qualify			
Total	6/10	17	6	11

=== Mediterranean Games ===
Year	Position	Pld	W	L
(Spain) Tarragona 2018	Preliminary round	3	1	2
(Algeria) Oran 2022	2nd	6	4	2
Total	2/2	9	5	4

=== Women's Series ===
==== Stages ====
Year	Position	Pld	W	L
(Canada) Edmonton 2019	3rd Place	4	2	2
(Italy) Udine 2019	3rd Place	4	3	1
(Hungary) Debrecen 2019	7th Place	3	1	2
(Romania) Bucharest 2019	4th Place	5	2	3
(France) Voiron 2019	3rd Place	5	3	2
(France) La Rochelle 2019	7th Place	3	1	2
(Italy) Lignano 2019	5th Place	4	1	3
(France) Poiters 2019	5th Place	4	2	2
(Italy) Turin 2019	2nd Place	5	4	1
(France) Poiters 2022	6th Place	3	1	2
(Czech Republic) Prague 2022	9th Place	2	0	2
(Romania) Bucharest 2022	2nd Place	5	3	2
(France) Orléans 2023	8th Place	3	1	2
(France) Poiters 2023	3rd Place	4	2	2
(Switzerland) Fribourg 2023	9th Place	2	0	2
(Czech Republic) Prague 2023	12th Place	2	0	2
(Poland) Katowice 2023	7th Place	3	2	1
(Canada) Québec 2023	4th Place	5	3	2
(Azerbaijan) Baku 2023	9th Place	4	3	1
(France) Marseille 2024	5th Place	4	1	3
(Azerbaijan) Gabala 2024	Winner	6	5	1
(France) Orléans 2024	3rd Place	4	3	1
(France) Bordeaux 2024	7th Place	3	1	2
(Kosovo) Pristina 2024	4th Place	5	2	3
(Azerbaijan) Baku 2024	5th Place	3	2	1
(China) Hangzhou Finals 2024	4th Place	4	2	2
(Netherlands) Amsterdam 2025	8th Place	3	1	2
(Azerbaijan) Baku 2025	7th Place	5	3	2
(Austria) Vienna 2025	11th Place	2	0	2
(Romania) Bucharest 2025	10th Place	2	1	1
(Hungary) Debrecen 2025	11th Place	4	2	2
(France) Orleans 2026	4th Place	4	2	2
(Netherlands) Amsterdam 2026	3rd Place	4	3	1
(France) Marseille 2026	7th place	3	1	2
Total		126	63	63

==== Final ranking ====
Season	Position	Pld	W	L
2019	3rd Place	37	19	18
2021	Did not entry	0	0	0
2022	17th Place	10	4	6
2023	18th Place	23	11	12
2024	4th Place	29	16	13
2025	25th Place	16	7	9
2026	TBD	11	6	5
Total		126	63	63

== See also ==
- Italy women's national basketball team
- Italy men's national 3x3 team
