= Mérédis Houmounou =

French basketball player

Personal information
- Born: 28 November 1988 (age 37) Nancy, France
Medal record
Representing France
Basketball 3x3
World Championship
Silver medal – second place	2012 Athens	Men's
Gold medal – first place	2012 Athens	Mixed

Mérédis Houmounou (born 28 November 1988 in Nancy, France) is a French basketball player who played for French Pro A league club Cholet between 2009 and 2011.

In August 2018, he signed with SLUC Nancy Basket.
