= 2022 FIBA 3x3 Europe Cup =

European basketball tournament

Tournament information
- Location: Graz
- Dates: 9–11 September 2022
- Host: Austria

The 2022 FIBA 3x3 Europe Cup was the seventh edition of the 3x3 Europe Cup that featured separate competitions for men's and women's national teams. It was held between 9 and 11 September 2022 in Graz, Austria.

Serbia's men team won its fourth consecutive title, while France's women team won its third title.

== Medalists ==
Event	Gold	Silver	Bronze
Men's team	Serbia; Marko Branković; Dejan Majstorović; Strahinja Stojačić; Mihailo Vasić	Latvia; Agnis Čavars; Edgars Krūmiņš; Kārlis Lasmanis; Nauris Miezis	Netherlands; Jan Driessen; Julian Jaring; Arvin Slagter; Dimeo van der Horst
Women's team	France; Myriam Djekoundade; Laëtitia Guapo; Hortense Limouzin; Marie Mané	Netherlands; Loyce Bettonvil; Noortje Driessen; Julia Jorritsma; Natalie van den Adel	Poland; Dominika Fiszer; Klaudia Gertchen; Aldona Morawiec; Klaudia Sosnowska

== Men's tournament ==
=== Preliminary round ===
Pool A

Pos	Team	Pld	W	L	PF	PA	PD	PCT	Qualification	(Serbia)	(Israel)	(Slovenia)
1	Serbia	2	2	0	42	27	+15	1.000	Quarterfinals	—	21–13	21–14
2	Israel	2	1	1	35	33	+2	.500	Quarterfinals	13–21	—	22–12
3	Slovenia	2	0	2	26	43	−17	.000		14–21	12–22	—

Source: fiba basketball
Rules for classification: 1) Wins; 2) Head-to-head record; 3) Points scored; 4) Higher seed.

Pool B

Pos	Team	Pld	W	L	PF	PA	PD	PCT	Qualification	(Lithuania)	(Austria)	(Hungary)
1	Lithuania	2	2	0	40	33	+7	1.000	Quarterfinals	—	21–15	19–18
2	Austria (H)	2	1	1	36	34	+2	.500	Quarterfinals	15–21	—	21–13
3	Hungary	2	0	2	31	40	−9	.000		18–19	13–21	—

Source: fiba basketball
Rules for classification: 1) Wins; 2) Head-to-head record; 3) Points scored; 4) Higher seed.
(H) Hosts

Pool C

Pos	Team	Pld	W	L	PF	PA	PD	PCT	Qualification	(Latvia)	(Poland)	(Montenegro)
1	Latvia	2	2	0	42	30	+12	1.000	Quarterfinals	—	21–13	21–17
2	Poland	2	1	1	34	34	0	.500	Quarterfinals	13–21	—	21–13
3	Montenegro	2	0	2	30	42	−12	.000		17–21	13–21	—

Source: fiba basketball
Rules for classification: 1) Wins; 2) Head-to-head record; 3) Points scored; 4) Higher seed.

Pool D

Pos	Team	Pld	W	L	PF	PA	PD	PCT	Qualification	(Netherlands)	(Belgium)	(Azerbaijan)
1	Netherlands	2	2	0	43	23	+20	1.000	Quarterfinals	—	21–17	22–6
2	Belgium	2	1	1	31	34	−3	.500	Quarterfinals	17–21	—	14–13
3	Azerbaijan	2	0	2	19	36	−17	.000		6–22	13–14	—

Source: fiba basketball
Rules for classification: 1) Wins; 2) Head-to-head record; 3) Points scored; 4) Higher seed.

=== Knockout stage ===
All times are local.

Quarter-finals
11 Sep 2022 – 13:55
Serbia	21
Poland	18
11 Sep 2022 – 14:20
Netherlands	21
Austria	15
11 Sep 2022 – 16:05
Lithuania	18
Belgium	17
11 Sep 2022 – 16:30
Latvia	21
Israel	7

Semi-finals
11 Sep 2022 – 19:20
Serbia	21
Netherlands	10
11 Sep 2022 – 19:45
Lithuania	20
Latvia	21

Final
11 Sep 2022 – 21:45
Serbia	21
Latvia	14
Bronze medal
11 Sep 2022 – 20:55
Netherlands	21
Lithuania	10

=== Final standings ===
Pos	Team	Pld	W	L	PF
1	Serbia	5	5	0	105
2	Latvia	5	4	1	98
3	Netherlands	5	4	1	95
4	Lithuania	5	3	2	88
5	Poland	3	1	2	52
6	Austria	3	1	2	51
7	Belgium	3	1	2	48
8	Israel	3	1	2	42
9	Hungary	2	0	2	31
10	Montenegro	2	0	2	30
11	Slovenia	2	0	2	26
12	Azerbaijan	2	0	2	19

== Women's tournament ==
=== Preliminary round ===
Pool A

Pos	Team	Pld	W	L	PF	PA	PD	PCT	Qualification	(Germany)	(Estonia)	(Austria)
1	Germany	2	2	0	25	17	+8	1.000	Quarterfinals	—	11–5	14–12
2	Estonia	2	1	1	23	21	+2	.500	Quarterfinals	5–11	—	18–10
3	Austria (H)	2	0	2	22	32	−10	.000		12–14	10–18	—

Source: fiba basketball
Rules for classification: 1) Wins; 2) Head-to-head record; 3) Points scored; 4) Higher seed.
(H) Hosts

Pool B

Pos	Team	Pld	W	L	PF	PA	PD	PCT	Qualification	(France)	(Switzerland)	(Romania)
1	France	2	2	0	39	24	+15	1.000	Quarterfinals	—	20–15	19–9
2	Switzerland	2	1	1	33	32	+1	.500	Quarterfinals	15–20	—	18–12
3	Romania	2	0	2	21	37	−16	.000		9–19	12–18	—

Source: fiba basketball
Rules for classification: 1) Wins; 2) Head-to-head record; 3) Points scored; 4) Higher seed.

Pool C

Pos	Team	Pld	W	L	PF	PA	PD	PCT	Qualification	(Spain)	(Netherlands)	(Portugal)
1	Spain	2	2	0	39	31	+8	1.000	Quarterfinals	—	18–16	21–15
2	Netherlands	2	1	1	37	32	+5	.500	Quarterfinals	16–18	—	21–14
3	Portugal	2	0	2	29	42	−13	.000		15–21	14–21	—

Source: fiba basketball
Rules for classification: 1) Wins; 2) Head-to-head record; 3) Points scored; 4) Higher seed.

Pool D

Pos	Team	Pld	W	L	PF	PA	PD	PCT	Qualification	(Poland)	(Lithuania)	(Cyprus)
1	Poland	2	2	0	43	24	+19	1.000	Quarterfinals	—	21–16	22–8
2	Lithuania	2	1	1	38	36	+2	.500	Quarterfinals	16–21	—	22–15
3	Cyprus	2	0	2	23	44	−21	.000		8–22	15–22	—

Source: fiba basketball
Rules for classification: 1) Wins; 2) Head-to-head record; 3) Points scored; 4) Higher seed.

=== Knockout stage ===
All times are local.

Quarter-finals
11 Sep 2022 – 13:05
Germany	12
Netherlands	17
11 Sep 2022 – 13:30
Poland	17
Switzerland	15
11 Sep 2022 – 15:15
France	18
Lithuania	16
11 Sep 2022 – 15:40
Spain	21
Estonia	12

Semi-finals
11 Sep 2022 – 18:05
Netherlands	20
Poland	15
11 Sep 2022 – 18:30
France	21
Spain	11

Final
11 Sep 2022 – 21:20
Netherlands	14
France	21
Bronze medal
11 Sep 2022 – 20:30
Poland	16
Spain	13

=== Final standings ===
Pos	Team	Pld	W	L	PF
1	France	5	5	0	99
2	Netherlands	5	3	2	88
3	Poland	5	4	1	91
4	Spain	5	3	2	84
5	Germany	3	2	1	37
6	Lithuania	3	1	2	54
7	Switzerland	3	1	2	48
8	Estonia	3	1	2	35
9	Portugal	2	0	2	29
10	Cyprus	2	0	2	23
11	Austria	2	0	2	22
12	Romania	2	0	2	21
