= Aleksandar Ratkov =

Serbian 3x3 basketball player

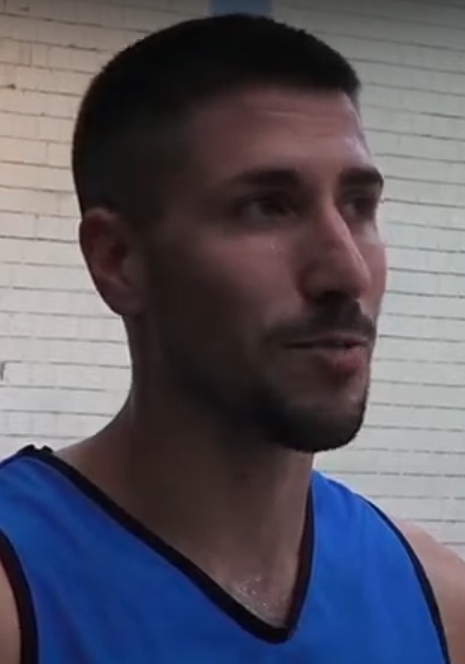
- Ratkov in 2018

No. 5 – Liman 3x3
- Position: Forward
- League: FIBA 3x3 World Tour

Personal information
- Born: 11 March 1992 (age 34) Belgrade, SR Serbia, SFR Yugoslavia
- Listed height: 1.94 m (6 ft 4 in)
- Listed weight: 94 kg (207 lb)

Career information
- NBA draft: 2014: undrafted
- Playing career: 2010–present

Career history
- 2010–2012: Vojvodina
- 2015–present: Liman 3x3
Medals
Men's 3x3 basketball
Representing Serbia
Olympic Games
| Bronze medal – third place | 2020 Tokyo | Team |
Europe Cup
| Gold medal – first place | 2021 France |

Aleksandar Ratkov (Serbian Cyrillic: Александар Ратков; born 11 March 1992) is a Serbian 3x3 basketball player for Liman 3x3 of the FIBA 3x3 World Tour. Also, he represents the Serbian national team internationally.

== 3x3 career ==
Ratkov has been a member of Novi Sad-based Liman 3x3 team since it formation in 2015. He co-founded the team with Stefan Stojačić at the University of Novi Sad Faculty of Technical Sciences. In 2017, the team has its first professional season.

== National 3x3 team career ==
Ratkov represents Serbian 3x3 national team internationally. He made his debut at the 2020 Summer Olympics.
