= Lithuania national basketball team =

Lithuania national basketball team may refer to:

- Lithuania men's national basketball team
- Lithuania women's national basketball team
- Lithuania men's national under-20 basketball team
- Lithuania men's national under-18 and under-19 basketball team
- Lithuania men's national under-16 and under-17 basketball team
- Lithuania women's national under-20 basketball team
- Lithuania women's national under-19 basketball team
- Lithuania women's national under-17 basketball team
