= 2017 FIBA 3x3 World Cup – Men's tournament =

2017 FIBA 3x3 World Cup
Tournament details
- Host country: France
- City: Nantes
- Dates: June 17–21
- Teams: 20

Final positions
- Champions: Serbia (3rd title)
- Runners-up: Netherlands
- Third place: France
- Fourth place: Slovenia

Tournament statistics
- MVP: (Serbia) Dejan Majstorović

The 2017 FIBA 3x3 World Cup was held in Nantes, France, and was contested by 20 teams.

== Participating teams ==
All five FIBA zones were represented. The top 20 teams, including the hosts, based on the FIBA National Federation ranking qualified for the tournament.

FIBA Africa Team Egypt (16)	FIBA Americas Team United States (4) El Salvador (15) Puerto Rico (17)	FIBA Asia and FIBA Oceania Team New Zealand (12) Indonesia (13) Qatar (14) Philippines (18) Sri Lanka (19) South Korea (20)	FIBA Europe Team Serbia (1) Slovenia (2) Poland (3) Netherlands (5) Ukraine (6) Romania (7) Russia (8) Andorra (9) France (10) {hosts} Estonia (11)

== Players ==
Seed	Team	Players
9	Andorra	Oriol Fernández, Esteve Malet, Rafael Casals, Jordi Plasencia
16	Egypt	Ahmed Elsabbagh, Ramy Ibrahim, Mido Mohamed, Haitham Kamal
15	El Salvador	Roberto Martinez Ramirez, Luis Escoto Bran, Carlos Arias Serrano, Julio Mancia Arias
11	Estonia	Erik Luts, Jaagup Toome, Mario Polusk, Sander Viilup
10	France	Charles Bronchard, Dominique Gentil, Angelo Tsagarakis, Charly Pontens
13	Indonesia	Rivaldo Pangesthio, Fandi Ramadhani, Kevin Moses Poetiray, Vinton Surawi
5	Netherlands	Jesper Jobse, Joey Schelvis, Sjoerd Van Vilsteren, Bas Rozendaal
12	New Zealand	Karl Noyer, Marco Alexander, Aaron Bailey-Nowell, Angus Riley
18	Philippines	Kobe Paras, Joseph Ronald Quiñahan, Kiefer Ravena, Jeron Teng
3	Poland	Szymon Rduch, Przemysław Rduch, Arkadiusz Kobus, Dawid Brek
17	Puerto Rico	Luis Hernandez, Jonathan Garcia, Wil Martinez, Gilberto Clavell
14	Qatar	Abdulrahman Saad, Erfan Ali, Tanguy Ngombo, Fadi Abilmona
7	Romania	Bogdan Cezar Sandu, Mihai Vacarescu, Baragau Cezar, Marius Ciotlaus
8	Russia	Leo Lagutin, Ilya Alexandrov, Dmitrii Kriukov, Vasily Fedosov
1	Serbia	Dušan Bulut, Marko Savić, Marko Ždero, Dejan Majstorović
2	Slovenia	Anže Srebovt, Gašper Ovnik, Simon Finžgar, Adin Kavgić
20	South Korea	Choi Go-bong, Namkoong Jun-soo, Seung Jun-lee, Shin Yun-ha
19	Sri Lanka	Thimothi Nithushan, Roshan Sooriyaarachchi, Sudesh Paiva, Isuru Perera
6	Ukraine	Maksym Zakurdaiev, Stanislav Tymofeyenko, Sasha Kobets, Dmytro Lypovtsev
4	United States	Craig Moore, Dan Mavraides, Damon Huffman, Zahir Carrington

== Preliminary round ==
=== Pool A ===
Pos	Team	Pld	W	L	PF	PA	PD	Qualification	(Serbia)	(Russia)	(Puerto Rico)	(Andorra)	(Egypt)
1	Serbia	4	4	0	80	59	+21	Knockout stage	—	20–17	21–14	22–13	17–15
2	Russia	4	3	1	73	66	+7	Knockout stage	17–20	—	19–17	22–15	15–14
3	Puerto Rico	4	2	2	73	71	+2		14–21	17–19	—	21–12	21–19
4	Andorra	4	1	3	55	79	−24		13–22	15–22	12–21	—	15–14
5	Egypt	4	0	4	62	68	−6		15–17	14–15	19–21	14–15	—

Rules for classification: 1) Wins; 2) Head-to-Head record; 3) Points scored; 4) Higher seed.

=== Pool B ===
Pos	Team	Pld	W	L	PF	PA	PD	Qualification	(Slovenia)	(France)	(Philippines)	(Romania)	(El Salvador)
1	Slovenia	4	4	0	82	59	+23	Knockout stage	—	19–17	21–14	21–12	21–16
2	France (H)	4	3	1	81	47	+34	Knockout stage	17–19	—	22–11	21–12	21–5
3	Philippines	4	2	2	67	72	−5		14–21	11–22	—	21–15	21–14
4	Romania	4	1	3	61	76	−15		12–21	12–21	15–21	—	22–13
5	El Salvador	4	0	4	48	85	−37		16–21	5–21	14–21	13–22	—

Rules for classification: 1) Wins; 2) Head-to-Head record; 3) Points scored; 4) Higher seed.
(H) Hosts

=== Pool C ===
Pos	Team	Pld	W	L	PF	PA	PD	Qualification	(Ukraine)	(Qatar)	(Poland)	(Estonia)	(Sri Lanka)
1	Ukraine	4	4	0	86	55	+31	Knockout stage	—	21–20	21–15	22–11	22–9
2	Qatar	4	3	1	79	51	+28	Knockout stage	20–21	—	19–17	20–9	20–4
3	Poland	4	2	2	72	63	+9		15–21	17–19	—	18–13	22–10
4	Estonia	4	1	3	54	62	−8		11–22	9–20	13–18	—	21–2
5	Sri Lanka	4	0	4	25	85	−60		9–22	4–20	10–22	2–21	—

Rules for classification: 1) Wins; 2) Head-to-Head record; 3) Points scored; 4) Higher seed.

=== Pool D ===
Pos	Team	Pld	W	L	PF	PA	PD	Qualification	(Netherlands)	(United States)	(New Zealand)	(Indonesia)	(South Korea)
1	Netherlands	4	4	0	82	42	+40	Knockout stage	—	19–12	20–13	21–11	22–6
2	United States	4	3	1	75	37	+38	Knockout stage	12–19	—	21–6	21–8	21–4
3	New Zealand	4	1	3	46	69	−23		13–20	6–21	—	12–15	15–13
4	Indonesia	4	1	3	41	66	−25		11–21	8–21	15–12	—	7–12
5	South Korea	4	1	3	35	65	−30		6–22	4–21	13–15	12–7	—

Rules for classification: 1) Wins; 2) Head-to-Head record; 3) Points scored; 4) Higher seed.

== Knockout stage ==
Quarter-finals
Serbia	17
United States	14
Ukraine	12
France	20
Slovenia	18
Qatar	15
Netherlands	15
Russia	13

Semi-finals
Serbia	22
France	11
Slovenia	12
Netherlands	13

Final
Serbia	21
Netherlands	18
Bronze Final
Slovenia	17
France	18

== Final standings ==
#	Team	Pld	W	L	PF	PA	PD
1st place, gold medalist(s)	Serbia	7	7	0	140	102	+38
2nd place, silver medalist(s)	Netherlands	7	6	1	128	88	+40
3rd place, bronze medalist(s)	France	7	5	2	130	98	+32
4th	Slovenia	7	5	2	129	105	+24
Eliminated in the quarterfinals
5th	Ukraine	5	4	1	98	75	+23
6th	United States	5	3	2	89	54	+35
7th	Qatar	5	3	2	94	69	+25
8th	Russia	5	3	2	86	81	+5
Eliminated in the preliminary round
9th	Poland	4	2	2	72	63	+9
10th	Puerto Rico	4	2	2	73	71	+2
11th	Philippines	4	2	2	67	72	–5
12th	Estonia	4	1	3	54	62	–8
13th	Romania	4	1	3	61	76	–15
14th	New Zealand	4	1	3	46	69	–23
15th	Andorra	4	1	3	55	79	–24
16th	Indonesia	4	1	3	41	66	–25
17th	South Korea	4	1	3	35	65	–30
18th	Egypt	4	0	4	62	68	–6
19th	El Salvador	4	0	4	48	85	–37
20th	Sri Lanka	4	0	4	25	85	–60

== Awards ==
2017 FIBA 3x3 World Champions – Men's

Serbia
3rd title

=== Individual awards ===
Most Valuable Player

- (Serbia) Dejan Majstorović (SRB)

Team of the Tournament

- (Serbia) Dušan Bulut (SRB)
- (Netherlands) Jesper Jobse (NED)
- (Serbia) Dejan Majstorović (SRB)

== Individual contests ==
=== Dunk contest ===
Overall format

Each player had 75 seconds and 3 attempts per round to complete a dunk with the first successful dunk being considered as the valid one. A jury of five members rated each dunk by assigning 5 to 10 points to it (by each member) or 0 points if the dunk was unsuccessful.

==== Qualification ====
Format

The qualification round took place on June 19. Each player competed in two rounds and four players with the highest score then advanced to the knockout stage. In a case of ties, the tied players would perform again and if they were still tied, the jury decided which player advanced.

Country	Dunker	1st round	2nd round	Total
United States	Chris Staples	30	27	57
Poland	Rafal Lipinski	27	29	56
Ukraine	Vadym Poddubchenko	28	28	56
United States	Jordan Southerland	27	27	54
Philippines	Kobe Paras	27	23	50
Ukraine	Dmytro Kryvenko	21	23	44

==== Knockout stage ====
The knockout stage consisting of a semi-final and a final took place on June 21.

Semi-final

Top two players advanced to the final round.

Country	Dunker	1st round	2nd round	Total
United States	Chris Staples	28	28	56
Poland	Rafal Lipinski	25	27	52
Ukraine	Vadym Poddubchenko	24	28	52
United States	Jordan Southerland	26	21	47

Final

The time limit was eliminated for the final and the two players competed over three rounds instead of two.

Country	Dunker	1st round	2nd round	3rd round	Total
Poland	Rafal Lipinski	30	29	30	89
United States	Chris Staples	30	28	30	88

Results

	Team	Player
1st place, gold medalist(s)	Poland	Rafal Lipinski
2nd place, silver medalist(s)	United States	Chris Staples
3rd place, bronze medalist(s)	Ukraine	Vadym Poddubchenko
