= Slovenia men's national 3x3 team =

National 3x3 basketball team

Slovenia
- FIBA ranking: 15
- Joined FIBA: 1992
- FIBA zone: FIBA Europe
- National federation: SBF

World Cup
- Appearances: 8
- Medals: (2016, 2018)

Europe Cup
- Appearances: 4
- Medals: 2016; 2014, 2017; 2018
Home	Away
Medal record
Representing Slovenia
World Cup
Bronze medal – third place	2016 China	Team
Bronze medal – third place	2018 Philippines	Team
European Championships
Gold medal – first place	2016 Romania
Silver medal – second place	2014 Romania
Silver medal – second place	2017 Netherlands
Bronze medal – third place	2018 Romania

The Slovenia men's national 3x3 team is the 3x3 basketball team representing Slovenia in international men's competitions, organized and run by the Slovenian Basketball Federation.

== Senior Competitions ==
=== World Cup ===
Year	Pos	Pld	W	L
(Russia) 2012	Last 16	6	4	2
(Greece) 2014	Last 16	6	4	2
(China) 2016	3rd	7	6	1
(France) 2017	4th	7	5	2
(Philippines) 2018	3rd	7	5	2
(Netherlands) 2019	7th	5	3	2
(Belgium) 2022	14th	4	1	3
(Austria) 2023	20th	4	0	4
(Mongolia) 2025	did not qualify			
(Poland) 2026	did not qualify			
(Singapore) 2027	To be determined			
Total	9/11	46	28	18

=== Europe Cup ===
Year	Final tournament			
Year	Pos	Pld	W	L
(Romania) 2014	2nd	6	5	1
(Romania) 2016	1st	5	5	0
(Netherlands) 2017	2nd	5	4	1
(Romania) 2018	3rd	5	4	1
(Hungary) 2019	did not qualify			
(France) 2021	10th	2	0	2
(Austria) 2022	11th	2	0	2
(Israel) 2023	did not qualify			
(Austria) 2024	did not qualify			
(Denmark) 2025	did not qualify			
(Belgium) 2026	did not qualify			
