= 2026 FIBA 3x3 Champions Cup =

Tournament details
- Host country: Thailand
- City: Bangkok
- Dates: 13–15 March
- Teams: 16
- Venue: 1

The 2026 FIBA 3x3 Champions Cup was the second edition of this FIBA 3x3 Champions Cup. The event was held in Bangkok, Thailand from 13 to 15 March 2026.

== Men's tournament ==
Men's tournament
Tournament details
- Teams: 8

Final positions
- Champions: United States (1st title)
- Runners-up: Spain
- Third place: Netherlands
- Fourth place: Serbia

Tournament statistics
- MVP: (United States) Caden Pierce

=== Qualified teams ===
Competition	Dates	Host	Vacancies	Qualified
Host nation			1	Thailand
2025 World Cup	23–29 June 2025	(Mongolia) Ulaanbaatar	1	Spain
Defending champion	14–16 March 2025	(Thailand) Bangkok	1	Serbia
2024 FIBA 3x3 Asia Cup	27–31 March 2024	Singapore	1	Australia
2024 FIBA 3x3 Europe Cup	22–25 August 2024	(Austria) Vienna	1	Lithuania
2024 FIBA 3x3 Africa Cup	29 November – 1 December 2024	(Madagascar) Antananarivo	1	Madagascar
2024 FIBA 3x3 AmeriCup	13–15 December 2024	(Puerto Rico) San Juan	1	United States
FIBA ranking	13 February 2026		1	Netherlands

=== Preliminary round ===
The pools were announced on 13 February 2026.

==== Pool A ====
Pos	Team	Pld	W	L	PF	PA	PR	Qualification	SRB	ESP	LTU	THA
1	Serbia	3	3	0	62	43	1.442	Semifinals			20–18	21–8
2	Spain	3	1	2	52	42	1.238	Semifinals	17–21			
3	Lithuania	3	1	2	51	55	0.927			18–14		15–21
4	Thailand (H)	3	1	2	32	57	0.561			3–21		

Source: FIBA
Rules for classification: 1) Wins; 2) Head-to-head record; 3) Points scored.
(H) Hosts

==== Pool B ====
Pos	Team	Pld	W	L	PF	PA	PR	Qualification	NED	USA	AUS	MAD
1	Netherlands	3	3	0	60	46	1.304	Semifinals			15–13	19–16
2	United States	3	2	1	57	48	1.188	Semifinals	15–20			22–11
3	Australia	3	1	2	53	58	0.914			17–10		
4	Madagascar	3	0	3	44	62	0.710				17–21	

Source: FIBA
Rules for classification: 1) Wins; 2) Head-to-head record; 3) Points scored.

=== Knockout stage ===
Semi-finals
15 March
Serbia	14
United States	15
15 March
Netherlands	15
Spain	20

Final
15 March
United States	19
Spain	14
Third place
15 March
Netherlands	20
Serbia	17

=== Final ranking ===
Rank	Team	Record
1st place, gold medalist(s)	United States	4–1
2nd place, silver medalist(s)	Spain	2-3
3rd place, bronze medalist(s)	Netherlands	4–1
4	Serbia	3–2
5	Australia	1–2
6	Lithuania	1–2
7	Thailand	1–2
8	Madagascar	0–3

== Women's tournament ==
Women's tournament
Tournament details
- Teams: 8

Final positions
- Champions: Netherlands (1st title)
- Runners-up: Azerbaijan
- Third place: United States
- Fourth place: Canada

Tournament statistics
- MVP: (Netherlands) Noortje Driessen

=== Qualified teams ===
Competition	Dates	Host	Vacancies	Qualified
Host nation			1	Thailand
2025 World Cup	23–29 June 2025	(Mongolia) Ulaanbaatar	1	Netherlands
Defending champion	14–16 March 2025	(Thailand) Bangkok	1	Canada
2024 FIBA 3x3 Asia Cup	27–31 March 2024	Singapore	1	Australia
2024 FIBA 3x3 Europe Cup	22–25 August 2024	(Austria) Vienna	1	Azerbaijan
2024 FIBA 3x3 Africa Cup	29 November – 1 December 2024	(Madagascar) Antananarivo	1	Madagascar
2024 FIBA 3x3 AmeriCup	13–15 December 2024	(Puerto Rico) San Juan	1	United States
FIBA ranking	13 February 2026		1	Spain

=== Preliminary round ===
The pools were announced on 13 February 2026.

==== Pool A ====
Pos	Team	Pld	W	L	PF	PA	PR	Qualification	USA	NED	AUS	MAD
1	United States	3	3	0	60	38	1.579	Semifinals			18–15	21–5
2	Netherlands	3	2	1	55	38	1.447	Semifinals	18–21			21–6
3	Australia	3	1	2	45	39	1.154			11–16		
4	Madagascar	3	0	3	16	61	0.262				5–19	

Source: FIBA
Rules for classification: 1) Wins; 2) Head-to-head record; 3) Points scored.

==== Pool B ====
Pos	Team	Pld	W	L	PF	PA	PR	Qualification	CAN	AZE	ESP	THA
1	Canada	3	3	0	57	37	1.541	Semifinals		16–10		20–13
2	Azerbaijan	3	2	1	47	35	1.343	Semifinals			16–11	
3	Spain	3	1	2	46	44	1.045		14–21			21–7
4	Thailand (H)	3	0	3	28	62	0.452			8–21		

Source: FIBA
Rules for classification: 1) Wins; 2) Head-to-head record; 3) Points scored.
(H) Hosts

=== Knockout stage ===
Semi-finals
15 March
United States	20
Azerbaijan	22
15 March
Canada	12
Netherlands	21

Final
15 March
Azerbaijan	12
Netherlands	21
Third place
15 March
United States	20
Canada	10

=== Final ranking ===
Rank	Team	Record
1st place, gold medalist(s)	Netherlands	4–1
2nd place, silver medalist(s)	Azerbaijan	3–2
3rd place, bronze medalist(s)	United States	4–1
4	Canada	3–2
5	Spain	1–2
6	Australia	1–2
7	Thailand	0–3
8	Madagascar	0–3
