= Marko Ždero =

Serbian basketball player

Personal information
- Born: 14 March 1985 (age 41) Karađorđevo, SR Serbia, SFR Yugoslavia
- Listed height: 1.90 m (6 ft 3 in)
- Listed weight: 95 kg (209 lb)

Career information
- Playing career: 2012–2019
- Position: Point guard
- Number: 3

Career history
- 2012–2019: Novi Sad (3x3)

Career highlights
- 3× FIBA 3x3 World Tour winner (2014, 2015, 2018)
Medals
Men's 3x3 basketball
Representing Serbia
World Championships
Gold medal – first place	2012 Greece	Team
Gold medal – first place	2016 China	Team
Gold medal – first place	2017 France	Team
Silver medal – second place	2014 Russia	Team
European Championships
Gold medal – first place	2018 Romania	Team
Silver medal – second place	2016 Romania	Team
European Games
Bronze medal – third place	2015 Baku	Team

Marko Ždero (Serbian Cyrillic: Марко Ждеро; born 14 March 1985) is a Serbian former professional basketball player.

== 3x3 basketball career ==
Ždero started to play at the FIBA 3x3 World Tour in August 2012 with his childhood friends and later teammates Dušan Domović Bulut and Marko Savić. He plays for United Arab Emirates based team Novi Sad Al-Wahda.

=== Serbia national team ===
Ždero represents Serbia in the 3x3 basketball. He won three gold medals at the FIBA 3x3 World Championships (2012 in Greece, 2016 in China and 2017 in France) and silver medal at the 2014 tournament in Russia.

== Basketball career ==
Ždero plays for the Srbobran based team Akademik in the North Division of the Serbian First League (3rd tier).

== Awards and accomplishments ==
- FIBA 3x3 World Tour winner: 3 (2014, 2015, 2018)
