= Viktoriia Paziuk =

Ukrainian basketball player

Personal information
- Born: February 11, 1985 (age 41) Ivano-Frankivsk Oblast, Ukraine
- Listed height: 188 cm (6 ft 2 in)
- Listed weight: 70 kg (154 lb)
- Position: Forward

Viktoriia Paziuk (born 11 February 1985 in Ivano-Frankivsk Oblast, Ukraine) is a Ukrainian basketball player for the Ukrainian national team. During her professional career, she has played for various Ukrainian teams. In the 2022/23 season, she was in the squad of the Team of Poltava Oblast.

Paziuk played only on few occasions for the national team. She became more prominent as a 3x3 basketball player. Paziuk competed for the national 3x3 team at the inaugural European Championships in 2014. Paziuk is a 2015 European Games silver medallist.
