= Stefan Stojačić =

Serbian professional basketball player (born 1989)

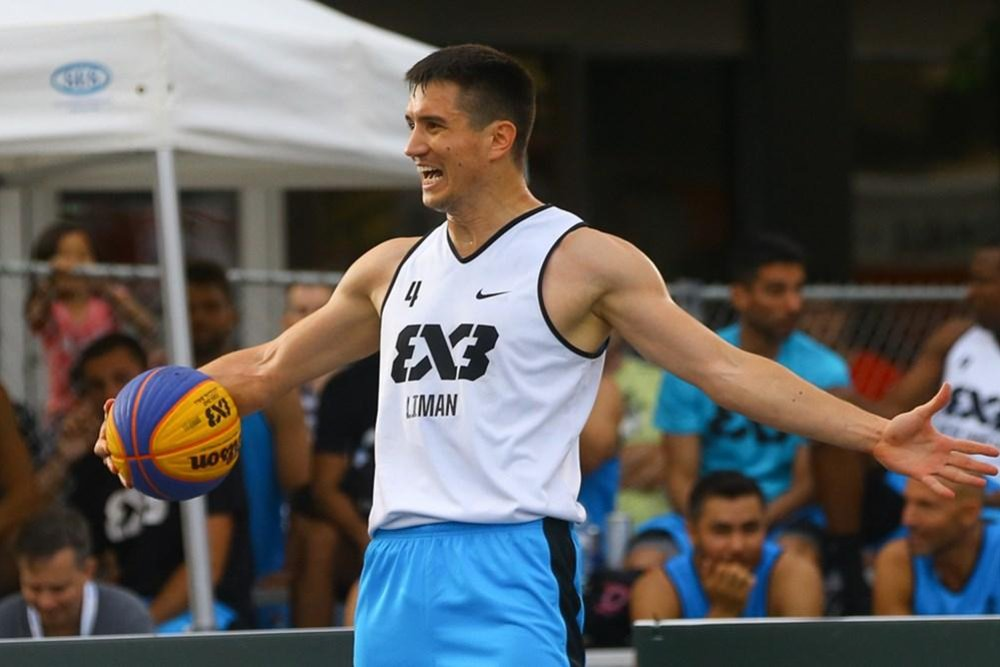
- Stefan Stojačić in 2017

Personal information
- Born: February 20, 1989 (age 37) Novi Sad, SR Serbia, SFR Yugoslavia
- Listed height: 1.94 m (6 ft 4 in)

Career information
- NBA draft: 2011: undrafted
- Playing career: 2007–2013, 2016–present
- Position: Shooting guard

Career history
- 2007–2010: Mega Vizura
- 2010: Crvena zvezda
- 2010–2011: Radnički Kragujevac
- 2011–2013: Vojvodina Srbijagas
- 2016–2018: Vojvodina
Medals
Representing Serbia
Men's 3x3 basketball
World Cup
Gold medal – first place	2018 Philippines	Team
Men's basketball
U20 European Championship
Gold medal – first place	2008 Latvia	U-20 Team
U19 World Championship
Gold medal – first place	2007 Serbia	U-19 Team
U18 European Championship
Gold medal – first place	2007 Spain	U-18 Team

Stefan Stojačić (Cyrillic: Стефан Стојачић; born February 20, 1989) is a Serbian professional basketball player.

His younger brother, Strahinja Stojačić, is also a basketball player. They played together in the 2010–11 season with Radnički Kragujevac.

== Professional career ==
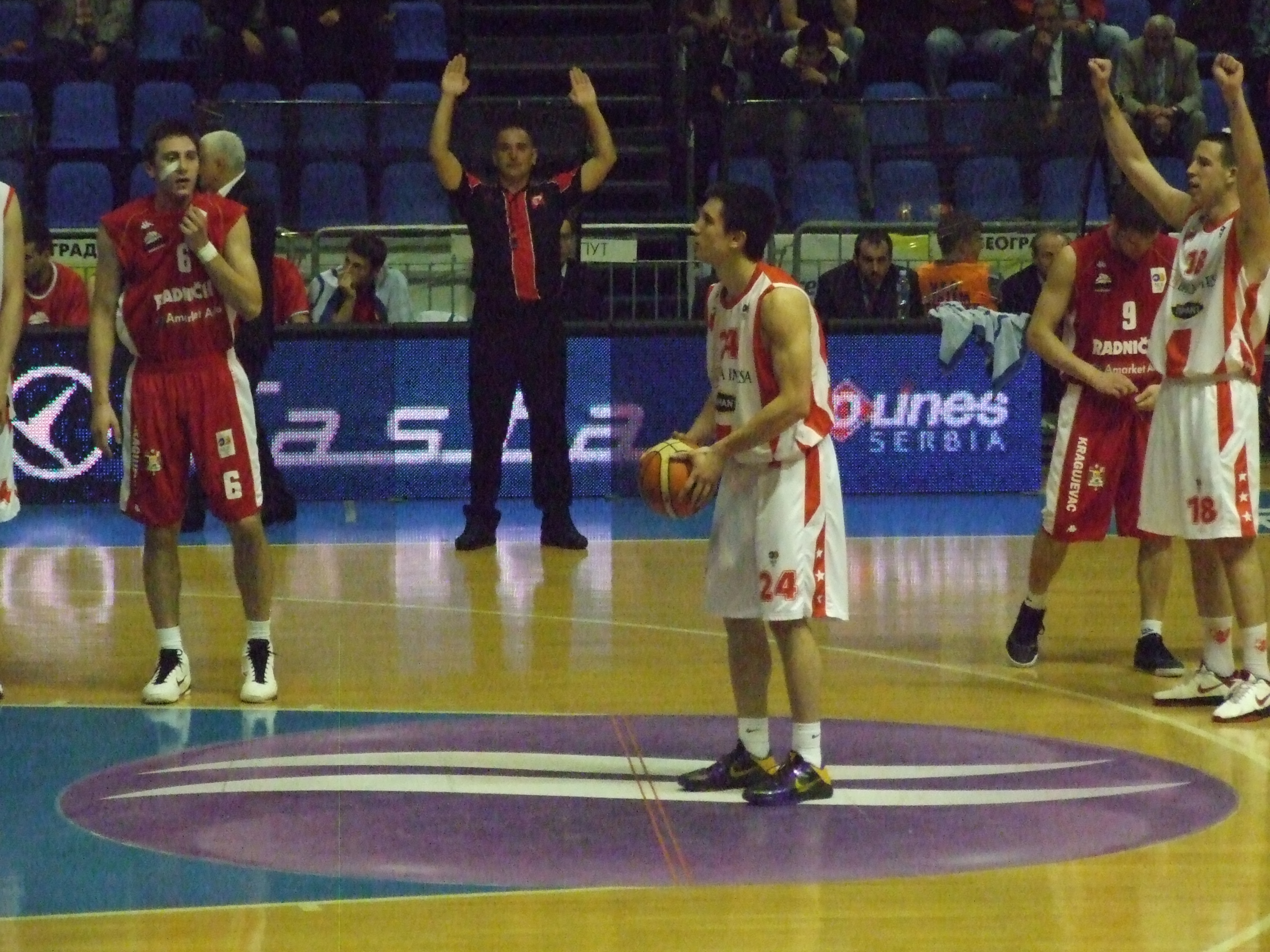
Stojačić taking a free throw with KK Crvena zvezda in May 2010.

After playing for youth teams of Partizan, Stojačić moved to Mega Aqua Monta and signed his first professional contract in 2007.

== Serbian national team ==
Stojačić won three gold medals with the Serbian junior national teams. He also played at the Stanković Cup in 2008.
