= Evaldas Džiaugys =

Lithuanian basketball player (born 1996)

Personal information
- Born: 26 September 1996 (age 30) Raseiniai, Lithuania
- Listed height: 1.96 m (6 ft 5 in)
Medals
Men's 3x3 basketball
Representing Lithuania
Olympic Games
| Bronze medal – third place | 2024 Paris | Team |
Europe Cup
| Gold medal – first place | 2025 Copenhagen | Team |
| Silver medal – second place | 2023 Jerusalem |

Evaldas Džiaugys (born 26 September 1996) is a Lithuanian basketball player. He represented Lithuania at the 2024 Summer Olympics in 3x3 event.
