= Russia women's national 3x3 team =

Russian basketball team

Russia
- FIBA zone: FIBA Europe

Olympic Games
- Appearances: 1
- Medals: Silver: 2020

FIBA 3x3 World Championships
- Appearances: 5
- Medals: (gold) Gold: 2017 (silver) Silver: 2014, 2018

FIBA Europe 3x3 Championships
- Appearances: 4
- Medals: Gold: 2014, 2017 Bronze: 2016

The Russia women's national 3x3 team is a national basketball team of Russia, administered by the Russian Basketball Federation.

It represents the country in international 3x3 (3 against 3) women's basketball competitions.

== Senior Competitions ==
=== Summer Olympics ===
| Year | Position | Pld | W | L |
|---|---|---|---|---|
| (Japan) 2020 Tokyo | 2nd | 9 | 6 | 3 |
| Total | 1/1 | 9 | 6 | 3 |

=== Performance at World Championships ===
| Year | Pos | Pld | W | L |
|---|---|---|---|---|
| (Greece) 2012 | 9th | 6 | 5 | 1 |
| (Russia) 2014 | 2nd | 9 | 8 | 1 |
| (China) 2016 | did not participate | | | |
| (France) 2017 | 1st | 7 | 7 | 0 |
| (Philippines) 2018 | 2nd | 7 | 5 | 2 |
| (Netherlands) 2019 | 6th | 5 | 4 | 1 |
| (Belgium) 2022 | disqualified | | | |
| (Austria) 2023 | disqualified | | | |
| (Mongolia) 2025 | disqualified | | | |
| (Poland) 2026 | disqualified | | | |
| (Singapore) 2027 | to be determined | | | |

=== Performance at Europe Championships ===
| Year | Final tournament | | | | Qualifier | | |
| Year | Pos | Pld | W | L | Pld | W | L |
|---|---|---|---|---|---|---|---|
| (Romania) 2014 | 1st | 6 | 6 | 0 | 3 | 3 | 0 |
| (Romania) 2016 | 3rd | 5 | 4 | 1 | 3 | 2 | 1 |
| (Netherlands) 2017 | 1st | 5 | 5 | 0 | — | | |
| (Romania) 2018 | did not qualify | | | | 3 | 1 | 2 |
| (Hungary) 2019 | Quarterfinalist | 3 | 2 | 1 | — | | |

== See also ==
- Russia women's national basketball team
