= Hanna Rulyova =

Ukrainian basketball player

No. 15 – Turan
- Position: Forward
- League: Kazakhstan Women's League

Personal information
- Born: June 8, 1986 (age 40) Zaporizhzhia, Ukraine
- Listed height: 183 cm (6 ft 0 in)
- Listed weight: 88 kg (194 lb)

Hanna Rulyova (née Zarytska, born 8 June 1986 in Zaporizhzhia, Ukraine) is a Ukrainian basketball player for Turan (Kazakhstan) and the Ukrainian national team.

She participated in the EuroBasket Women 2009 and EuroBasket Women 2013. She also played in the qualifications for the 2017 tournament.

Zarytska became more prominent as a 3x3 basketball player. She is a 2015 European Games silver medallist. She won silver at the 2016 World Cup and was named to the Team of the tournament. After changing her surname to Rulyova, she competed at the 2019 European Games but the tournament was not successful for the Ukrainian team. Rulyova also competed to qualify the Ukrainian team for the 2020 Summer Olympics but the team did not manage to win a spot at the 2021 Olympic Qualifying Tournament.
