= Netherlands women's national 3x3 team =

National 3x3 basketball team

Netherlands
- FIBA ranking: 10
- FIBA zone: FIBA Europe
- National federation: NBB

World Cup
- Appearances: 11
- Medals: Gold : (2025); Bronze: (2026)

Europe Cup
- Appearances: 10
- Medals: Gold : (2023, 2025, 2026)
Home	Away
Medal record
Representing Netherlands
Women's 3x3 basketball
World Cup
Gold medal – first place	2025 Ulaanbaatar	Team
Bronze medal – third place	2026 Warsaw	Team
Europe Cup
Gold medal – first place	2023 Jerusalem
Gold medal – first place	2025 Copenhagen	Team
Gold medal – first place	2026 Antwerp	Team
Silver medal – second place	2022 Graz
Silver medal – second place	2018 Bucharest
Bronze medal – third place	2024 Vienna	Team
Bronze medal – third place	2017 Amsterdam	Team

The Netherlands women's national 3x3 basketball team is the basketball side that represents the Netherlands in international 3x3 basketball (3 against 3) competitions. It is organized and run by Basketball Nederland.

== Competitions ==
=== World Cup ===
Year	Position	Pld	W	L	Players
(Greece) 2012 Athens	21st	5	0	5	Heinen, Gosschalk, Mourik, Van Daalen
(Russia) 2014 Moscow	12th	6	3	3	Heinen, Gosschalk, Mourik, Van der Lee
(China) 2016 Guangzhou	7th	5	3	2	Klerx, Kuijt, Van Kleef, Van den Adel
(France) 2017 Nantes	4th	7	5	2	J. Bettonvil, L. Bettonvil, Klerx, Kuijt
(Philippines) 2018 Bocaue	9th	4	3	1	Beld, J. Bettonvil, Klerx, Kuijt
(Netherlands) 2019 Amsterdam	12th	4	2	2	J. Bettonvil, L. Bettonvil, Kuijt, Van den Adel
(Belgium) 2022 Antwerp	10th	5	2	3	L. Bettonvil, Driessen, Guijt, Van den Adel
(Austria) 2023 Vienna	16th	4	1	3	L. Bettonvil, Fleuren, Jorritsma, Van den Adel
(Mongolia) 2025 Ulaanbaatar	1st	8	6	2	Boonstra, Driessen, Kuijt, Schipholt
(Poland) 2026 Warsaw	3rd	7	6	1	Driessen, Kuijt, Slagter, Schipholt
2027 Singapore	To be determined				
Total	10/11	55	31	24	

=== Europe Cup ===
Year	Position	Pld	W	L	Players
(Romania) 2014 Bucharest	4th	6	3	3	Beld, Heinen, Gosschalk, Van den Adel
(Romania) 2016 Bucharest	Did not qualify				
(Netherlands) 2017 Amsterdam	3rd	5	3	2	Beld, L. Bettonvil, Klerx, Kuijt
(Romania) 2018 Bucharest	2nd	5	3	2	J. Bettonvil, L. Bettonvil, Guijt, Van den Adel
(Hungary) 2019 Debrecen	4th	5	2	3	J. Bettonvil, L. Bettonvil, Kuijt, Van den Adel
(France) 2021 Paris	9th	2	0	2	Boonstra, Driessen, Fokke, Van den Adel
(Austria) 2022 Graz	2nd	5	4	1	L. Bettonvil, Driessen, Jorritsma, Van den Adel
(Israel) 2023 Jerusalem	1st	5	5	0	L. Bettonvil, Boonstra, Driessen, Fleuren
(Austria) 2024 Vienna	3rd	5	4	1	L. Bettonvil, Boonstra, Driessen, Fleuren
(Denmark) 2025 Copenhagen	1st	4	4	0	Boonstra, Driessen, Slagter, Van Kruistum
(Belgium) 2026 Antwerp	1st	5	5	0	Boonstra, Driessen, Kuijt, Schipholt
Total	10/11	45	31	14	

=== Champions Cup ===
Year	Position	Pld	W	L
(Thailand) 2025 Bangkok	did not qualify			
(Thailand) 2026 Bangkok	1st	5	4	1
Total	1/1	5	4	1
