= Marko Savić (basketball) =

Serbian basketball player

No. 5 – Novi Sad
- Position: Small forward
- League: FIBA 3X3 World Tour

Personal information
- Born: 2 June 1987 (age 39) Novi Sad, SR Serbia, SFR Yugoslavia
- Listed height: 1.97 m (6 ft 5 1/2 in)
- Listed weight: 105 kg (231 lb)

Career information
- Playing career: 2012–present

Career history
- 2012–present: Novi Sad (3x3 team)
- 2021–2022: Star

Career highlights
- 2x FIBA 3X3 World Tour winner (2014, 2015)
Medals
Men's 3x3 basketball
Representing Serbia
World Cup
Gold medal – first place	2012 Greece	Team
Gold medal – first place	2016 China	Team
Gold medal – first place	2017 France	Team
Gold medal – first place	2018 Philippines	Team
Silver medal – second place	2014 Russia	Team
European Championships
Gold medal – first place	2018 Romania	Team
Gold medal – first place	2019 Hungary	Team
Silver medal – second place	2016 Romania	Team
European Games
Bronze medal – third place	2015 Baku	Team

Marko Savić (Serbian Cyrillic: Марко Савић; born 2 June 1987) is a Serbian professional basketball player who is currently ranked world No. 2 in men's individual 3x3 rankings by the International Basketball Federation (FIBA). He plays for Novi Sad Al-Wahda and Serbia men's national 3x3 team.

== 3x3 basketball career ==
Savić started to play at the FIBA 3X3 World Tour in August 2012 with his childhood friends and current teammates Dušan Domović Bulut and Marko Ždero. He plays for United Arab Emirates based team Novi Sad Al-Wahda and won two FIBA 3x3 World Tours.

=== Serbia national team ===
Savić represents Serbia in 3x3 basketball. He won three gold medals at the FIBA 3x3 World Championships (2012 in Greece, 2016 in China and 2017 in France) and silver medal at the 2014 tournament in Russia.

== Awards and accomplishments ==
- FIBA 3x3 World Tour winner: 2 (2014, 2015)
- FIBA 3x3 World Tour runner-up: 1 (2013)
