= 2019 FIBA 3x3 Europe Cup =

3x3 basketball tournament

Tournament details
- Host country: Hungary
- City: Debrecen
- Dates: 30 August – 1 September 2019
- Venue: Kossuth Square

The 2019 FIBA 3x3 Europe Cup was the fifth edition of the 3x3 Europe Championships that is organized by FIBA Europe. It was held between 30 August and 1 September at the Kossuth Square in Debrecen, Hungary. The event was held on Kossuth Square in front of the iconic Reformed Great Church.

This 3x3 basketball event featured separate competitions for men's and women's national teams, with Serbia winning the men's bracket and France winning the women's bracket.

== Medalists ==
Event	Gold	Silver	Bronze
Men's team	Serbia; Dušan Bulut; Dejan Majstorović; Danilo Mijatović; Marko Savić	France; Lucas Dussoulier; Dominique Gentil; Charly Pontens; Raphaël Wilson	Lithuania; Paulius Beliavičius; Aurelijus Pukelis; Marijus Užupis; Šarūnas Vingelis
Women's team	France; Ana Maria Filip; Laëtitia Guapo; Marie-Ève Paget; Migna Touré	Spain; Aitana Cuevas; Vega Gimeno; Nuria Martínez; Sandra Ygueravide	Latvia; Baiba Eglīte; Ieva Kūlīte; Kristīna Petermane; Liene Stalidzāne
