= Marko Branković =

Serbian basketball player (born 1994)

Personal information
- Born: 12 August 1994 (age 32) Novi Sad, Serbia, FR Yugoslavia
- Listed height: 2.00 m (6 ft 7 in)
- Position: Small forward
Medals
Men's 3x3 basketball
Representing Serbia
FIBA 3x3 World Cup
Gold medal – first place	2022 Antwerp	Team
Gold medal – first place	2023 Vienna	Team
Bronze medal – third place	2025 Ulaanbaatar	Team
FIBA 3x3 Europe Cup
Gold medal – first place	2018 Bucharest
Gold medal – first place	2023 Jerusalem
Silver medal – second place	2024 Vienna

Marko Branković (Serbian: Марко Бранковић; born 12 August 1994) is a Serbian basketball player who plays as a small forward. He plays for the Serbian 3x3 national team.

== Career ==
Branković is 2.00 metres tall. He has played for Sloboda Užice, Hercegovac Gajdobra, Liman, and Vojvodina. Now he plays for the Serbian national team, with which he twice won gold at the FIBA 3x3 World Cup.
