= France women's national 3x3 team =

French basketball team

France
- FIBA ranking: 6
- FIBA zone: FIBA Europe

Olympic Games
- Appearances: 2

World Cup
- Appearances: 10
- Medals: Gold (2022); Silver (2012, 2023); Bronze (2018, 2019)

Europe Cup
- Appearances: 9
- Medals: Gold: (2018, 2019, 2022)

The France women's national 3x3 team is the national 3x3 basketball team of France, administered by the Fédération Française de Basketball. It represents the country in international 3x3 (3 against 3) women's basketball competitions.

In April 2021, France was ranked as No.1 in the world. They won 6 of 9 Women's Series 2019 and boasted the top three ranked players in the world in Laetitia Guapo, Migna Touré and Ana Maria Filip.

== Tournament record ==
=== Summer Olympics ===
Year	Position	Pld	W	L	Players
(Japan) 2020 Tokyo	4th	10	5	5	Cata-Chitiga, Guapo, Paget, Touré
(France) 2024 Paris	8th	7	2	5	Paget, Djekoundade, Guapo, Limouzin
Total	2/2	17	7	10	

=== World Cup ===
Year	Position	Pld	W	L
(Greece) 2012 Athens	2nd	9	8	1
(Russia) 2014 Moscow	5th	7	5	2
(China) 2016 Guangzhou	5th	5	3	2
(France) 2017 Nantes	10th	4	2	2
(Philippines) 2018 Bocaue	3rd	7	5	2
(Netherlands) 2019 Amsterdam	3rd	7	6	1
(Belgium) 2022 Antwerp	1st	8	7	1
(Austria) 2023 Vienna	2nd	8	6	2
(Mongolia) 2025 Ulaanbaatar	8th	5	4	1
(Poland) 2026 Warsaw	8th	6	3	3
2027 Singapore	To be determined			
Total	10/11	66	49	17

=== Europe Cup ===
Year	Position	Pld	W	L
(Romania) 2014 Bucharest	Did not qualify			
(Romania) 2016 Bucharest	Did not qualify			
(Netherlands) 2017 Amsterdam	4th	5	3	2
(Romania) 2018 Bucharest	1st	5	5	0
(Hungary) 2019 Debrecen	1st	5	4	1
(France) 2021 Paris	3rd	5	4	1
(Austria) 2022 Graz	1st	5	5	0
(Israel) 2023 Jerusalem	6th	3	2	1
(Austria) 2024 Vienna	2nd	5	4	1
(Denmark) 2025 Copenhagen	4th	5	2	3
(Belgium) 2026 Antwerp	6th	3	1	2
Total	9/11	41	30	11

=== Champions Cup ===
Year	Position	Pld	W	L
(Thailand) 2025 Bangkok	7th	3	0	3
(Thailand) 2026 Bangkok	did not qualify			
Total	1/1	3	0	3

== See also ==
- France men's national 3x3 team
- France mixed national 3x3 team
