= Mihailo Vasić =

Serbian basketball player (born 1993)

No. 3 – Liman 3x3
- Position: Forward
- League: FIBA 3x3 World Tour

Personal information
- Born: 20 July 1993 (age 33) Belgrade, Serbia, FR Yugoslavia
- Listed height: 1.99 m (6 ft 6 in)
- Listed weight: 103 kg (227 lb)

Career information
- High school: Lee Academy
- College: Harcum College (2014–2016); New Haven (2016–2018)
- NBA draft: 2018: undrafted

Career history
- 2011–2013: Vojvodina
- 2017–present: Liman 3x3
Medals
Men's 3x3 basketball
Representing Serbia
Olympic Games
| Bronze medal – third place | 2020 Tokyo | Team |
FIBA 3x3 World Cup
| Gold medal – first place | 2022 Antwerp | Team |
| Gold medal – first place | 2023 Vienna | Team |
Europe Cup
| Gold medal – first place | 2018 Bucharest |
| Gold medal – first place | 2021 Paris |
| Gold medal – first place | 2022 Graz |

Mihailo Vasić (Serbian Cyrillic: Михаило Васић; born 20 July 1993) is a Serbian 3x3 basketball player for Liman 3x3 of the FIBA 3x3 World Tour. He represents the Serbian national team at international level.

== Biography ==
Vasić grew up with a Novi Sad-based team Vojvodina. In 2013, he moved to the United States, where he played high school basketball with Lee Academy at senior level. As a college freshman and sophomore, Vasić played with the Harcum Bears of the National Junior College Athletic Association (NJCAA). In 2016, he joined the New Haven Chargers of the NCAA Division II where he played his junior and senior years. Vasić has been a member of Novi Sad-based club Liman 3x3 since 2017.

Vasić represents Serbian 3x3 national team at international level. He made his debut at the 2019 FIBA 3x3 World Cup where the team finished fourth place. He also represented Serbia at the 2020 Summer Olympics.
