= Šarūnas Vingelis =

Lithuanian basketball player (born 1989)

Personal information
- Born: 16 November 1989 (age 36) Rokiškis, Lithuania
- Listed height: 1.91 m (6 ft 3 in)
Medals
Men's 3x3 basketball
Representing Lithuania
Olympic Games
Bronze medal – third place	2024 Paris	Team
FIBA 3x3 Europe Cup
Silver medal – second place	2021 Paris
Silver medal – second place	2023 Jerusalem
Bronze medal – third place	2019 Debrecen

Šarūnas Vingelis (born 16 November 1989) is a Lithuanian basketball player. He represented Lithuania at the 2024 Summer Olympics in 3x3 event.
