= 2016 FIBA 3x3 World Championships – Men's tournament =

2016 FIBA 3x3 World Championships
Tournament details
- Host country: China
- City: Guangzhou
- Dates: October 11–15
- Teams: 20

Final positions
- Champions: Serbia (2nd title)
- Runners-up: United States
- Third place: Slovenia
- Fourth place: Spain

Tournament statistics
- MVP: (Serbia) Dušan Bulut

The 2016 FIBA 3x3 World Championships was held in Guangzhou, China, and was contested by 20 teams.

== Participating teams ==
All five FIBA zones were represented. The top 20 teams, including the hosts, based on the FIBA National Federation ranking qualified for the tournament.

FIBA Africa Team Egypt (18)	FIBA Americas Team United States (4) Uruguay (7)	FIBA Asia and FIBA Oceania Team Japan (12) Indonesia (15) Qatar (16) New Zealand (17) Philippines (19) China (20) {hosts}	FIBA Europe Team Serbia (1) Slovenia (2) Poland (3) Netherlands (5) Romania (6) Russia (8) Italy (9) Andorra (10) Spain (11) Turkey (13) Hungary (14)

== Preliminary round ==
=== Pool A ===
Pos	Team	Pld	W	L	PF	PA	PD	Qualification	(Serbia)	(Qatar)	(Russia)	(Italy)	(New Zealand)
1	Serbia	4	4	0	78	60	+18	Knockout stage	—	21–16	21–14	16–13	20–17
2	Qatar	4	3	1	76	69	+7	Knockout stage	16–21	—	20–17	19–15	21–16
3	Russia	4	2	2	73	70	+3		14–21	17–20	—	20–17	22–12
4	Italy	4	1	3	66	66	0		13–16	15–19	17–20	—	21–11
5	New Zealand	4	0	4	56	84	−28		17–20	16–21	12–22	11–21	—

Source: FIBA
Rules for classification: 1) Wins; 2) Head-to-Head record; 3) Points scored; 4) Higher seed.

=== Pool B ===
Pos	Team	Pld	W	L	PF	PA	PD	Qualification	(Slovenia)	(Uruguay)	(Indonesia)	(Andorra)	(Egypt)
1	Slovenia	4	4	0	82	43	+39	Knockout stage	—	21–9	21–7	19–13	21–14
2	Uruguay	4	2	2	57	66	−9	Knockout stage	9–21	—	21–15	18–14	9–16
3	Indonesia	4	2	2	63	81	−18		7–21	15–21	—	20–19	21–20
4	Andorra	4	1	3	67	71	−4		13–19	14–18	19–20	—	21–14
5	Egypt	4	1	3	64	72	−8		14–21	16–9	20–21	14–21	—

Source: FIBA
Rules for classification: 1) Wins; 2) Head-to-Head record; 3) Points scored; 4) Higher seed.

=== Pool C ===
Pos	Team	Pld	W	L	PF	PA	PD	Qualification	(Spain)	(Hungary)	(Philippines)	(Romania)	(Poland)
1	Spain	4	4	0	78	52	+26	Knockout stage	—	16–12	21–16	21–16	20–8
2	Hungary	4	3	1	57	56	+1	Knockout stage	12–16	—	18–16	13–11	14–13
3	Philippines	4	2	2	74	66	+8		16–21	16–18	—	21–19	21–8
4	Romania	4	1	3	66	71	−5		16–21	11–13	19–21	—	20–16
5	Poland	4	0	4	45	75	−30		8–20	13–14	8–21	16–20	—

Source: FIBA
Rules for classification: 1) Wins; 2) Head-to-Head record; 3) Points scored; 4) Higher seed.

=== Pool D ===
Pos	Team	Pld	W	L	PF	PA	PD	Qualification	(United States)	(Netherlands)	(Japan)	(Turkey)	(China)
1	United States	4	4	0	77	50	+27	Knockout stage	—	15–11	21–12	20–12	21–15
2	Netherlands	4	3	1	65	51	+14	Knockout stage	11–15	—	21–12	14–8	19–16
3	Japan	4	2	2	64	72	−8		12–21	12–21	—	21–16	19–14
4	Turkey	4	1	3	58	74	−16		12–20	8–14	16–21	—	22–19
5	China (H)	4	0	4	64	81	−17		15–21	16–19	14–19	19–22	—

Source: FIBA
Rules for classification: 1) Wins; 2) Head-to-Head record; 3) Points scored; 4) Higher seed.
(H) Hosts

== Knockout stage ==
Quarter-finals
Serbia	22
Netherlands	10
Spain	22
Uruguay	6
Slovenia	21
Hungary	10
United States	12
Qatar	11

Semi-finals
Serbia	17
Spain	13
Slovenia	15
United States	17

Final
Serbia	21
United States	16
Bronze Final
Spain	16
Slovenia	17

== Final standings ==
#	Team	Pld	W	L	PF	PA	PD
1st place, gold medalist(s)	Serbia	7	7	0	138	99	+39
2nd place, silver medalist(s)	United States	7	6	1	122	97	+25
3rd place, bronze medalist(s)	Slovenia	7	6	1	135	86	+49
4th	Spain	7	5	2	129	92	+37
Eliminated in the quarterfinals
5th	Qatar	5	4	1	87	81	+6
6th	Netherlands	5	4	1	75	73	+2
7th	Hungary	5	4	1	67	77	–10
8th	Uruguay	5	3	2	63	88	–25
Eliminated in the preliminary round
9th	Philippines	4	2	2	74	66	+8
10th	Russia	4	2	2	73	70	+3
11th	Japan	4	2	2	64	72	–8
12th	Indonesia	4	2	2	63	81	–18
13th	Italy	4	1	3	66	66	0
14th	Andorra	4	1	3	67	71	–4
15th	Romania	4	1	3	66	71	–5
16th	Egypt	4	1	3	64	72	–8
17th	Turkey	4	1	3	58	74	–16
18th	China	4	0	4	64	81	–17
19th	New Zealand	4	0	4	56	84	–28
20th	Poland	4	0	4	45	75	–30

== Awards ==
2016 FIBA 3x3 World Champions – Men's

Serbia
2nd title

=== Individual awards ===
Most Valuable Player

- (Serbia) Dušan Bulut (SRB)

Team of the Tournament

- (Serbia) Dušan Bulut (SRB)
- (United States) Myke Henry (USA)
- (Slovenia) Gašper Ovnik (SLO)

Dunk Contest Champion

- (Ukraine) Dmytro Krivenko (UKR)
