= Strahinja Stojačić =

Serbian basketball player

Personal information
- Born: 15 July 1992 (age 34) Novi Sad, FR Yugoslavia
- Listed height: 2.01 m (6 ft 7 in)
- Listed weight: 91 kg (201 lb)

Career information
- NBA draft: 2013: undrafted
- Playing career: 2009–present
- Position: Shooting guard

Career history
- 2009–2010: Mega Vizura
- 2010–2013: Radnički Kragujevac
- 2012–2013: → Smederevo 1953
- 2013–2016: Konstantin
- 2016–2017: Lučenec
- 2017–2018: Nova Hut Ostrava
- 2018: FMP
- 2018–2019: Nova Hut Ostrava
- 2020–2022: Hercegovac Gajdobra
- 2022–: Ub (3x3)

Career highlights
- FIBA 3x3 World Cup MVP (2023); FIBA World Cup Team of the Tournament (2023, 2025, 2026); FIBA 3x3 Europe Cup MVP (2023); FIBA 3x3 Europe Cup Team of the Tournament (2023, 2024); 3× FIBA 3x3 World Tour winner (2022, 2023, 2025); 3× FIBA 3x3 World Tour MVP (2022, 2023, 2025); 2× FIBA 3x3 World Tour Top scorer (2022, 2023); Serbian Most Successful Individual in Team Sports (2023)
Medals
Men's 3x3 basketball
Representing Serbia
World Cup
Gold medal – first place	2022 Antwerp	Team
Gold medal – first place	2023 Vienna	Team
Bronze medal – third place	2025 Ulaanbaatar	Team
Bronze medal – third place	2026 Warsaw	Team
Europe Cup
Gold medal – first place	2022 Graz
Gold medal – first place	2023 Jerusalem
Silver medal – second place	2024 Vienna

Strahinja Stojačić (Serbian Cyrillic: Страхиња Стојачић; born 15 July 1992), nicknamed "Brka" and "Doctor Strange", is a Serbian professional basketball player who last played for Hercegovac Gajdobra of the Second Basketball League of Serbia. He also played at the FIBA 3x3 World Tour for Ub Huishan NE and Serbia men's national 3x3 team.
