= 2012 FIBA 3x3 World Championships =

Παγκόσμιο Πρωτάθλημα FIBA 3x3 2012

Tournament details
- Host country: Greece
- City: Athens
- Dates: 23–26 August 2012
- Teams: 64
- Venue: 1 (in 1 host city)

The 2012 FIBA 3x3 World Championships, hosted by Greece, was the first edition of the FIBA 3x3 World Championships, an international 3x3 basketball event that featured separate competitions for men's, women's and mixed national teams. The tournament ran from 23 August to 26 August 2012, held in front of the Zappeion. It was co-organized by the FIBA.

Serbia won the men's title after defeating France 16–13 in the men's final.

The US won the women's title after defeating France in the final, while France defeated Argentina for the mixed team final.

== Medalists ==
Event	Gold	Silver	Bronze
Men's	Serbia	France	Ukraine
Women's	United States	France	Australia
Mixed	France	Argentina	Ukraine

== Participating teams ==
=== Men ===
Group A

- Brazil
- Bulgaria
- Estonia
- Israel
- Greece
- Russia

Group B

- Czech Republic
- Latvia
- Nepal
- Serbia
- Slovenia
- Spain

Group C

- Argentina
- France
- Guam
- Mexico
- Ukraine
- Venezuela

Group D

- Egypt
- England
- Lebanon
- Romania
- Turkey
- United States

=== Women ===
Group A

- Australia
- Ukraine
- Chinese Taipei
- Estonia
- Brazil
- Mexico

Group B

- France
- Hungary
- Czech Republic
- Greece
- Slovakia
- Nepal

Group C

- Russia
- Spain
- England
- Turkey
- Romania
- Jordan

Group D

- United States
- Argentina
- Bulgaria
- Germany
- Angola
- Netherlands

=== Mixed ===
- Argentina
- Brazil
- Bulgaria
- Czech Republic

- England
- Estonia
- France
- Greece

- Jordan
- Mexico
- Nepal
- Romania

- Russia
- Spain
- Turkey
- Ukraine
