= Dejan Majstorović =

Serbian 3x3 basketball player

Dejan Majstorović Дејан Мајсторовић
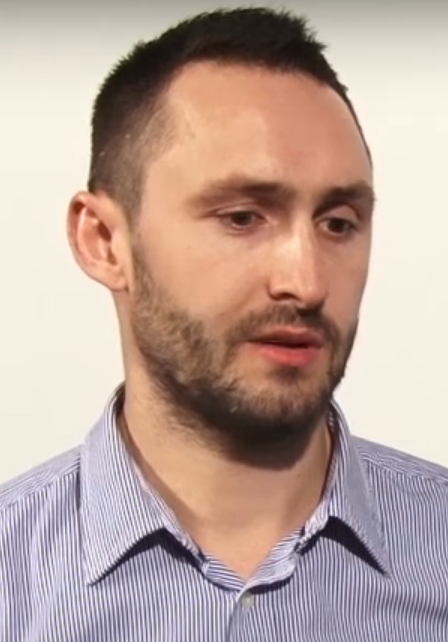
- Majstorović in 2016

Ub
- Position: Shooting guard / small forward
- League: FIBA 3X3 World Tour

Personal information
- Born: 22 April 1988 (age 38) Stari Banovci, SR Serbia, SFR Yugoslavia
- Listed height: 2.00 m (6 ft 7 in)
- Listed weight: 101 kg (223 lb)

Career information
- Playing career: 2013–present

Career history
- 2013–2014: Master Caffe 3x3
- 2014–2021: Novi Sad 3x3
- 2021–present: Ub

Career highlights
- 2x FIBA 3x3 World Cup MVP (2017, 2022); 2x FIBA 3X3 World Tour winner (2014, 2015)
Medals
Men's 3x3 basketball
Representing Serbia
Olympic Games
Bronze medal – third place	2020 Tokyo	Team
World Cup
Gold medal – first place	2016 China	Team
Gold medal – first place	2017 France	Team
Gold medal – first place	2018 Philippines	Team
Gold medal – first place	2022 Antwerp	Team
Gold medal – first place	2023 Vienna	Team
Silver medal – second place	2014 Russia	Team
Bronze medal – third place	2025 Ulaanbaatar	Team
Europe Cup
Gold medal – first place	2018 Romania
Gold medal – first place	2019 Hungary
Gold medal – first place	2021 France
Silver medal – second place	2016 Romania
European Games
Bronze medal – third place	2015 Baku	Team

Dejan Majstorović (Serbian Cyrillic: Дејан Мајсторовић; born 22 April 1988) is a Serbian professional 3x3 basketball player who is currently ranked world No. 2 in men's individual 3x3 rankings by the International Basketball Federation (FIBA). He plays for Ub Huishan NE and Serbia men's national 3x3 team. He is the most-decorated Serbian 3x3 basketball player, having earned five gold medals and one silver medal in World Cups.

== Career ==
Majstorović started to play at the FIBA 3X3 World Tour in June 2013. He plays for Serbia-based team Ub. In 2014, Majstorović was invited to play basketball in Novi Sad and Hungarian city Szeged, but never had a chance to play the sport as he was devoted to 3x3 basketball.

Majstorović represents Serbia in 3x3 basketball. He won two gold medals at the FIBA 3x3 World Championships, 2016 in China and 2017 in France and silver medal at the 2014 tournament in Russia. He was named MVP of the FIBA 3x3 World Cup 2017 and selected to the FIBA 3x3 World Cup 2017 Team of the Tournament.

Following the 2025 FIBA 3x3 World Cup, Majstorović suffered a short-term injury in July and had to undergo surgery, which began the process of treatment and rehabilitation.
