= 2026 FIBA 3x3 World Cup – Women's tournament =

2026 FIBA 3x3 World Cup

Tournament details
- Host country: Poland
- City: Warsaw
- Dates: 1–7 June
- Teams: 20

Final positions
- Champions: United States (4th title)
- Runners-up: Australia
- Third place: Netherlands
- Fourth place: Azerbaijan

Tournament statistics
- MVP: (United States) Mikaylah Williams

The 2026 FIBA 3x3 World Cup was being held in Warsaw, Poland from 1 to 7 June 2026, and contested by 20 teams.

The United States won their fourth title, with a finals win over Australia.

== Qualified teams ==
The host, along the winners of the four zone cups of four FIBA zones, and the three winners of the qualifiers qualified. The other twelve teams qualified based on the FIBA National Federation rankings.

Team	Qualification method	Appearance(s)				Previous best performance (Note: Bold text indicates they hosted that edition.)	WR (Note: 3x3 World Rankings at the start of the event.)
Team	Qualification method	Total	First	Last	Streak	Previous best performance	WR
Poland	Host nation	5th	2016	2025	4	Fourth place (2025)	TBD
Australia	2025 3x3 Asia Cup	7th	2012	2025	3	Third place (2012, 2023)	TBD
China	FIBA National Federation rankings	9th	2014	2025	9	Champions (2019)	TBD
Japan	FIBA National Federation rankings	5th	2016	2025	5	Ninth place (2023, 2025)	TBD
Mongolia	FIBA National Federation rankings	5th	2019	2025	5	Runners-up (2025)	TBD
Azerbaijan	FIBA National Federation rankings	1st	Debut				TBD
Czech Republic	FIBA National Federation rankings	9th	2012	2025	4	Champions (2016)	TBD
France	FIBA National Federation rankings	10th	2012	2025	10	Champions (2022)	TBD
Germany	FIBA National Federation rankings	8th	2012	2025	4	Fifth place (2023)	TBD
Italy	FIBA National Federation rankings	5th	2014	2025	4	Champions (2018)	TBD
Latvia	FIBA National Federation rankings	3rd	2019	2025	2	15th place (2019)	TBD
Netherlands	2025 3x3 Europe Cup	10th	2012	2025	10	Champions (2025)	TBD
Spain	FIBA National Federation rankings	10th	2012	2025	10	Fourth place (2016)	TBD
Ukraine	FIBA National Federation rankings	7th	2012	2025	2	Runners-up (2016)	TBD
Canada	FIBA National Federation rankings	4th	2022	2025	4	Runners-up (2022)	TBD
United States	2025 3x3 AmeriCup	8th	2012	2025	4	Champions (2012, 2014, 2023)	TBD
Madagascar	2025 3x3 Africa Cup	2nd	2025		2	20th place (2025)	TBD
Hungary	3x3 World Cup Qualifier	9th	2012	2025	3	Runners-up (2017, 2019)	TBD
Lithuania	3x3 World Cup Qualifier	3rd	2022	2023	1	Fourth place (2022)	TBD
Philippines	3x3 World Cup Qualifier	2nd	2018		1	17th place (2018)	TBD

== Players ==
Seed	Team	Players			
1	Netherlands	Noortje Driessen	Ilse Kuijt	Zoë Slagter	Lotte van Kruistum
2	Spain	Txell Alarcón	Gracia Alonso de Armiño	Cecilia Muhate	Alba Prieto
3	China	Li Wenxia	Li Yuyan	Wang Lili	Zhang Zhiting
4	France	Laëtitia Guapo	Hortense Limouzin	Marie Mané	Marie Milapie
5	Canada	Kacie Bosch	Paige Crozon	Katherine Plouffe	Tara Wallack
6	Germany	Britta Daub	Ama Degbeon	Marie Reichert	Laura Zolper
7	United States	Joyce Edwards	MiLaysia Fulwiley	Mikaylah Williams	Sahara Williams
8	Poland	Klaudia Gertchen	Anna Pawłowska	Weronika Telenga	Aleksandra Zięmborska
9	Czech Republic	Monika Fučíková	Kateřina Galíčková	Karolina Sotolová	Lucie Svatoňová
10	Mongolia	Bat-Erdeniin Ariuntsetseg	Battsoojiin Bolor-Erdene	Erdenebayangiin Narangoo	Onolbaataryn Khulan
11	Italy	Beatrice Caloro	Caterina Gilli	Maria Miccoli	Giorgia Palmieri
12	Japan	Aoi Katsura	Kiho Miyashita	Miku Takahashi	Aya Tsurumi
13	Hungary	Vivi Böröndy	Réka Lelik	Klaudia Papp	Virág Takács-Kiss
14	Ukraine	Krystyna Filevych	Kateryna Koval	Anzhelika Liashko	Miriam Uro-Nilie
15	Latvia	Paula Cirša	Marta Miščenko	Digna Strautmane	Ketija Vihmane
16	Australia	Amy Atwell	Emma Clarke	Hannah Hank	Marena Whittle
17	Philippines	Afril Bernardino	Mikka Cacho	Camille Clarin	Kacey Dela Rosa
18	Lithuania	Giedrė Labuckienė	Justina Miknaitė	Kamilė Nacickaitė	Gabrielė Šulskė
19	Azerbaijan	Arica Carter	Brianna Fraser	Alexandra Mollenhauer	Dina Ulyanova
20	Madagascar	Harisoa Hajanirina	Minaoharisoa Jaofera	Ravaka Randriatahiana	Tokin'laina Sambatrarimiora

== Preliminary round ==
The pools were announced on 15 April 2026.

All times are local (UTC+2).

=== Pool A ===
Pos	Team	Pld	W	L	PF	PA	PR	Qualification
1	Netherlands	4	4	0	73	43	1.698	Quarterfinals
2	Azerbaijan	4	3	1	68	56	1.214	Round of 16
3	Czech Republic	4	2	2	48	48	1.000	Round of 16
4	Poland (H)	4	1	3	55	65	0.846	
5	Madagascar	4	0	4	45	77	0.584	

Source: FIBA
Rules for classification: 1) Wins; 2) Head-to-head record; 3) Points scored.
(H) Hosts

1 June 2026
17:05

Boxscore

Azerbaijan	21–13	Madagascar
Pts: Fraser 11		Pts: Jaofera 8

Parade Square, Warsaw
Referees: Marek Maliszewski (POL), Gonzalo Chiapponi (URU)

1 June 2026
18:30

Boxscore

Czech Republic	8–12	Netherlands
Pts: Galíčková 4		Pts: Kuijt 6

Parade Square, Warsaw
Referees: Brigitta Csabai-Kaskötő (HUN), Dorothy Okatch (BOT)

1 June 2026
18:55

Boxscore

Poland	20–10	Madagascar
Pts: Zięmborska 10		Pts: Jaofera 7

Parade Square, Warsaw
Referees: Gonzalo Chiapponi (URU), Brigitta Csabai-Kaskötő (HUN)

1 June 2026
20:20

Boxscore

Netherlands	19–13	Azerbaijan
Pts: Kuijt 8		Pts: Fraser 8

Parade Square, Warsaw
Referees: Miroslava Jovičin (SRB), Gonzalo Chiapponi (URU)

1 June 2026
20:45

Boxscore

Poland	12–14	Czech Republic
Pts: Zięmborska 4		Pts: Sotolová, Svatoňová 6

Parade Square, Warsaw
Referees: Dorothy Okatch (BOT), Miroslava Jovičin (SRB)

3 June 2026
17:05

Boxscore

Czech Republic	11–14	Azerbaijan
Pts: Sotolová 5		Pts: Fraser 6

Parade Square, Warsaw
Referees: Marek Maliszewski (POL), Gonzalo Chiapponi (URU)

3 June 2026
18:30

Boxscore

Madagascar	12–21	Netherlands
Pts: Hajanirina 5		Pts: Kuijt 7

Parade Square, Warsaw
Referees: Dorothy Okatch (BOT), Brigitta Csabai-Kaskötő (HUN)

3 June 2026
18:55

Boxscore

Azerbaijan	20–13	Poland
Pts: Fraser 8		Pts: Zięmborska 6

Parade Square, Warsaw
Referees: Miroslava Jovičin (SRB), Gonzalo Chiapponi (URU)

3 June 2026
20:20

Boxscore

Madagascar	10–15	Czech Republic
Pts: Sambatrarimiora 5		Pts: Galíčková 5

Parade Square, Warsaw
Referees: Dorothy Okatch (BOT), Marek Maliszewski (POL)

3 June 2026
20:45

Boxscore

Netherlands	21–10	Poland
Pts: Driessen, Van Kruistum 7		Pts: Gertchen 5

Parade Square, Warsaw
Referees: Brigitta Csabai-Kaskötő (HUN), Miroslava Jovičin (SRB)

=== Pool B ===
Pos	Team	Pld	W	L	PF	PA	PR	Qualification
1	United States	4	4	0	80	68	1.176	Quarterfinals
2	Australia	4	2 (Note: Head-to-head: One win, one loss, ranked by points scored.)	2	78	74	1.054	Round of 16
3	Hungary	4	2	2	71	57	1.246	Round of 16
4	Spain	4	2	2	63	71	0.887	
5	Mongolia	4	0	4	49	71	0.690	

Source: FIBA
Rules for classification: 1) Wins; 2) Head-to-head record; 3) Points scored.
Notes:

2 June 2026
17:05

Boxscore

Hungary	21–12	Spain
Pts: Takács-Kiss 7		Pts: Alarcón 5

Parade Square, Warsaw
Referees: Dorothy Okatch (BOT), Gonzalo Chiapponi (URU)

2 June 2026
18:30

Boxscore

Mongolia	15–21	Australia
Pts: Onolbaataryn 7		Pts: Hank 9

Parade Square, Warsaw
Referees: Brigitta Csabai-Kaskötő (HUN), Dorothy Okatch (BOT)

2 June 2026
18:55

Boxscore

United States	18–15	Hungary
Pts: S. Williams 7		Pts: Takács-Kiss 8

Parade Square, Warsaw
Referees: Marek Maliszewski (POL), Dorothy Okatch (BOT)

2 June 2026
20:20

Boxscore

Mongolia	11–13	Spain
Pts: Khulan 4		Pts: Muhate 5

Parade Square, Warsaw
Referees: Dorothy Okatch (BOT), Miroslava Jovičin (SRB)

2 June 2026
20:45

Boxscore

Australia	18–21	United States
Pts: Atwell 9		Pts: M. Williams 9

Parade Square, Warsaw
Referees: Miroslava Jovičin (SRB), Marek Maliszewski (POL)

4 June 2026
17:05

Boxscore

Spain	20–18	Australia
Pts: Alarcón, Prieto 9		Pts: Whittle 9

Parade Square, Warsaw
Referees: Gonzalo Chiapponi (URU), Marek Maliszewski (POL)

4 June 2026
18:30

Boxscore

United States	20–17	Mongolia
Pts: Edwards 7		Pts: Khulan 14

Parade Square, Warsaw
Referees: Brigitta Csabai-Kaskötő (HUN), Dorothy Okatch (BOT)

4 June 2026
18:55

Boxscore

Australia	21–18	Hungary
Pts: Atwell 8		Pts: Takács-Kiss 8

Parade Square, Warsaw
Referees: Marek Maliszewski (POL), Dorothy Okatch (BOT)

4 June 2026
20:20

Boxscore

Spain	18–21	United States
Pts: Alarcón 7		Pts: M. Williams 11

Parade Square, Warsaw
Referees: Miroslava Jovičin (SRB), Marek Maliszewski (POL)

4 June 2026
20:45

Boxscore

Hungary	17–6	Mongolia
Pts: Böröndy 7		Pts: Bat-Erdene, Khulan 3

Parade Square, Warsaw
Referees: Dorothy Okatch (BOT), Miroslava Jovičin (SRB)

=== Pool C ===
Pos	Team	Pld	W	L	PF	PA	PR	Qualification
1	Germany	4	4	0	74	48	1.542	Quarterfinals
2	Latvia	4	3	1	72	57	1.263	Round of 16
3	China	4	2	2	71	66	1.076	Round of 16
4	Philippines	4	1	3	50	68	0.735	
5	Italy	4	0	4	46	74	0.622	

Source: FIBA
Rules for classification: 1) Wins; 2) Head-to-head record; 3) Points scored.

1 June 2026
12:30

Boxscore

China	14–21	Germany
Pts: Li W., Wang 5		Pts: Degbeon, Zolper 7

Parade Square, Warsaw
Referees: Gonzalo Chiapponi (URU), Marek Maliszewski (POL)

1 June 2026
12:55

Boxscore

Latvia	14–11	Philippines
Pts: Miščenko, Strautmane 5		Pts: Dela Rosa 5

Parade Square, Warsaw
Referees: Marek Maliszewski (POL), Miroslava Jovičin (SRB)

1 June 2026
14:20

Boxscore

Italy	12–21	China
Pts: Gilli, Palmieri 4		Pts: Li W. 9

Parade Square, Warsaw
Referees: Brigitta Csabai-Kaskötő (HUN), Dorothy Okatch (BOT)

1 June 2026
14:45

Boxscore

Germany	22–10	Philippines
Pts: Degbeon 10		Pts: Cacho, Dela Rosa 4

Parade Square, Warsaw
Referees: Miroslava Jovičin (SRB), Brigitta Csabai-Kaskötő (HUN)

1 June 2026
16:40

Boxscore

Italy	13–21	Latvia
Pts: Gilli 6		Pts: Vihmane 7

Parade Square, Warsaw
Referees: Dorothy Okatch (BOT), Marek Maliszewski (POL)

3 June 2026
12:30

Boxscore

Philippines	12–20	China
Pts: Bernardino, Dela Rosa 4		Pts: Wang 7

Parade Square, Warsaw
Referees: Gonzalo Chiapponi (URU), Dorothy Okatch (BOT)

3 June 2026
12:55

Boxscore

Germany	15–8	Italy
Pts: Zolper 6		Pts: Gilli, Miccoli 3

Parade Square, Warsaw
Referees: Miroslava Jovičin (SRB), Brigitta Csabai-Kaskötő (HUN)

3 June 2026
14:20

Boxscore

China	16–21	Latvia
Pts: Li W. 7		Pts: Vihmane 8

Parade Square, Warsaw
Referees: Gonzalo Chiapponi (URU), Marek Maliszewski (POL)

3 June 2026
14:45

Boxscore

Philippines	17–13	Italy
Pts: Clarin 8		Pts: Gilli 9

Parade Square, Warsaw
Referees: Marek Maliszewski (POL), Dorothy Okatch (BOT)

3 June 2026
16:40

Boxscore

Latvia	16–17	Germany
Pts: Miščenko 8		Pts: Daub, Reichert 5

Parade Square, Warsaw
Referees: Brigitta Csabai-Kaskötő (HUN), Miroslava Jovičin (SRB)

=== Pool D ===
Pos	Team	Pld	W	L	PF	PA	PR	Qualification
1	Ukraine	4	3	1	57	56	1.018	Quarterfinals
2	France	4	2 (Note: Head-to-head: Two wins against Lithuania and Canada)	2	60	51	1.176	Round of 16
3	Lithuania	4	2 (Note: Head-to-head: One win, one loss: one victory against Canada)	2	66	65	1.015	Round of 16
4	Canada	4	2 (Note: Head-to-head: Two losses against France and Lithuania)	2	57	57	1.000	
5	Japan	4	1	3	56	67	0.836	

Source: FIBA
Rules for classification: 1) Wins; 2) Head-to-head record; 3) Points scored.
Notes:

2 June 2026
12:30

Boxscore

Canada	17–19	Lithuania
Pts: Crozon 8		Pts: Nacickaitė 10

Parade Square, Warsaw
Referees: Gonzalo Chiapponi (URU), Brigitta Csabai-Kaskötő (HUN)

2 June 2026
12:55

Boxscore

Japan	16–13	France
Pts: Katsura 6		Pts: Guapo 5

Parade Square, Warsaw
Referees: Brigitta Csabai-Kaskötő (HUN), Miroslava Jovičin (SRB)

2 June 2026
14:20

Boxscore

Ukraine	11–14	Canada
Pts: Liashko 4		Pts: Bosch, Crozon 6

Parade Square, Warsaw
Referees: Gonzalo Chiapponi (URU), Marek Maliszewski (POL)

2 June 2026
14:45

Boxscore

Lithuania	12–21	France
Pts: Labuckienė, Nacickaitė 4		Pts: Mané 10

Parade Square, Warsaw
Referees: Miroslava Jovičin (SRB), Gonzalo Chiapponi (URU)

2 June 2026
16:40

Boxscore

Japan	18–19	Ukraine
Pts: Takahashi 6		Pts: Filevych 10

Parade Square, Warsaw
Referees: Marek Maliszewski (POL), Brigitta Csabai-Kaskötő (HUN)

4 June 2026
12:30

Boxscore

France	10–11	Ukraine
Pts: Mané 4		Pts: Filevych 6

Parade Square, Warsaw
Referees: Miroslava Jovičin (SRB), Gonzalo Chiapponi (URU)

4 June 2026
12:55

Boxscore

Canada	14–11	Japan
Pts: Bosch 5		Pts: Katsura 6

Parade Square, Warsaw
Referees: Brigitta Csabai-Kaskötő (HUN), Miroslava Jovičin (SRB)

4 June 2026
14:20

Boxscore

Ukraine	16–14	Lithuania
Pts: Uro-Nilie 6		Pts: Nacickaitė 7

Parade Square, Warsaw
Referees: Dorothy Okatch (BOT), Brigitta Csabai-Kaskötő (HUN)

4 June 2026
14:45

Boxscore

France	16–12	Canada
Pts: Limouzin 6		Pts: Crozon 4

Parade Square, Warsaw
Referees: Marek Maliszewski (POL), Gonzalo Chiapponi (URU)

4 June 2026
16:40

Boxscore

Lithuania	21–11	Japan
Pts: Šulskė 8		Pts: Takahashi 8

Parade Square, Warsaw
Referees: Gonzalo Chiapponi (URU), Brigitta Csabai-Kaskötő (HUN)

== Knockout stage ==
=== Bracket ===
Round of 16
5 June
Latvia	16
Hungary	17
5 June
Australia	21
China	11
5 June
Azerbaijan (OT)	14
Lithuania	12
5 June
France	10
Czech Republic	9

Quarter-finals
6 June
Netherlands	21
Hungary	20
6 June
Australia	21
Ukraine	10
6 June
Germany	16
Azerbaijan	18
6 June
France	16
United States	18

Semi-finals
7 June
Netherlands	14
Australia	16
7 June
Azerbaijan	18
United States (OT)	19

Final
7 June
Australia	20
United States	21
Third place
7 June
Netherlands	21
Azerbaijan	14

=== Round of 16 ===
5 June 2026
18:00

Boxscore

Latvia	16–17	Hungary
Pts: Vihmane 7		Pts: Lelik, Takács-Kiss 5

Parade Square, Warsaw
Referees: Marek Maliszewski (POL), Gonzalo Chiapponi (URU)

5 June 2026
18:25

Boxscore

Australia	21–11	China
Pts: Atwell 9		Pts: Wang 6

Parade Square, Warsaw
Referees: Miroslava Jovičin (SRB), Dorothy Okatch (BOT)

5 June 2026
20:00

Boxscore

Azerbaijan	14–12 (OT)	Lithuania
Pts: Fraser 7		Pts: Miknaitė 4

Parade Square, Warsaw
Referees: Miroslava Jovičin (SRB), Brigitta Csabai-Kaskötő (HUN)

5 June 2026
20:25

Boxscore

France	10–9	Czech Republic
Pts: Limouzin 4		Pts: Galíčková 4

Parade Square, Warsaw
Referees: Brigitta Csabai-Kaskötő (HUN), Marek Maliszewski (POL)

=== Quarterfinals ===
6 June 2026
17:00

Boscore

Netherlands	21–20	Hungary
Pts: Van Kruistum, Slagter 8		Pts: Takács-Kiss 9

Parade Square, Warsaw
Referees: Miroslava Jovičin (SRB), Marek Maliszewski (POL)

6 June 2026
17:25

Boscore

Australia	21–10	Ukraine
Pts: Whittle 8		Pts: Uro-Nilie 5

Parade Square, Warsaw
Referees: Dorothy Okatch (BOT), Gonzalo Chiapponi (URU)

6 June 2026
19:00

Boscore

Germany	16–18	Azerbaijan
Pts: Reichert, Zolper 6		Pts: Fraser 9

Parade Square, Warsaw
Referees: Marek Maliszewski (POL), Brigitta Csabai-Kaskötő (HUN)

6 June 2026
19:25

Boxscore

France	16–18	United States
Pts: Limouzin 7		Pts: M. Williams 8

Parade Square, Warsaw
Referees: Miroslava Jovičin (SRB), Gonzalo Chiapponi (URU)

=== Semifinals ===
7 June 2026
17:00

Boxscore

Netherlands	14–16	Australia
Pts: Kuijt 7		Pts: Atwell 8

Parade Square, Warsaw
Referees: Marek Maliszewski (POL), Brigitta Csabai-Kaskötő (HUN)

7 June 2026
17:30

Boxscore

Azerbaijan	18–19 (OT)	United States
Pts: Mollenhauer 11		Pts: M. Williams 9

Parade Square, Warsaw
Referees: Miroslava Jovičin (SRB), Gonzalo Chiapponi (URU)

=== Third place game ===
7 June 2026
19:35

Boxscore

Netherlands	21–14	Azerbaijan
Pts: Driessen 13		Pts: Ulyanova, Carter 5

Parade Square, Warsaw
Referees: Brigitta Csabai-Kaskötő (HUN), Gonzalo Chiapponi (URU)

=== Final ===
7 June 2026
20:45

Boxscore

Australia	20–21	United States
Pts: Whittle 11		Pts: Fulwiley 9

Parade Square, Warsaw
Referees: Marek Maliszewski (POL), Miroslava Jovičin (SRB)

== Final ranking ==
Rank	Team	Record
1st place, gold medalist(s)	United States	7–0
2nd place, silver medalist(s)	Australia	5–3
3rd place, bronze medalist(s)	Netherlands	6–1
4	Azerbaijan	5–3
5	Germany	4–1
6	Ukraine	3–2
7	Hungary	3–3
8	France	3–3
9	Latvia	3–2
10	China	2–3
11	Lithuania	2–3
12	Czech Republic	2–3
13	Spain	2–2
14	Canada	2–2
15	Japan	1–3
16	Poland	1–3
17	Philippines	1–3
18	Mongolia	0–4
19	Italy	0–4
20	Madagascar	0–4

== Statistics and awards ==
=== Statistical leaders ===
Name	Points
(Australia) Amy Atwell	49
(United States) Mikaylah Williams	46
(Azerbaijan) Brianna Fraser	45
(Australia) Marena Whittle	43
(Netherlands) Noortje Driessen	41

=== Awards ===
The awards were announced on 8 June 2026.

All-Star team
(United States) Mikaylah Williams
(Australia) Amy Atwell
(Netherlands) Noortje Driessen
MVP
(United States) Mikaylah Williams
