= List of European Games medalists in 3x3 basketball =

3x3 basketball has been contested at the European Games since the inaugural event in 2015. As of 2023, no athlete managed to win a medal at the Games more than once.

== Men ==
Games	Gold	Silver	Bronze
2015 Baku	Russia; Ilia Aleksandrov; Andrey Kanygin; Leopold Lagutin; Aleksandr Pavlov	Spain; Sergio de la Fuente; Álex Llorca; Nacho Martín; Juan Vasco	Serbia; Dušan Domović Bulut; Dejan Majstorović; Marko Savić; Marko Ždero
2019 Minsk	Russia; Ilia Karpenkov; Kirill Pisklov; Stanislav Sharov; Alexey Zherdev	Latvia; Armands Ginters; Roberts Pāže; Armands Seņkāns; Mārtiņš Šteinbergs	Belarus; Maxim Liutych; Mikita Meshcharakou; Andrei Rahozenka; Siarhei Vabishchevich
2023 Kraków	Latvia; Kārlis Apsītis; Kristaps Gludītis; Francis Lācis; Zigmārs Raimo	Belgium; Caspar Augustijnen; Bryan De Valck; Dennis Donkor; Thibaut Vervoort	Poland; Adrian Bogucki; Szymon Rduch; Mateusz Szlachetka; Przemysław Zamojski

== Women ==
Games	Gold	Silver	Bronze
2015 Baku	Russia; Tatiana Petrushina; Tatiana Vidmer; Mariia Cherepanova; Anna Leshkovtseva	Ukraine; Viktoriia Paziuk; Krystyna Matsko; Olga Maznichenko; Ganna Zarytska	Spain; Vega Gimeno; Arantxa Novo; Esther Montenegro; Inmaculada Zanoguera
2019 Minsk	France; Mousdandy Djaldi-Tabdi; Caroline Hériaud; Assitan Koné; Johanna Tayeau	Estonia; Merike Anderson; Kadri-Ann Lass; Annika Köster; Janne Pulk	Belarus; Natallia Dashkevich; Maryna Ivashchanka; Darya Mahalias; Anastasiya Sushczyk
2023 Kraków	Lithuania; Giedrė Labuckienė; Kamilė Nacickaitė; Martyna Petrėnaitė; Gabrielė Šulskė	France; Myriam Djekoundade; Hortense Limouzin; Marie Mané; Anna Ngo Ndjock	Spain; Cecilia Muhate; Helena Oma; Alba Prieto; Natalia Rodríguez
