= Basketball at the 2023 European Games – Women's tournament =

Tournament details
- Host country: Poland
- City: Kraków
- Dates: 21–24 June
- Teams: 16 (from 1 confederation)
- Venue: 1 (in 1 host city)

Final positions
- Champions: Lithuania (1st title)
- Runners-up: France
- Third place: Spain
- Fourth place: Romania

The women's 3x3 basketball tournament at the 2023 European Games was held in Kraków, Poland at the Cracovia Arena from 21 to 24 June 2023.

== Pools composition ==
Teams were seeded following the serpentine system according to their FIBA 3x3 Federation Ranking.

Pool A	Pool B	Pool C	Pool D
France	Germany	Lithuania	Netherlands
Hungary	Romania	Poland	Spain
Czechia	Austria	Ukraine	Israel
Latvia	Greece	Estonia	Switzerland

== Team rosters ==
Austria	Czechia	Estonia	France
Alexia Allesch; Anja Fuchs-Robetin; Rebekka Kalaydjiev; Camilla Neumann	Kateřina Galíčková; Alžběta Levínská; Tereza Motyčáková; Tereza Pogányová	Sofia Kosareva; Annika Köster; Kadri-Ann Lass; Marie Anette Sepp	Myriam Djekoundade; Hortense Limouzin; Marie Mané; Anna Ngo Ndjock
Germany	Greece	Hungary	Israel
Emma Eichmeyer; Victoria Poros; Marie Reichert; Luana Rodefeld	Maria Anastasopoulou; Varvara Mylonaki; Nefeli Stoupa; Aikaterini Tsineke	Boglárka Bach; Zsófia Jáhni; Fanni Szabó; Virág Weninger	Shani Berman; Noor Kayuf; Ofir Kesten Raz; May Nesher
Latvia	Lithuania	Netherlands	Poland
Ieva Korzāne; Marta Leimane; Paula Mauriņa; Katrina Trankale	Giedrė Labuckienė; Kamilė Nacickaitė; Martyna Petrėnaitė; Gabrielė Šulskė	Jade Blagrove; Janis Boonstra; Emy Hayford; Jacobine Klerx	Julia Drop; Marta Marcinkowska; Aldona Morawiec; Anna Pawłowska
Romania	Spain	Switzerland	Ukraine
Sonia Kim; Teodora Manea; Alina Podar; Anamaria Vîrjoghe	Cecilia Muhate; Helena Oma; Alba Prieto; Natalia Rodríguez	Eléa Jacquot; Gloria Loosa; Lin Schwarz; Lana Wenger	Krystyna Filevych; Veronika Kosmach; Oksana Mollova; Miriam Uro-Nilie

== Preliminary round ==
All times are local (UTC+2).

=== Pool A ===
Pos	Team	Pld	W	L	PF	Qualification
1	France	3	3	0	50	Quarterfinals
2	Czechia	3	2	1	48	Quarterfinals
3	Hungary	3	1	2	43	
4	Latvia	3	0	3	24	

Source: EG2023
Rules for classification: 1) Wins; 2) Head-to-head record; 3) Points scored.

21 June 2023
14:30

Boxscore

France	14–4	Latvia
Pts: Limouzin 7		Pts: Leimane 2

Cracovia Arena, Kraków

21 June 2023
14:55

Boxscore

Hungary	15–21	Czechia
Pts: Bach, Jáhni 5		Pts: Galíčková 9

Cracovia Arena, Kraków

21 June 2023
16:20

Boxscore

Latvia	12–18	Czechia
Pts: Leimane 5		Pts: Galíčková 10

Cracovia Arena, Kraków

21 June 2023
16:45

Boxscore

France	22–8	Hungary
Pts: Mané 11		Pts: Bach 5

Cracovia Arena, Kraków

23 June 2023
20:20

Boxscore

Hungary	20–8	Latvia
Pts: Bach 6		Pts: Korzāne, Mauriņa 3

Cracovia Arena, Kraków

23 June 2023
20:45

Boxscore

Czechia	9–14	France
Pts: Motyčáková 5		Pts: Ngo Ndjock 5

Cracovia Arena, Kraków

=== Pool B ===
Pos	Team	Pld	W	L	PF	Qualification
1	Romania	3	3	0	47	Quarterfinals
2	Austria	3	2	1	49	Quarterfinals
3	Germany	3	1	2	47	
4	Greece	3	0	3	32	

Source: EG2023
Rules for classification: 1) Wins; 2) Head-to-head record; 3) Points scored.

21 June 2023
09:30

Boxscore

Greece	12–17	Germany
Pts: Tsineke 7		Pts: Reichert 9

Cracovia Arena, Kraków

21 June 2023
09:55

Boxscore

Romania	17–14	Austria
Pts: Kim 12		Pts: Kalaydjiev 7

Cracovia Arena, Kraków

21 June 2023
11:20

Boxscore

Greece	8–15	Austria
Pts: Stoupa 6		Pts: Kalaydjiev 6

Cracovia Arena, Kraków

21 June 2023
11:45

Boxscore

Germany	13–15	Romania
Pts: Reichert 6		Pts: Kim 9

Cracovia Arena, Kraków

23 June 2023
13:30

Boxscore

Romania	15–12	Greece
Pts: Kim, Vîrjoghe 6		Pts: Anastasopoulou, Mylonaki 4

Cracovia Arena, Kraków

23 June 2023
13:55

Boxscore

Austria	20–17	Germany
Pts: Neumann 8		Pts: Reichert, Poros 7

Cracovia Arena, Kraków

=== Pool C ===
Pos	Team	Pld	W	L	PF	Qualification
1	Lithuania	3	3	0	62	Quarterfinals
2	Poland (H)	3	1 (Note: Poland 1–1, Ukraine 1–1, Estonia 1–1, ranked by points scored.)	2	51	Quarterfinals
3	Ukraine	3	1	2	46	
4	Estonia	3	1	2	45	

Source: EG2023
Rules for classification: 1) Wins; 2) Head-to-head record; 3) Points scored.
(H) Host
Notes:

22 June 2023
18:30

Boxscore

Poland	16–19	Ukraine
Pts: Morawiec 6		Pts: Uro-Nilie 8

Cracovia Arena, Kraków

22 June 2023
18:55

Boxscore

Lithuania	21–16	Estonia
Pts: Nacickaitė 9		Pts: Kosareva 5

Cracovia Arena, Kraków

22 June 2023
20:20

Boxscore

Estonia	14–13	Ukraine
Pts: Sepp 9		Pts: Uro-Nilie 6

Cracovia Arena, Kraków

22 June 2023
20:45

Boxscore

Lithuania	20–19	Poland
Pts: Nacickaitė 12		Pts: Morawiec 7

Cracovia Arena, Kraków

23 June 2023
18:30

Boxscore

Poland	16–15	Estonia
Pts: Marcinkowska, Morawiec 5		Pts: Lass, Sepp 5

Cracovia Arena, Kraków

23 June 2023
18:55

Boxscore

Ukraine	14–21	Lithuania
Pts: Mollova, Uro-Nilie 6		Pts: Nacickaitė 8

Cracovia Arena, Kraków

=== Pool D ===
Pos	Team	Pld	W	L	PF	Qualification
1	Spain	3	3	0	64	Quarterfinals
2	Israel	3	1 (Note: Israel 1–1, Netherlands 1–1, Switzerland 1–1, ranked by points scored.)	2	49	Quarterfinals
3	Netherlands	3	1	2	47	
4	Switzerland	3	1	2	43	

Source: EG2023
Rules for classification: 1) Wins; 2) Head-to-head record; 3) Points scored.
Notes:

22 June 2023
13:30

Boxscore

Netherlands	20–14	Switzerland
Pts: Hayford, Klerx 7		Pts: Loosa 7

Cracovia Arena, Kraków

22 June 2023
13:55

Boxscore

Spain	21–12	Israel
Pts: Muhate, Oma 7		Pts: Nesher 8

Cracovia Arena, Kraków

22 June 2023
15:20

Boxscore

Switzerland	20–17 (OT)	Israel
Pts: Jacquot 9		Pts: Kayuf 9

Cracovia Arena, Kraków

22 June 2023
15:45

Boxscore

Netherlands	8–21	Spain
Pts: Klerx 4		Pts: Muhate, Oma 7

Cracovia Arena, Kraków

23 June 2023
15:20

Boxscore

Spain	22–9	Switzerland
Pts: Prieto 9		Pts: Jacquot 5

Cracovia Arena, Kraków

23 June 2023
15:45

Boxscore

Israel	20–19	Netherlands
Pts: Kesten Raz, Nesher 8		Pts: Boonstra 8

Cracovia Arena, Kraków

== Knockout round ==
=== Bracket ===
Quarterfinals
24 June
France	19
Poland	10
24 June
Spain	19
Austria	16
24 June
Romania	21
Israel	11
24 June
Lithuania	21
Czechia	7

Semifinals
24 June
France	20
Spain	11
24 June
Romania	13
Lithuania	16

Final
24 June
France	16
Lithuania	19
Third place
24 June
Spain	21
Romania	15

=== Quarterfinals ===
24 June 2023
13:30

Boxscore

France	19–10	Poland
Pts: Mané 8		Pts: Morawiec 6

Cracovia Arena, Kraków

24 June 2023
13:55

Boxscore

Spain	19–16	Austria
Pts: Oma 8		Pts: Kalaydjiev 7

Cracovia Arena, Kraków

24 June 2023
15:20

Boxscore

Romania	21–11	Israel
Pts: Kim 11		Pts: Kesten Raz 5

Cracovia Arena, Kraków

24 June 2023
15:45

Boxscore

Lithuania	21–7	Czechia
Pts: Nacickaitė 9		Pts: Galíčková, Levínská 3

Cracovia Arena, Kraków

=== Semifinals ===
24 June 2023
18:30

Boxscore

France	20–11	Spain
Pts: Djekoundade 8		Pts: Oma 4

Cracovia Arena, Kraków

24 June 2023
18:55

Boxscore

Romania	13–16	Lithuania
Pts: Kim 8		Pts: Nacickaitė 6

Cracovia Arena, Kraków

=== Bronze medal game ===
24 June 2023
20:20

Boxscore

Spain	21–15	Romania
Pts: Oma 9		Pts: Kim, Podar 7

Cracovia Arena, Kraków

=== Final ===
24 June 2023
21:10

Boxscore

France	16–19	Lithuania
Pts: Limouzin 8		Pts: Nacickaitė 8

Cracovia Arena, Kraków

== See also ==
- Basketball at the 2023 European Games – Men's tournament
