= 3x3 basketball at the 2023 European Games =

- Venue: Cracovia Arena, Kraków
- Dates: 21–24 June
- Competitors: 128 from 19 nations

Basketball competitions at the 2023 European Games were held from 21 to 24 June 2023 at the Cracovia Arena in Kraków. The competition once more took place in the half-court 3x3 format, and both the men's and women's tournaments featured sixteen teams. Each qualifying team consisted of four players, of whom three could appear on court at any one time. A full schedule and groups were released on 15 June 2023.

== Qualification ==
A NOC may enter one men's team with four players and one women's team with four players. The top sixteen teams at the FIBA 3x3 Federation World Ranking qualify in each tournament.

=== Qualified teams ===
Qualified as	Date	Men	Women
FIBA 3x3 Federation Ranking	1 November 2022	Serbia; Lithuania; Netherlands; Latvia; Belgium; France; Switzerland; Germany; Poland; Austria; Israel; Slovenia; Spain; Czech Republic; Romania; Estonia	France; Germany; Lithuania; Netherlands; Spain; Poland; Romania; Hungary; Czech Republic; Israel; Switzerland; Austria; Ukraine; Estonia; Greece; Latvia
Total		16	16

== Medal summary ==
Event	Gold	Silver	Bronze
Men	Latvia; Kārlis Apsītis; Kristaps Gludītis; Francis Lācis; Zigmārs Raimo	Belgium; Caspar Augustijnen; Bryan De Valck; Dennis Donkor; Thibaut Vervoort	Poland; Adrian Bogucki; Szymon Rduch; Mateusz Szlachetka; Przemysław Zamojski
Women	Lithuania; Giedrė Labuckienė; Kamilė Nacickaitė; Martyna Petrėnaitė; Gabrielė Šulskė	France; Myriam Djekoundade; Hortense Limouzin; Marie Mané; Anna Ngo Ndjock	Spain; Cecilia Muhate; Helena Oma; Alba Prieto; Natalia Rodríguez

== Paris 2024 qualification ==
There was no direct qualification to the 2024 Summer Olympic tournament from the European Games. As a FIBA 3x3 Recognised National Team Competition, the European Games 2023 awarded ranking points counted towards the 3x3 Federation Ranking list for Paris 2024 qualification.
