= Lithuania at the 2023 European Games =

- IOC code: LTU
- NOC: Lithuanian National Olympic Committee
- Website: www.ltok.lt

in Kraków and Małopolska, Poland 21 June – 2 July 2023
- Competitors: 131 in 20 sports
- Flag bearers: Henrikas Žustautas and Kamilė Nacickaitė (opening); Ieva Serapinaitė (closing)
- Medals Ranked 29thth: Gold 2 Silver 2 Bronze 4 Total 8

European Games appearances (overview)
- 2015; 2019; 2023; 2027

Lithuania competed at the 2023 European Games, in Kraków and Małopolska, Poland, from 21 June to 2 July 2023.

== Medalists ==
Medal	Name	Sport	Event	Date
Gold	Henrikas Žustautas	Canoe sprint	Men's C1-200m	23 June
Gold	Giedrė Labuckienė; Martyna Petrėnaitė; Kamilė Nacickaitė; Gabrielė Šulskė	Basketball	Women's 3x3	24 June
Silver	Edis Matusevičius	Athletics	Men's Javelin Throw	25 June
Silver	Laura Asadauskaitė; Gintarė Venčkauskaitė; Ieva Serapinaitė	Modern pentathlon	Women's Team	1 July
Bronze	Andrius Gudžius	Athletics	Men's Discus Throw	24 June
Bronze	Greta Karinauskaitė	Athletics	Women's 3000 m steeplechase	25 June
Bronze	Gabija Galvydytė	Athletics	Women's 1500m	25 June
Bronze	Dominika Banevič	Breakdancing	B-Girls	27 June

== Competitors ==
Team Lithuania have selected a squad of 131 athletes to compete in the Kraków-Małopolska 2023 European Games

Sport	Men	Women	Total
Archery	1	1	2
Athletics	21	22	43
Badminton	0	1	1
Basketball (3x3)	4	4	8
Boxing	5	3	8
Breakdancing	0	1	1
Canoe Slalom	3	0	3
Canoe Sprint	7	1	8
Cycling - BMX	2	0	2
Cycling - MTB	2	0	2
Diving	1	2	3
Fencing	2	5	7
Judo	4	5	9
Modern Pentathlon	4	4	8
Padel tennis	2	2	4
Rugby Sevens	13	0	13
Shooting	1	1	2
Table Tennis	0	1	1
Taekwondo	0	2	2
Teqball	1	0	1
Triathlon	2	1	3
Total	75	56	131

== Archery ==
Men

Athlete	Event	Ranking round		Round of 64	Round of 32	Round of 16	Quarterfinal	Semi-final	Final / BM	
Athlete	Event	Score	Seed	Opposition Score	Opposition Score	Opposition Score	Opposition Score	Opposition Score	Opposition Score	Rank
Jonas Grigaravičius	Individual compound	699	14	—	—	—	(France) Girard; L 144-147	did not advance		

Women

Athlete	Event	Ranking round		Round of 64	Round of 32	Round of 16	Quarterfinal	Semi-final	Final / BM	
Athlete	Event	Score	Seed	Opposition Result	Opposition Result	Opposition Result	Opposition Result	Opposition Result	Opposition Result	Rank
Paulina Ramanauskaitė	Individual recurve	600	42	—	(Azerbaijan) Ramazanova; W 6-5	(France) Lopez; L 4-6	did not advance			

== Athletics ==
Lithuania is set to compete in the second division of the 2023 European Athletics Team Championships which is going to be held in Chorzów during the Games.

=== European Athletics Team Championships Second Division ===
Team	Event		Event points																			Total	Rank
Team	Event		100m	200m	400m	800m	1500m	5000m	110m h*	400m h	3000m SC	4 × 100 m	4 × 400 m**	SP	JT	HT	DT	PV	HJ	TJ	LJ	Total	Rank
Lithuania	Team Championships Second Division	Men	4	15	11	9	13	7	5	12	6	8	13	6	16	9	15	6	11.5	6	15	372.5	3
Lithuania	Team Championships Second Division	Women	8	6	15	13	14	5	3	7	15	14	13	12	11	8	15	0	13	13	14	372.5	3

key: h: hurdles; SC; Steeplechase: SP; Shot put: JT: Javelin: HT: Hammer: DT: Discus: PV: Pole vault: HJ: High jump: TJ: Triple Jump: LJ: Long Jump

- Women compete at 100 metre hurdles, rather than 110 metre hurdles.
- 4 x 400 metres is held as a single mixed sex event

=== Individual events at the 2023 European Games ===
As a participant in the Team event, each nation automatically enters one athlete in each of the individual events.

Individual

Event	Male Athlete	Score	Match position	Overall ranking	Female athlete	Score	Match position	Overall ranking
100 m	Kristupas Seikauskas	10.72	13	33	Eva Misiūnaitė	11.68 SB	9	26
200 m	Gediminas Truskauskas	20.60 SB	2	4	Lukrecija Sabaitytė	23.71	11	26
400 m	Tomas Keršulis	46.36	7	20	Modesta Morauskaitė	51.61 SB	2	9
800 m	Simas Bertašius	1:49.55 SB	8	23	Gabija Galvydytė	2:00.29 SB	4	5
1500 m	Simas Bertašius	3:43.01	4	16	Gabija Galvydytė	4:09.48 SB	3	Bronze
5000 m	Giedrius Valinčius	14:13.93	10	21	Lina Kiriliuk	17:12.49	12	30
110/100 m h	Edgaras Benkunskas	14.49	12	28	Gabija Klimukaitė	14.10	14	31
400m h	Rapolas Saulius	51.64 SB	5	22	Ema Sarafinaitė	1:01.37 SB	10	29
3000m SC	Giedrius Valinčius	9:05.05	11	30	Greta Karinauskaitė	9:28.48	2	Bronze
Shot put	Šarūnas Banevičius	16.93	11	31	Urtė Bačianskaitė	14.81	5	22
Javelin	Edis Matusevičius	84.22 SB	1	Silver	Liveta Jasiūnaitė	57.46	6	12
Hammer	Tomas Vasiliauskas	68.73	8	19	Agnė Lukoševičiūtė	60.73	9	24
Discus	Andrius Gudžius	64.94	2	Bronze	Ieva Zarankaitė	57.71	2	7
Pole vault	Nikodemas Laurynas	4.70	11	30	Rugilė Miklyčiūtė	NM	-	-
High jump	Juozas Baikštys	2.15	5	11	Airinė Palšytė	1.91 SB	4	6
Triple Jump	Gustas Griška	14.92	11	26	Aina Grikšaitė	13.53	4	11
Long Jump	Marius Vadeikis	7.80 SB	2	6	Jogailė Petrokaitė	6.60 SB	3	5

Relays

Event	Athletes	Score	Match position	Overall ranking
Men's 4 × 100 m	Kristupas Seikauskas; Tomas Keršulis; Kostas Skrabulis; Gediminas Truskauskas	40.10 SB	9	23
Women's 4 × 100 m	Andrė Ožechauskaitė; Modesta Justė Morauskaitė; Eva Misiūnaitė; Lukrecija Sabaitytė	44.06 SB	3	11
Mixed 4 × 400 m	Lukas Sutkus; Ema Sarafinaitė; Tomas Keršulis; Modesta Justė Morauskaitė	3:15.95 NR	4	14

== Badminton ==
The draw was made on 6 June by Badminton Europe and Broadcast on Facebook.

Athlete	Event	Group stage				Round of 16	Quarterfinal	Semi-final	Final	
Athlete	Event	Opposition Score	Opposition Score	Opposition Score	Rank	Opposition Score	Opposition Score	Opposition Score	Opposition Score	Rank
Samanta Golubickaitė	Women's singles	Li (GER); L 0-2	Azzahra (AZE); L 0-2	Ginga (MDA); W 2-1	3	did not advance				

== Basketball ==
Team	Event	Group stage				Quarterfinals	Semifinals	Final / BM	
Team	Event	Opposition Score	Opposition Score	Opposition Score	Rank	Opposition Score	Opposition Score	Opposition Score	Rank
Ignas Razutis; Ignas Vaitkus; Vytautas Šulskis; Deividas Rasys	Men's tournament	Romania; W 22–13	Austria; L 18–22	Switzerland; W 22–18	2 Q	Latvia; L 18–22	did not advance		

Team	Event	Group stage				Quarterfinals	Semifinals	Final / BM	
Team	Event	Opposition Score	Opposition Score	Opposition Score	Rank	Opposition Score	Opposition Score	Opposition Score	Rank
Giedrė Labuckienė; Martyna Petrėnaitė; Kamilė Nacickaitė; Gabrielė Šulskė	Women's tournament	Estonia; W 21–16	Poland; W 20–19	Ukraine; W 21–14	1 Q	Czech Republic; W 21–7	Romania; W 16–13	France; W 19–16	Gold

== Boxing ==
Men

Athlete	Event	Round of 32	Round of 16	Quarterfinal	Semi-final	Final	
Athlete	Event	Opposition Result	Opposition Result	Opposition Result	Opposition Result	Opposition Result	Rank
Andriejus Lavrenovas	Light welterweight (63 kg)	(Hungary) Kovacs; L 0:5	did not advance				
Aleksandr Trofimčiuk	Light middleweight (71 kg)	(Austria) Avdic; W 4:1	(Albania) Beqiri; L 1:4	did not advance			
Robertas Liorančas	Light heavyweight (80 kg)	(Moldova) Chiriacov; W 5:0	(Netherlands) Kraus; W/O	withdrew			
Simonas Urbonavičius	Heavyweight (92 kg)	—	(Croatia) Čalić; L 0:5	did not advance			
Jonas Jazevičius	Super heavyweight (92+ kg)	(Poland) Kawczak; W 4:1	(Kosovo) Shabani; W RSC R1	(Bulgaria) Hernandez Morejon; L 0:5	did not advance		

Women

Athlete	Event	Round of 32	Round of 16	Quarterfinal	Semi-final	Final	
Athlete	Event	Opposition Result	Opposition Result	Opposition Result	Opposition Result	Opposition Result	Rank
Ana Starovoitova	60 kg	—	(Turkey) Ozer; L 0:4	did not advance			
Austėja Aučiūtė	66 kg	(Turkey) Surmeneli; L 0:5	did not advance				
Gabrielė Stonkutė	75 kg	—	(Turkey) Isildar; L 2:3	did not advance			

== Breakdancing ==
Individual

Athlete	Event	Group Stage		Quarterfinals	Semi-finals	Final	
Athlete	Event	Opposition Score	Opposition Score	Opposition Score	Opposition Score	Opposition Score	Rank
Dominika Banevič (B-Girl Nicka)	Women's Individual	(Belgium) Madmax; W 2-0	(Germany) Jilou; W 2-0	(France) Syssy; W 2-0	(Ukraine) Stefani; L 1-2	(Italy) Anti; W 2-1	Bronze

== Canoe Sprint ==
Athlete	Event	Heats		Semifinal		Final		Ranking
Athlete	Event	Time	Place	Time	Place	Time	Place	Ranking
Andrej Olijnik	Men's K1-500m	1:43.735	3 SF	1:40.367	5 FB	1:40.359	5	14
Andrej Olijnik; Mindaugas Maldonis	Men's K2-500m	1:30.377	1 FA	—	—	1:41.573	7	7
Artūras Seja; Ignas Navakauskas; Mindaugas Maldonis; Simonas Maldonis	Men's K4-500m	1:21.516	3 F	—	—	1:21.778	9	9
Henrikas Žustautas	Men's C1-200m	39.712	2 F	—	—	39.700	1	Gold
Henrikas Žustautas	Men's C1-500m	1:55.204	6 SF	1:52.649	5	did not advance		11
Henrikas Žustautas; Vadim Korobov	Men's C2-500m	1:41.160	3 F	—	—	1:41.573	7	7
Gabrielė Čerepokaitė	Women's C1-200m	50.652	7 SF	52.092	8	did not advance		14
Gabrielė Čerepokaitė; Vadim Korobov	Mixed C2-200m	43.857	5 SF	did not started				

== Canoe Slalom ==
Athlete	Event	Preliminary				Semi-final		Final	
Athlete	Event	Run 1	Rank	Run 2	Rank	Time	Rank	Time	Rank
Rimantas Pumputis	Men's K-1	DNS	-	did not advance					
Mantas Atmanavičius	Men's K-1	114.43	55	113.00	17	did not advance			
Vilius Rasimavičius	Men's K-1	114.82	56	112.66	16	did not advance			
Rimantas Pumputis	Men's C-1	150.86	42	135.92	22	did not advance			

== Cycling ==
=== Mountain Bike ===
Men

Athlete	Event	Time	Rank
Ignas Ambrazas	Men's cross country	LAP	-
Šarūnas Pacevičius	Men's cross country	LAP	-

=== BMX freestyle ===
Men

Athlete	Event	Seeding				Final		
Athlete	Event	Run 1	Run 2	Average	Rank	Run 1	Run 2	Rank
Deividas Budkovas	Men's Park	did not start				did not advance		
Martynas Lagauskas	Men's Park	37.66	38.00	37.83	26	did not advance		

== Diving ==
Men

Athlete	Event	Qualification		Final	
Athlete	Event	Points	Rank	Points	Rank
Martynas Lisauskas	3 m springboard	245.85	31	did not advance	
Martynas Lisauskas	1 m springboard	245.30	28	did not advance	

Women

Athlete	Event	Qualification		Final	
Athlete	Event	Points	Rank	Points	Rank
Vita Šlajūtė	1 m springboard	197.50	20	did not advance	
Urtė Valeišaitė	1 m springboard	159.05	25	did not advance	
Vita Šlajūtė; Urtė Valeišaitė	Synchronized 3 m springboard	—		214.47	8

== Fencing ==
Men's

Athlete	Event	Preliminaries		Round of 64	Round of 32	Round of 16	Quarterfinals	Semifinals	Final / BM	
Athlete	Event	V/B	Rank	Opposition Score	Opposition Score	Opposition Score	Opposition Score	Opposition Score	Opposition Score	Rank
Leonardas Kalininas	Épée	1V	84	did not advance						
Mindaugas Tamošiūnas	Épée	2V	73	did not advance						

Women's

Athlete	Event	Preliminaries		Round of 64	Round of 32	Round of 16	Quarterfinals	Semifinals	Final / BM	
Athlete	Event	V/B	Rank	Opposition Score	Opposition Score	Opposition Score	Opposition Score	Opposition Score	Opposition Score	Rank
Paulina Bajorūnaitė-Stauskė	Épée	2V	51 Q	(Hungary) Kun; L 7-15	did not advance					
Olivija Mašalo	Épée	3V	45 Q	(Spain) Garcia Rodriguez; L 10-15	did not advance					
Viktė Ažukaitė	Épée	1V	65	did not advance						
Lurdė Grabovskytė	Épée	1V	63	did not advance						
Lurdė Grabovskytė; Olivija Mašalo; Paulina Bajorūnaitė-Stauskė; Viktė Ažukaitė	Team épée	—				Belgium; W 45-35	France; L 17-45	For 9th-16th place: Romania L 36-45; Czech Republic L 36-45; Finland L 33-45	did not advance	16
Giedrė Razgutė	Sabre	0V	53	did not advance						

== Judo ==
Athlete	Category	Round of 32	Round of 16	Quarterfinals	Semifinals	Final	
Athlete	Category	Opposition Result	Opposition Result	Opposition Result	Opposition Result	Opposition Result	Rank
Miglė Dudėnaitė; Sandra Jablonskytė; Ugnė Pileckaitė; Vaiga Čečytė; Aida Vasiliauskaitė; Augustas Šlyteris; Ignas Mečajus; Kęstutis Vitkauskas; Kostas Butkus	Mixed team	Croatia; L 0-4	did not advance				

== Modern Pentathlon ==
Athlete	Event	Qualification		Semi-Final		Fencing (épée one touch)				Swimming (200 m freestyle)			Riding (show jumping)			Combined: shooting/running (10 m air pistol)/(3200 m)			Total points	Final rank
Athlete	Event	MP points	Rank	MP points	Rank	RR	BR	Rank	MP points	Time	Rank	MP points	Penalties	Rank	MP points	Time	Rank	MP Points	Total points	Final rank
Paulius Vagnorius	Men's	1078	26	did not advance																
Nojus Chmieliauskas	Men's	1106	30	did not advance																
Lukas Gaudiešius	Men's	1134	22	did not advance																
Titas Puronas	Men's	1147	22	did not advance																
Ieva Serapinaitė	Women's	1096	18 Q	1107	5 Q	19/16	2	8	224	2:12.04	4	286	-23	16	276	11:56.40	16	584	1371	15
Elzbieta Adomaitytė	Women's	1070	10 Q	1069	18	did not advance														
Gintarė Venčkauskaitė	Women's	1074	7 Q	1123	2 Q	18/17	0	12	215	2:19.44	12	274	-24	16	276	10:54.40	2	646	1411	9
Laura Asadauskaitė-Zadneprovskienė	Women's	1107	2 Q	1109	4 Q	17/18	0	15	210	2:21.86	16	267	-7	9	293	10:50.10	1	650	1420	4
Nojus Chmieliauskas; Lukas Gaudiešius; Titas Puronas	Men's team	—																	3387	12
Ieva Serapinaitė; Gintarė Venčkauskaitė; Laura Asadauskaitė	Women's team	—																	4202	Silver

== Padel ==
Athletes	Event	Round of 32	Round of 16	Quarterfinal	Semi-final	Final	
Athletes	Event	Opposition Result	Opposition Result	Opposition Result	Opposition Result	Opposition Result	Rank
Skirmantas Mačinskas; Nojus Poška	Men's Doubles	Gala; Santiagosa (ESP); L 0-2	did not advance				
Auksė Mačiulaitytė; Ieva Čeilutkaitė	Women's Doubles	Kristiansen/ Frogner (NOR); W 2-0	Barrera; Caparros (ESP); L 0-2	did not advance			

== Rugby sevens ==
Athletes	Event	Group stage				Quarter-final	Semi-final	Final	Rank
Athletes	Event	Opponent Score	Opponent Score	Opponent Score	Rank	Opponent Score	Opponent Score	Opponent Score	Rank
Martynas Lianzbergas; Kęstutis Karbauskas; Arnas Prielaidas; Armandas Kalinauskas; Tautvydas Krasauskas; Donatas Vilimavičius; Domantas Bagužis; Ignas Jankaitis; Vytaras Bloškys; Arnas Urbonas; Dovydas Taujanskas; Deividas Krečius; Mantas Butkevičius	Men's	Portugal; L 12-38	Great Britain; L 0-24	Romania; W 24-10	3	did not advance	For 9th-12th place: Poland; W 33-10	For 9th-10th place: Czech Republic; W 24-19	9

== Shooting ==
Men

Athlete	Event	Qualification		Final	
Athlete	Event	Points	Rank	Points	Rank
Karolis Girulis	10 m air rifle	624.9	30	did not advance	
Karolis Girulis	50 m rifle 3 positions	577	32	did not advance	

Women

Athlete	Event	Qualification		Final	
Athlete	Event	Points	Rank	Points	Rank
Jekaterina Ždanova	25 m pistol	566	29	did not advance	

== Table Tennis ==
Athlete	Event	Round 1	Round 2	Round 3	Round 4	Quarterfinal	Semi-final	Final / BM	
Athlete	Event	Opposition Result	Opposition Result	Opposition Result	Opposition Result	Opposition Result	Opposition Result	Opposition Result	Rank
Kornelija Riliškytė	Women's singles	(Georgia (country)) Nikoiani; W 4-3	(Italy) Vivarelli; W 4-0	(France) Yuan; L 0-4	did not advance				

== Taekwondo ==
Women

Athlete	Event	Round of 16	Quarterfinal	Semi-final	Final	
Athlete	Event	Opposition Result	Opposition Result	Opposition Result	Opposition Result	Rank
Gerda Meištininkaitė	53 kg	(Israel) Lager; L 1-2	did not advance			
Klaudija Tvaronavičiūtė	57 kg	(Austria) Kindl; W 2-1	(Turkey) Ilgun; L 0-2	did not advance		

== Teqball ==
Athlete	Event	Group stage		Quarterfinal	Semi-final	Final
Athlete	Event	Opponent Score	Opponent Score	Opponent Score	Opponent Score	Opponent Score
Kęstutis Balčiūnas	Men's singles	(North Macedonia) Pejchinovski; W 2-1	(Poland) Duszak; L 0-2	did not advance		

== Triathlon ==
Athlete	Event	Swim (1.5 km)	Trans 1	Bike (40 km)	Trans 2	Run (10 km)	Total time	Rank
Igoris Kozlovskis	Men's triathlon	Lapped						
Lukas Prokopavičius	Men's triathlon	Lapped						
Unė Narkūnaitė	Women's triathlon	Lapped						
