= 2024–25 Ukrainian Women's Basketball SuperLeague =

Women's basketball league in Ukraine

Ukrainian Women's Basketball SuperLeague
- Season: 2024–25
- Dates: Regular season: 12 October 2024 – 11 April 2025; Play Offs: 15–30 April 2025
- Teams: 4

Regular season
- Season MVP: (Poland) Oksana Mollova

Finals
- Champions: Frankivsk-Prykarpattya (3rd title)
- Runners-up: InterChem-Sdyusshor
- Finals MVP: (Poland) Oksana Mollova

Statistical leaders
Points	(Ukraine) Krystyna Filevych	15.6
Rebounds	(Ukraine) Krystyna Filevych	11.9
Assists	two players	4.9
Steals	(Ukraine) Yuliia Musiienko	2.8
Blocks	(Ukraine) Iryna Bugayova	1.1

The 2024–25 Ukrainian Women's Basketball SuperLeague is the 34th season of the top division women's basketball league in Ukraine since its establishment in 1991. It starts in October 2024 with the first round of the regular season and ends in April 2025.

Frankivsk-Prykarpattya are the defending champions.

Frankivsk-Prykarpattya won their third title after beating InterChem-Sdyusshor in the final.

== Format ==
Each team plays each other six times. Every team qualifies for the play offs. The semifinals and final are played as a best of three series.

== Regular season ==
Pos	Team	Pld	W	L	PF	PA	PD	Pts	Qualification
1	Frankivsk-Prykarpattya	18	15	3	1370	1052	+318	33	Play Offs
2	InterChem-Sdyusshor	18	11	7	1228	1117	+111	29	Play Offs
3	Kyiv-Basket	18	6	12	1165	1189	−24	24	Play Offs
4	Vinnytsia-Medical University	18	4	14	1091	1496	−405	22	Play Offs

Source: Ukrainian Women's Basketball SuperLeague
Rules for classification: 1) Points; 2) Points difference; 3) Points scored.

== Play offs ==
Semifinals
1	Frankivsk-Prykarpattya	89	87	2
4	Vinnytsia-Medical University	59	51	0
2	InterChem-Sdyusshor	46	69	66	2
3	Kyiv-Basket	55	55	63	1

Final
1	Frankivsk-Prykarpattya	82	62	2
2	InterChem-Sdyusshor	56	52	0
Third place
3	Kyiv-Basket	84	82	2
4	Vinnytsia-Medical University	61	44	0

Champions of Ukraine

Frankivsk-Prykarpattya
Third title
