= Kilometre Pole =

Monument in Warsaw, Poland

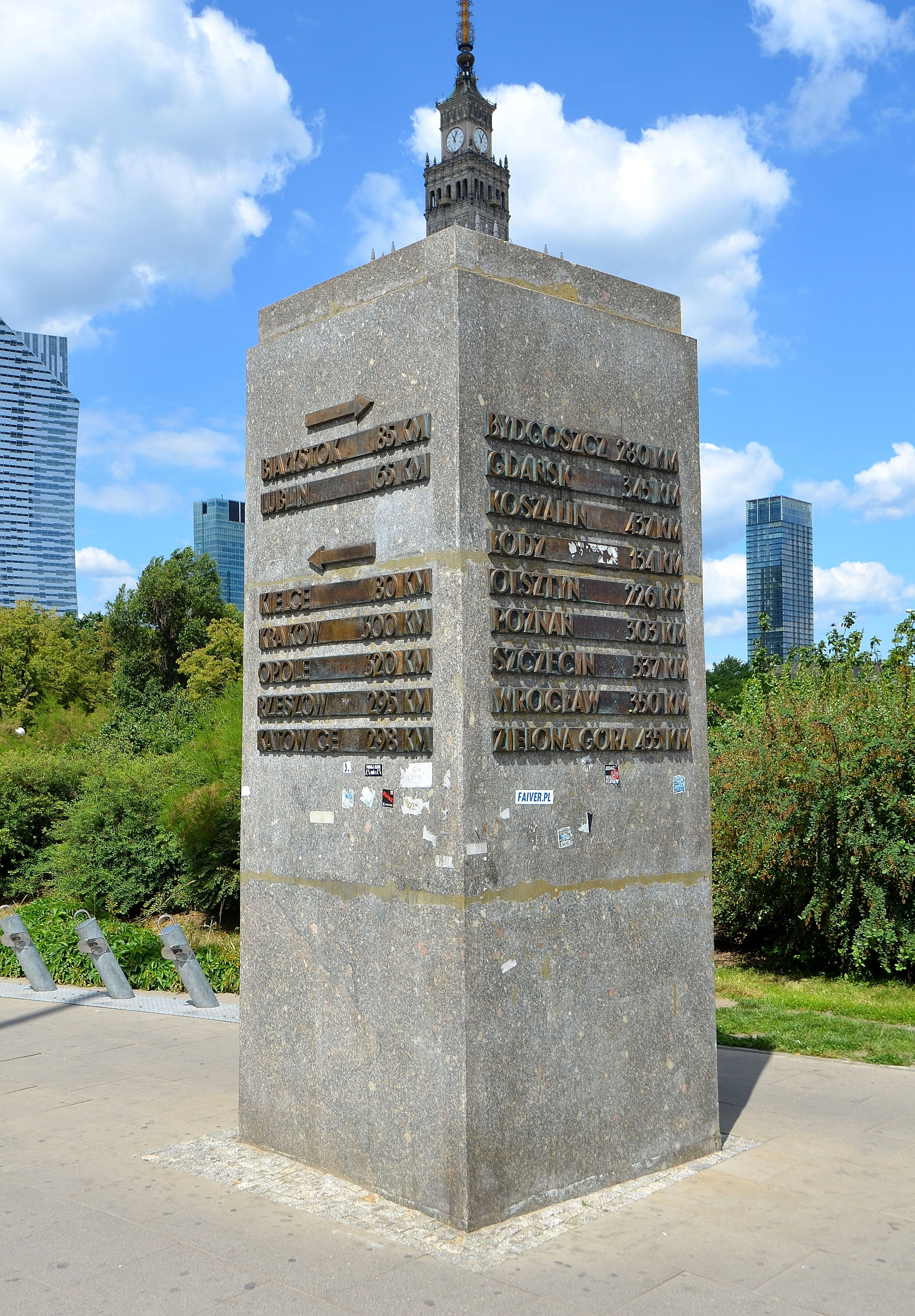
- The southeastern side of the monument in 2014.
- Interactive map of Kilometre Pole
- Location: Dmowski Roundabout, Downtown, Warsaw, Poland
- Coordinates: 52°13′48″N 21°00′40″E
- Type: Monument
- Material: Granite
- Length: 1.5 m (4 ft 11 in)
- Width: 1.5 m (4 ft 11 in)
- Height: 2.5 m (8 ft 2 in)
- Completion date: 1952–1955

The Kilometre Pole (Polish: Słup kilometrowy) is a structure in Warsaw, Poland, denoting the national kilometre zero, used to calculate distances on road signs. It is placed at the Parade Square, next to the Dmowski Roundabout at the intersection of Jerusalem Avenue and Marshal Street, within the neighbourhood of South Downtown. The monument takes a form of a granite cuboid with the heigh of 2.5 m, with a square base with wight of 1.5 m. The monument denotes the national kilometre zero, used to calculate distances on road signs. Its side walls are decorated with inscriptions, denoting the distances to the capital cities of various European countries and the contemporary voivodeships of Poland in the 1950s. The monument was placed at its location sometime between 1952 and 1955 during the development of the Parade Square.

== History ==
The structure was placed next to the intersection of Jerusalem Avenue and Marshal Street, during the construction of the Parade Square. It was used to denote the national kilometre zero, used to calculate distances on road signs. It was made from granite blocks, and decorated with Its side walls are decorated with inscriptions, denoting the distances to the capital cities of various European countries and the contemporary voivodeships of Poland in the 1950s. It was designed to evoke the style of the historic road signs in Poland. In April 1971, following the opening of the Dmowski Roundabout at the road intersection, the structure was moved several metres closer to it.

== Characteristics ==
The structure has a form of a tall cuboid, with the heigh of 2.5 m, with a square base with wight of 1.5 m. It is placed at the Parade Square, next to the Dmowski Roundabout at the intersection of Jerusalem Avenue and Marshal Street. It is made from polished granite blocks. It denotes the national kilometre zero, used to calculate distances on road signs. Its side walls are decorated with inscriptions, denoting the distances to the capital cities of various European countries and the contemporary voivodeships of Poland in the 1950s. Its design is meant to evoke the style of the historic road signs in Poland.

Northern wall; cities to the east
City		Country	Distance		Notes
English name	Polish name	Country	Km	Miles	Notes
Moscow	Moskwa	Russia	1,122	697.18	Capital of Russia

Northern wall; cities to the west
City		Country	Distance		Notes
English name	Polish name	Country	Km	Miles	Notes
Berlin	Berlin	Germany	518	321.87	Capital of Germany
Bern	Berno	Switzerland	1,126	699.66	Capital of Switzerland
Brussels	Bruksela	Belgium	1,122	697.18	Capital of Belgium
Dublin	Dublin	Ireland	1,824	1,133.38	Capital of Ireland
The Hague	Haga	Netherlands	1,138	707.12	Capital of the Netherlands
Lisbon	Lizbona	Portugal	2,633	1,636.07	Capital of Portugal
London	Londyn	United Kingdom	1,444	897.26	Capital of the United Kingdom
Luxembourg	Luksemburg	Luxembourg	1,080	671.08	Capital of Luxembourg
Madrid	Madryt	Spain	2,287	1,421.08	Capital of Spain
Paris	Paryż	France	1,365	848.17	Capital of France

Eastern wall
City	Country	Distance		Notes
City	Country	Km	Miles	Notes
Bydgoszcz	Poland	280	173.98	Former capital of the Bydgoszcz Voivodeship; current co-capital of the Kuyavian–Pomeranian Voivodeship
Gdańsk	Poland	345	214.37	Former capital of the Gdańsk Voivodeship; current capital of the Pomeranian Voivodeship
Koszalin	Poland	437	271.54	Former capital of the Koszalin Voivodeship
Łódź	Poland	134	83.26	Former capital of the Łódź Voivodeship; current capital of the Łódź Voivodeship
Olsztyn	Poland	226	140.43	Former capital of the Olsztyn Voivodeship; current capital of the Warmian–Masurian Voivodeship
Poznań	Poland	303	188.28	former capital of the Poznań Voivodeship; current capital of the Greater Poland Voivodeship
Szczecin	Poland	537	333.68	Former capital of the Szczecin Voivodeship; current capital of the West Pomeranian Voivodeship
Wrocław	Poland	350	217.48	Former capital of the Wrocław Voivodeship; current capital of the Lower Silesian Voivodeship
Zielona Góra	Poland	435	270.3	Former capital of the Zielona Góra Voivodeship; current co-capital of the Lubusz Voivodeship

Southern wall
City	Country	Distance		Notes			
City	Country	Białystok	Poland	Notes	185	114.95	Former capital of the Białystok Voivodeship
Lublin	Poland	165	102.52	Former capital of the Lublin Voivodeship; current capital of the Lublin Voivodeship			
Kielce	Poland	180	111.85	Former capital of the Kielce Voivodeship; current capital of the Holy Cross Voivodeship			
Kraków	Poland	300	186.41	Former capital of the Kraków Voivodeship; current capital of the Lesser Poland Voivodeship			
Opole	Poland	320	198.84	Former capital of the Opole Voivodeship; current capital of the Opole Voivodeship			
Rzeszów	Poland	295	183.3	Former capital of the Rzeszów Voivodeship; current capital of the Subcarpathian Voivodeship			
Katowice	Poland	298	185.17	Former capital of the Katowice Voivodeship; current capital of the Silesian Voivodeship			

Western wall; cities to the west
City		Country	Distance		Notes
English name	Polish name	Country	Km	Miles	Notes
Helsinki	Helsinki	Finland	945	587.2	Capital of Finland
Copenhagen	Kopenhaga	Denmark	647	402.03	Capital of Denmark
Oslo	Oslo	Norway	1,065	661.76	Capital of Norway
Reykjavík	Reykjawik	Iceland	2,771	1,721.82	Capital of Iceland
Stockholm	Sztokholm	Sweden	808	502.07	Capital of Sweden

Western wall; cities to the east
City		Country	Distance		Notes
English name	Polish name	Country	Km	Miles	Notes
Athens	Ateny	Greece	1,606	997.92	Capital of Greece
Belgrade	Belgrad	Serbia	826	513.25	Capital of Serbia
Budapest	Budapeszt	Hungary	545	338.64	Capital of Hungary
Bucharest	Bukareszt	Romania	948	589.06	Capital of Romania
Rome	Rzym	Italy	1,318	818.97	Capital of Italy
Sofia	Sofia	Bulgaria	1,073	666.73	Capital of Bulgaria
Prague	Praga	Czechia	518	321.87	Capital of Czechia
Tirana	Tirana	Albania	1,213	753.72	Capital of Albania
Vienna	Wiedeń	Austria	665	413.21	Capital of Austria
