= Ukrainian Women's Basketball SuperLeague =

Women's Basketball SuperLeague
- Current season, competition or edition: 2024–25 Ukrainian Women's Basketball SuperLeague
- Sport: Basketball
- Founded: 1991
- First season: 1991–92
- CEO: (Ukraine) Wołodymyr Ryżow
- No. of teams: 8
- Country: Ukraine
- Continent: Europe
- Most recent champions: Prometey Kamjanske (1st title)
- Most titles: Dynamo Kyiv, Kozachka-ZAlK Zaporizhzhia (9th title)
- Broadcaster: Biola
- Website: womenbasket.com.ua/

The Ukrainian Women's Basketball SuperLeague (Ukrainian: Жіноча Суперліга УПБЛ) is the top women's league of Ukrainian basketball. It was founded in 1992. It is run by the Basketball Federation of Ukraine (FBU). Before, the Ukrainian teams played in the championship of the USSR. During the seasons 1991/92-2009/10 called the Premier League (Ukrainian: Баскетбольна Вища ліга).

== Champions ==
Year	Gold	Silver	Bronze
1991–92	Dynamo Kyiv		
1992–93	Dynamo Kyiv		
1993–94	Dynamo Kyiv		Kozachka-ZAlK Zaporizhzhia
1994–95	Dynamo Kyiv		Kozachka-ZAlK Zaporizhzhia
1995–96	Dynamo Kyiv	Kozachka-ZAlK Zaporizhzhia	
1996–97	Kozachka-ZAlK Zaporizhzhia		
1997–98	Kozachka-ZAlK Zaporizhzhia	TIM-SKUF Kyiv	
1998–99	TIM-SKUF Kyiv	Kozachka-ZAlK Zaporizhzhia	
1999–00	TIM-SKUF Kyiv		
2000–01	Kozachka-ZAlK Zaporizhzhia		
2000–02	Kozachka-ZAlK Zaporizhzhia		
2002–03	Kozachka-ZAlK Zaporizhzhia	TIM-SKUF Kyiv	
2003–04	Kozachka-ZAlK Zaporizhzhia	TIM-SKUF Kyiv	
2004–05	Kozachka-ZAlK Zaporizhzhia	TIM-SKUF Kyiv	
2005–06	Kozachka-ZAlK Zaporizhzhia	Dnipro	TIM-SKUF Kyiv
2006–07	TIM-SKUF Kyiv		TIM-SKUF Kyiv
2007–08	Dnipro	TIM-SKUF Kyiv	Kozachka-ZAlK Zaporizhzhia
2008–09	Kozachka-ZAlK Zaporizhzhia	TIM-SKUF Kyiv	Chayka Berdyansk
2009–10	Dnipro	Dynamo-NPU Kyiv	Donbas Donetsk
2010–11	TIM-SKUF Kyiv	Rehina-Basket-Bar Bar	Dnipro-DVUFK
2011–12	Dynamo Kyiv	TIM-SKUF Kyiv	Rehina-Basket-Bar Bar
2012–13	Dynamo Kyiv	Elizabeth Basket	TIM-SKUF Kyiv
2013–14	Elizabeth Basket	TIM-SKUF Kyiv	Interchim Sdjoessjor Odesa
2014–15	Dynamo Kyiv	Interchim Sdjoessjor Odesa	Frankiwsk Iwano-Frankiwsk
2015–16	Interchim Sdjoessjor Odesa	Dynamo Kyiv	Winnyćki Błyskawky Winnycia
2016–17	TIM-SKUF Kyiv	Awanhard Kijów	Interchim Sdjoessjor Odesa
2017–18	Kyiv Basket	Interchim Sdjoessjor Odesa	Riwne-OSzWSM Równe
2018–19	Dynamo Kyiv	Kyiv Basket	Czajka Berdiańsk
2019–20	Interrupted due to the COVID-19 pandemic in Ukraine		
2019–20	Kyiv Basket	Dynamo Kyiv	Riwne-OSzWSM Równe
2020–21	Prometey Kamjanske		Dynamo Kyiv

== Performance by club ==
Adelynn

== See also ==
- Ukrainian Basketball League
