= Brianna Fraser (basketball) =

American-Azerbaijani basketball player (born 1994)

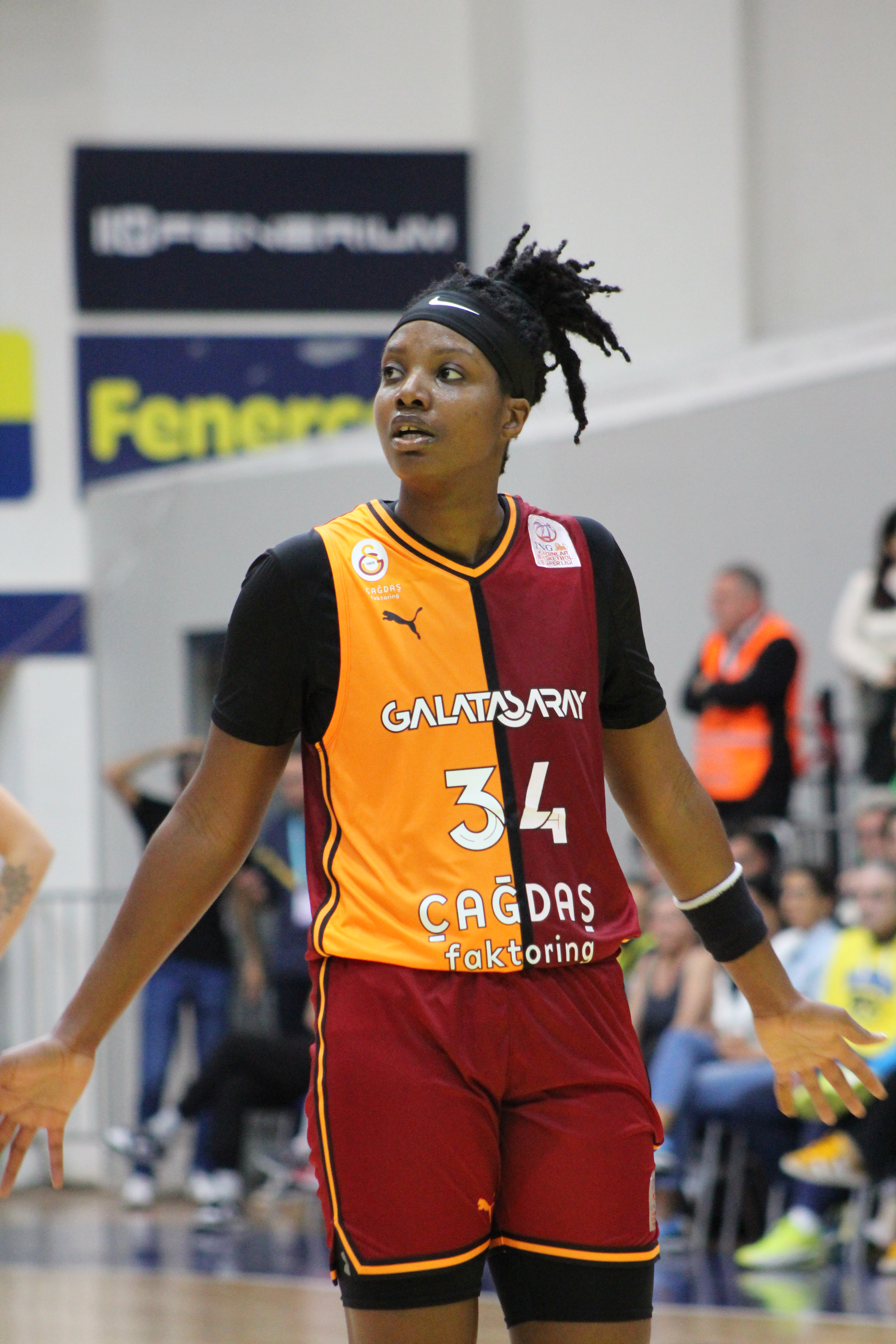
- Fraser in 2024

No. 34 – ZVVZ USK Praha
- Position: Power forward
- League: Czech League; EuroLeague Women

Personal information
- Born: May 22, 1997 (age 29) New York City, New York, U.S.
- Listed height: 6 ft 3 in (1.91 m)

Career information
- High school: South Shore (Brooklyn, New York)
- College: Maryland (2015–2019)
- WNBA draft: 2019: undrafted
- Playing career: 2019–present

Career history
- 2019–2021: Vasas
- 2021–2022: ACS Sepsi SIC
- 2022: Al Riyadi
- 2022–2023: Flammes Carolo Basket
- 2023–2024: CCC Polkowice
- 2024–2025: Galatasaray
- 2025: Casademont Zaragoza
- 2025: OGM Ormanspor
- 2026: Beşiktaş
- 2026–present: USK Praha
- Stats at Basketball Reference

Brianna Ashaki Fraser (born May 22, 1997) is an American-Azerbaijani professional basketball player who plays for USK Praha of the Czech Women's Basketball League.

== Early life ==
Fraser was born in New York City, New York on May 22, 1997, to Conwin and Linden Fraser. She attended South Shore High School in Brooklyn. She has one sister Brishana.

== College ==
Fraser played college basketball at the University of Maryland, where she averaged 6.9 points, 0.6 assists and 4.1 rebounds over four years. She started 3 of the 132 games she played.

== Career ==
On May 20, 2022, Fraser joined French side Flammes Carolo Basket. She averaged 16.6 points, 6.5 rebounds and 2.5 assists in the 2022–23 EuroCup Women.

On July 19, 2024, Fraser signed with Galatasaray.

On February 27, 2025, Casademont Zaragoza announced the signing of Fraser.

On December 26, 2025, Fraser joined Turkish side Beşiktaş.

On June 29, 2026, ZVVZ USK Praha announced the signing of Fraser.

== Career statistics ==
=== College ===
Year	Team	GP	Points	FG%	3P%	FT%	RPG	APG	SPG	BPG	PPG
2015–16	Maryland	32	128	.396	.250	.746	2.7	0.2	0.2	0.5	4.0
2016–17	Maryland	35	212	.519	.000	.675	3.6	0.5	0.3	0.8	6.1
2017–18	Maryland	33	336	.506	.000	.715	5.8	0.8	0.5	1.1	10.2
2018–19	Maryland	32	237	.497	.000	.613	4.1	0.7	0.5	0.5	7.4
Career		132	913	.490	.250	.689	4.1	0.6	0.4	0.7	6.9
