= Dina Ulyanova =

Azerbaijani basketball player (born 1989)

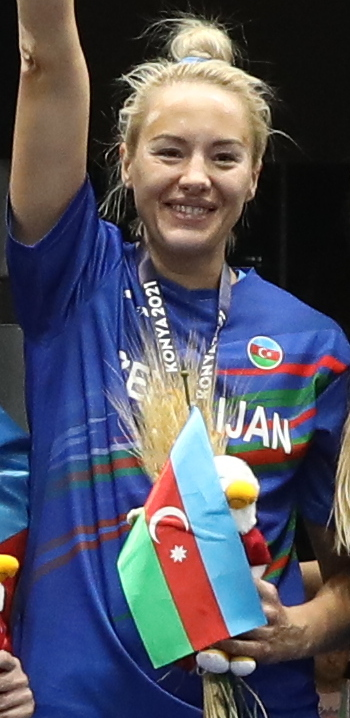
- Ulyanova at the 2021 Islamic Solidarity Games

Personal information
- Born: 1 September 1989 (age 37) Baku, Azerbaijan
- Listed height: 6 ft 1 in (1.85 m)

Career information
- Playing career: 2012–present
- Position: Small forward

Career history
- 2012–: Neftchi
- 2017: Baku
- 2017: Matryoshkas
- 2017–2019: Sisters Felix
- 2018, 2022: Latinas
Medals
Women's basketball
Representing Azerbaijan
FIBA 3x3 Europe Cup
Silver medal – second place	2025 Copenhagen	Team
Bronze medal – third place	2026 Antwerp	Team
Islamic Solidarity Games
Gold medal – first place	2017 Baku	3x3 basketball
Gold medal – first place	2021 Konya	3x3 basketball
Gold medal – first place	2025 Riyadh	3x3 basketball

Dina Ulyanova (born 1 September 1989) is an Azerbaijani basketball player who plays as a small forward for Neftchi and is a member of the Azerbaijan women's national 3x3 team. She is a three-time winner of the Islamic Solidarity Games (2017, 2021, 2025).

== Early life ==
Dina Ulyanova was born on 1 September 1989 in Baku. Her parents and her sister are also natives of the city of Baku.

== Professional career ==
Since 2012, Ulyanova has been playing for the Baku-based club Neftchi and the Azerbaijan national team. She first played in the national team in Division C matches at the European Championship in North Macedonia under head coach Tatyana Slozhenitsena.

In 2015, as part of the Azerbaijan national team, she took part in the 2015 European Games in Baku.

In 2017, Ulyanova won gold as part of the Azerbaijani national team at the III Islamic Solidarity Games in Baku. In August 2022, at the IV Islamic Solidarity Games in Konya, the Azerbaijani national team with Ulyanova in the team managed to defend the title of champion of the Islamic Games.

In June 2023, Neftchi with Ulyanova in its lineup won the Shusha stage of the Women's 3x3 Basketball World Series, defeating the Netherlands team in the final with a score of 20–12.

In April 2024, the Azerbaijani national team with Ulyanova in the lineup became the winner of the 3x3 basketball qualification tournament in Hong Kong, for the first time in history, the team qualified for the 2024 Summer Olympics in Paris.
