= Txell Alarcón =

Spanish basketball player

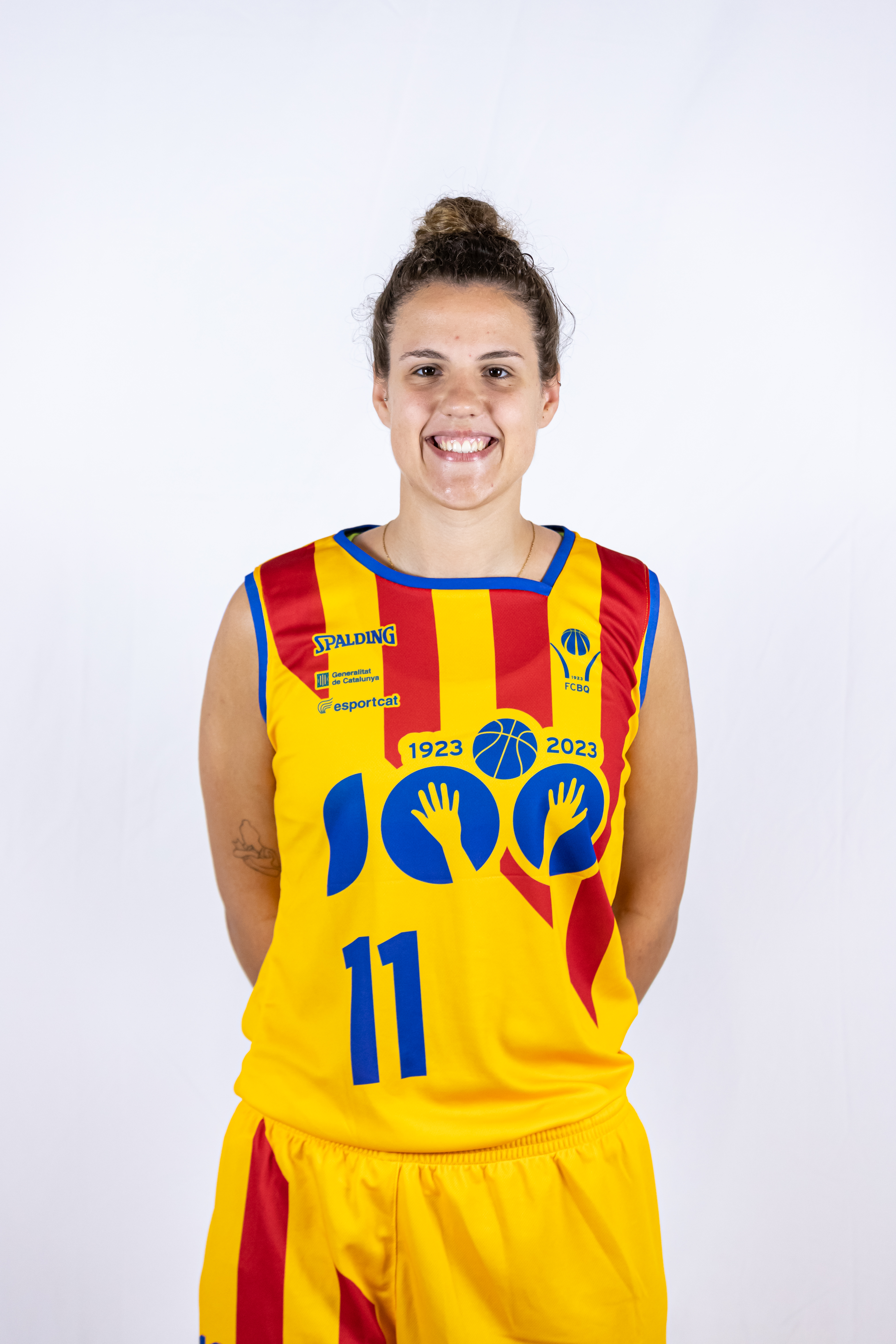

Personal information
- Born: July 31, 2003 (age 23) Barcelona
- Listed height: 5 ft 10 in (1.78 m)
- Position: Point guard
- Stats at Basketball Reference

Txell Alarcón Otero (born July 31, 2003) is a Spanish professional basketball player for the Washington Mystics of the Women's National Basketball Association (WNBA).

== Career ==
Alarcón started playing for the Safa Claror team in Barcelona. In 2014 she moved to Snatt ́s Sant Adria, where she also began to compete in the Catalan and Spanish national teams. For the 2020 season she moved to play at the Campus Promete in Logroño and continued there until 2022.

Later she arrived in Vitoria, to play the next two seasons, 2022 to 2024, in the Kutxabank Araski AES team.

In April 2023, she was drafted by the Washington Mystics with the 32nd pick.

== Club ==
- -2014: Safa Claror.
- 2014-2020: Snatt´s Femení Sant Adria.
- 2020-2022: Campus Promete, Logroño
- 2022-2024: Kutxabank Araski AES, Vitoria
- 2024-: Hozono Global Jairis, Alcantarilla

== National ==
Alarcón was selected by Catalonia and Spain in youth categories. The pandemic left her year without the U17 World Cup and without the U18 European Championship. She played the U19 World Cup with another generation, and the European Championship in Soprón with the U20F in 2022.

== Honors ==
- Best three-point shooter in the Women's League in the 2020-2021 season, with Campus Promete.
- First position | Women's League 2 - 19/20.
- Bronze Medal | U16 European Championship - 2019.
- U20A European Champion - 2022.
- Top scorer and MVP in the U20 - 2022 European Final.

=== National championships ===
Títle	Club	Country	Year
Runners-up in Catalonia Mini	F. Sant Adriá	Spain	2014-2015
Runners-up of Catalonia IntantilB	F. Sant Adriá	Spain	2015-2016
Champions of Catalonia Intantil	F. Sant Adriá	Spain	2016-2017
Runners-up in Spain Intantil	F. Sant. Adriá	Spain	2016-2017
Champions of Catalonia and Spain Cadet	F. Sant Adriá	Spain	2017-2018
Runners-up in Catalonia and Spain Cadet	F. Sant Adriá	Spain	2018-2019

== Awards ==
- Considered Star of the Generation of 2003.
