= Oksana Mollova =

Ukrainian basketball player

BC "Frankivsk"
- Position: Forward
- League: Ukraine Women's League

Personal information
- Born: September 18, 1988 (age 38) Tungor, Sakhalin Oblast, Russian SFSR
- Listed height: 188 cm (6 ft 2 in)
- Listed weight: 62 kg (137 lb)

Oksana Mollova (née Kyseliova, born 18 September 1988 in Tungor, Sakhalin Oblast, Russian SFSR) is a Ukrainian basketball player for BC "Frankivsk" and the Ukrainian national team. During her professional career, she has played for various Ukrainian teams as well as for a team in Kazakhstan and two teams in Poland.

Mollova became more prominent as a 3x3 basketball player. She won bronze at the 2017 World Cup and competed at the 2016 European Championships where the team finished 6th. Mollova was selected to compete at the 2023 European Games. In June 2023, she played for the national team and helped it to qualify for the 2023 FIBA 3x3 Europe Cup.

Mollova started playing basketball in Kalush. At the beginning of her career, Mollova represented Ukraine in various youth and junior tournaments.
