= Helena Oma =

Spanish basketball player (born 1996)

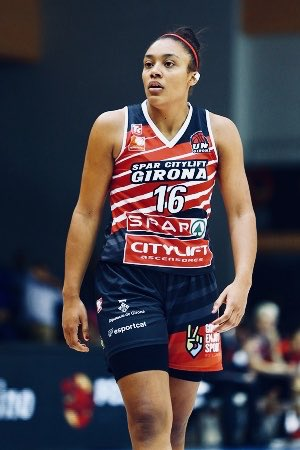
- Oma with Uni Girona in 2018

No. 16 – Basket Zaragoza
- Position: Small forward
- League: Liga Femenina de Baloncesto

Personal information
- Born: 23 October 1996 (age 30) Terrassa, Spain
- Listed height: 1.80 m (5 ft 11 in)

Career history
- 2016–2021: Uni Girona
- 2017–2018: → Sedis Bàsquet (loan)
- 2021–2022: Porta XI Ensino
- 2022–: Basket Zaragoza
Medals
Representing Spain
Women's basketball
U20 EuroBasket
Gold medal – first place	2016 Portugal
Women's 3x3 basketball
FIBA 3x3 Europe Cup
Silver medal – second place	2026 Antwerp	Team
European Games
Bronze medal – third place	2023 Kraków–Małopolska	Team

Helena Oma Giralt (Note: In this Spanish name, the first or paternal surname is Oma and the second or maternal family name is Giralt.) (born 23 October 1996) is a Spanish professional basketball player who plays as a small forward for Liga Femenina de Baloncesto club Basket Zaragoza and the Spain women's national 3x3 team. She was born to an Equatorial Guinean father and a Catalan mother.

== Career ==
She won a bronze medal at the 2023 European Games.

She played for Spar Citylift Girona, and Casedemont Zaragosa. She competed at 2019–20 EuroLeague Women. and at 2020–21 EuroLeague Women.
