= Parade Square =

Square in Warsaw, Poland

Coordinates: 52°13′56″N 21°0′32″E

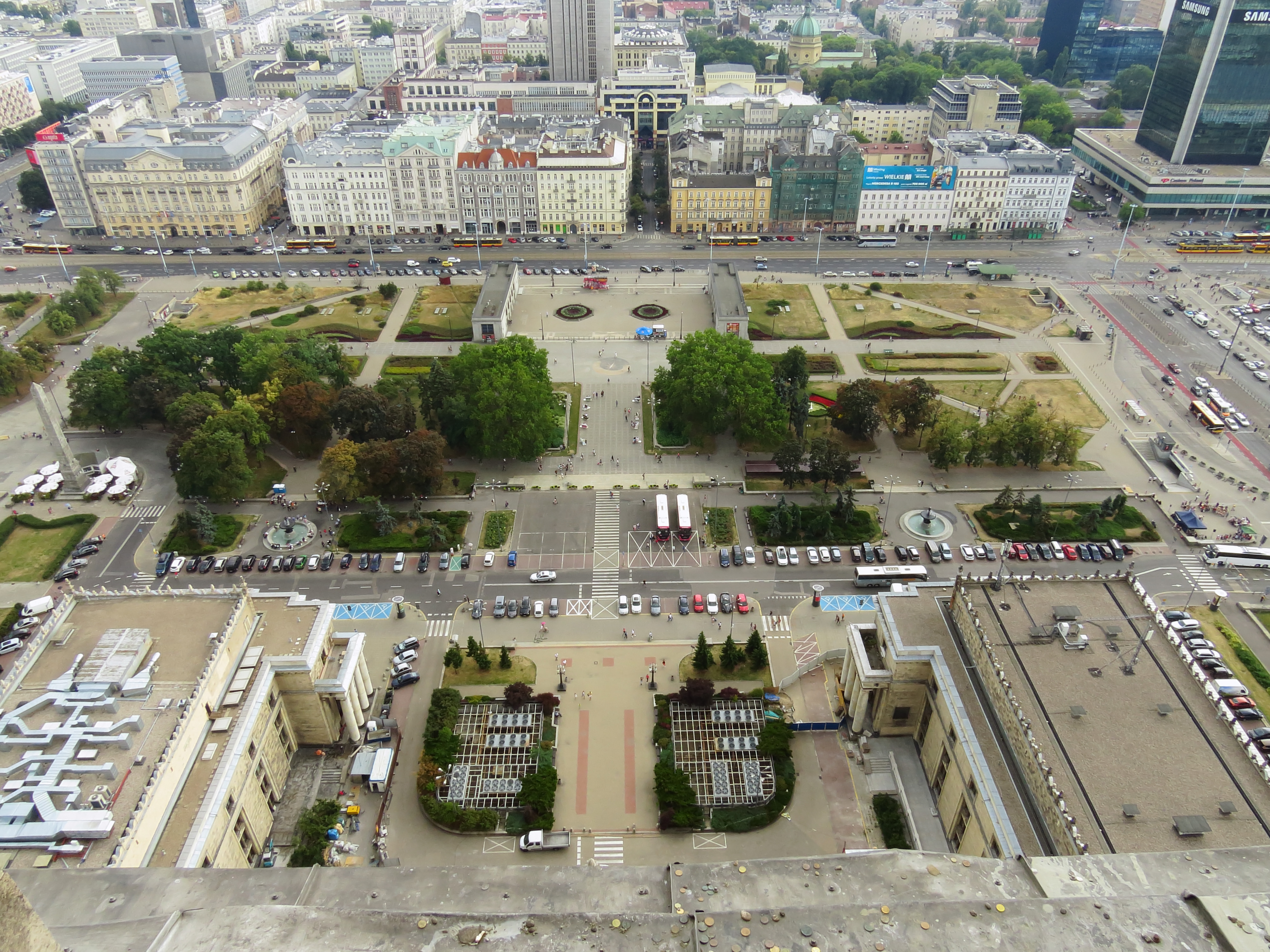
Parade Square as seen from the Palace of Culture and Science

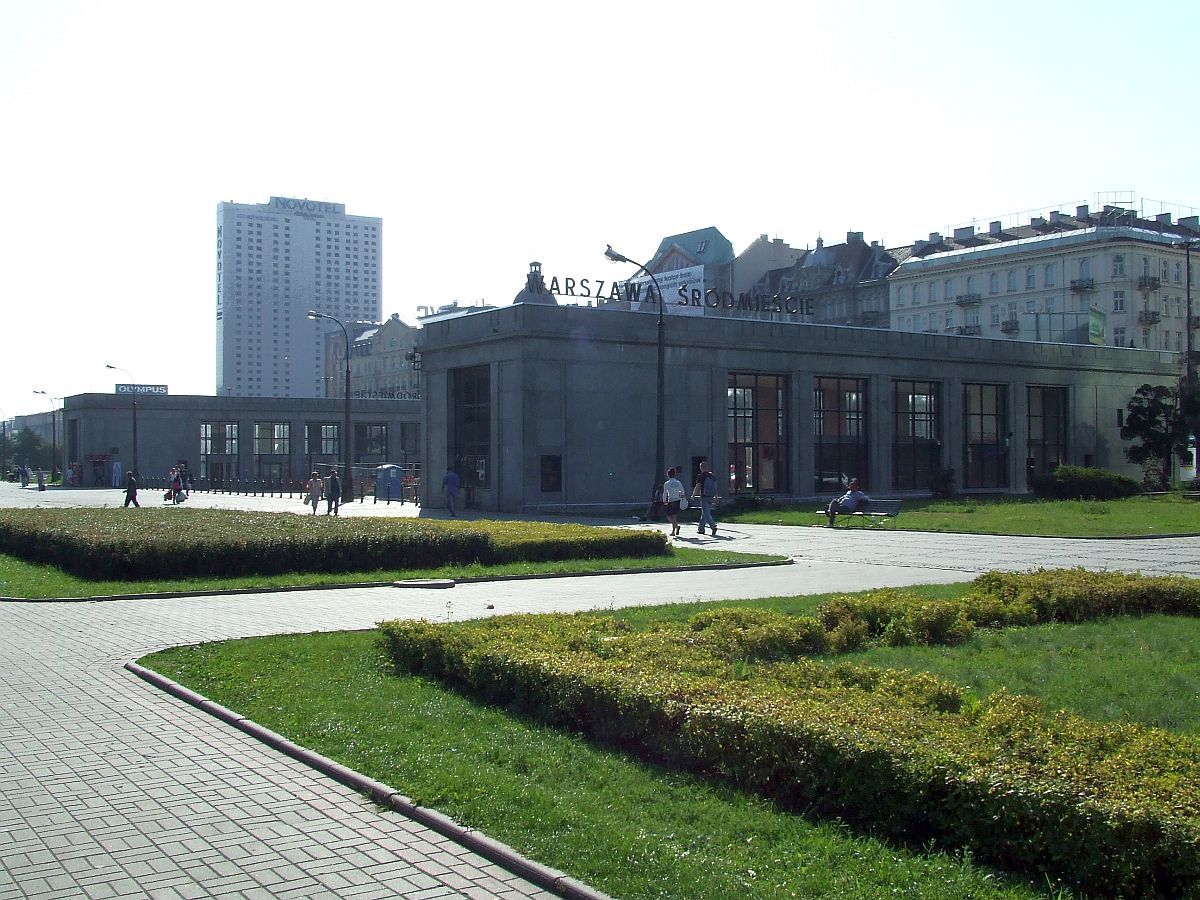
The southern side showing Warszawa Śródmieście railway station

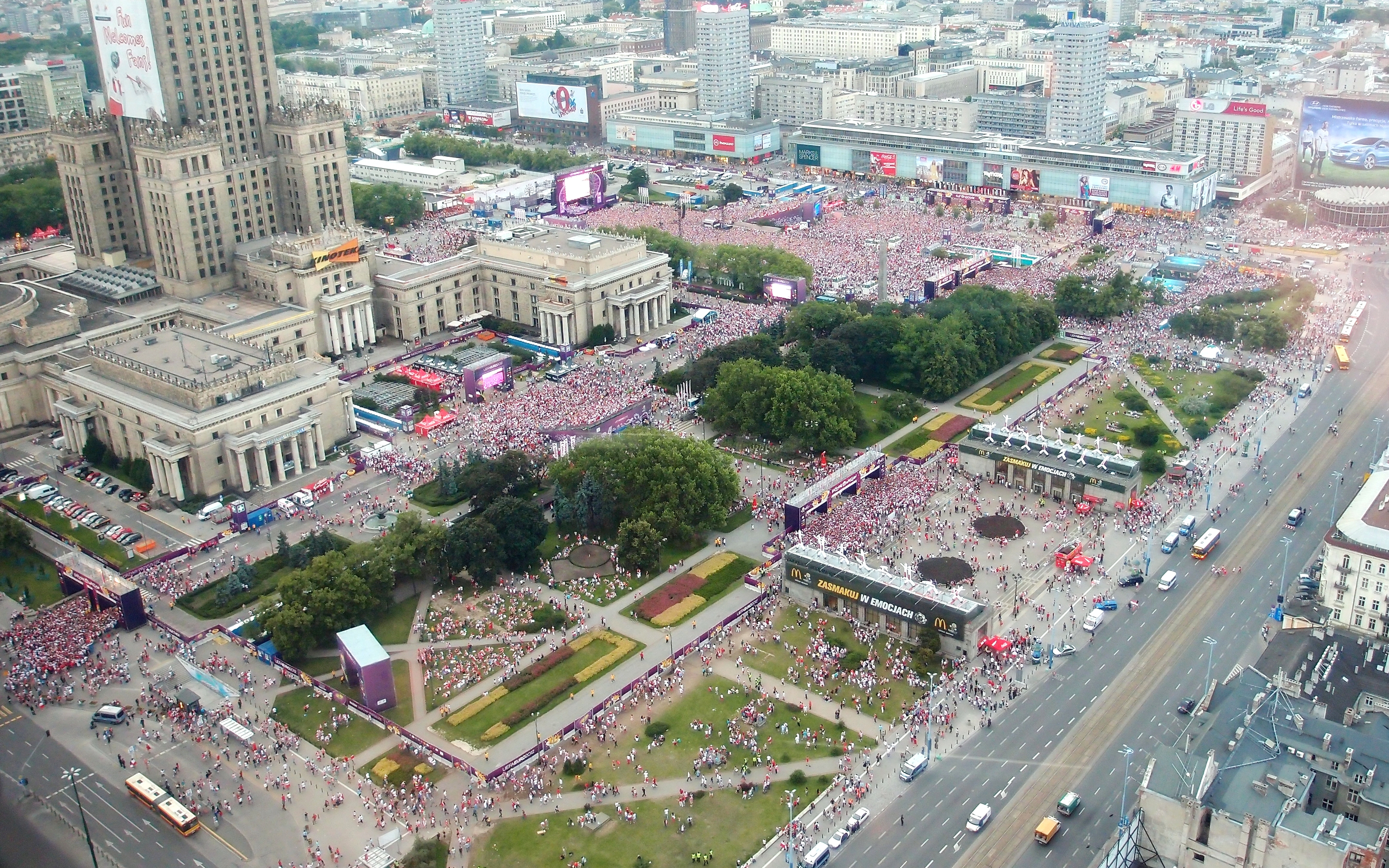
Parade Square during Euro 2012

Parade Square (Polish: Plac Defilad) is a square in downtown Warsaw, laying between Świętokrzyska Street to the north, Aleje Jerozolimskie to the south, Marszałkowska Street to the east and the monumental Palace of Culture and Science to the west. With 147,000 m^{2} (1,580,000 sq ft) of extension, it is the largest city square in Europe and one of the largest in the world.

== History ==
Parade Square is one of the youngest squares in Warsaw, built in the 1950s along with the Palace of Culture and Science. It was used extensively by the government of the Polish People's Republic for various propaganda parades. The biggest parade was held in 1966 to mark the millennium year of the Polish nation.

The square held a key place in the events of 1956. After Władysław Gomułka's restoration to power, on 24 October a rally was held in the square, attended by around 400,000 people. During his speech at the rally, Gomułka condemned Stalinism and announced reforms aimed at democratizing the political system. A symbol of the changes was the refusal to accept Konstantin Rokossovsky, while the microphone was given to activist Lechosław Goździk. The crowd in the square expressed support for the reforms of Polish October, but they also demanded the release from prison of Cardinal Stefan Wyszyński, the leader of the Catholic church in Poland.

On 14 June 1987, during the third apostolic journey to Poland, Pope John Paul II celebrated Mass in the square, ending the Second National Eucharistic Congress. The altar was located at the main entrance to the Palace of Culture and Science. During the Mass, the pope beatified Bishop Michał Kozal, who died in the Dachau concentration camp during the Second World War.

The square lost its importance after the fall of communism, becoming the site of a giant marketplace for some time. Since the marketplace was removed (with its role mostly absorbed by the new suburban market at Marywilska 44), Parade Square has been used mainly as a car park. As the city council plans to allow construction on the site of the square, the parking spaces are to be moved to a new underground facility.

Several other projects are planned to modernise the square and its surroundings, including plans to construct the Museum of Modern Art, a gentrification of a square with a new concert hall, different skyscrapers and other facilities.

During the UEFA Euro 2012, which Warsaw was a host city for, a large Fan Zone was located in the square.

== See also ==
- Świętokrzyski Park
