= Cecilia Muhate =

Spanish basketball player (born 1997)

Ceci Muhate
No. 23 – Uni Girona
- Position: Center
- League: Liga Femenina de Baloncesto

Personal information
- Born: 10 July 1997 (age 29) Madrid, Spain
- Listed height: 1.87 m (6 ft 2 in)

Career information
- College: Ole Miss Rebels

Career history
- 2019–2020: Iraurgi SB
- 2020–2023: CB Leganés
- 2023–: Uni Girona
Medals
Women's 3x3 basketball
Representing Spain
European Games
Bronze medal – third place	2023 Kraków–Małopolska	Team

Cecilia "Ceci" Muhate Peña (born 10 July 1997) is a Spanish professional basketball player who plays as a center for Liga Femenina de Baloncesto club Uni Girona CB and the Spain women's national 3x3 team. She played college basketball at Ole Miss.

== Career ==
Muhate was born to a Mozambican father and a Spanish mother. She competed at the 2017 FIBA U20 Women's European Championship. She won a bronze medal at the 2023 European Games.

She played for Leganes.
