= Alba Prieto =

Spanish basketball player (born 1999)

Personal information
- Nationality: Spanish
- Born: June 15, 1999 (age 27)
- Height: 180 cm (5 ft 11 in)

Sport
- Sport: Basketball
- Position: Shooting guard, small forward
- College team: University of South Florida
Medal record
Women's 3x3 basketball
Representing Spain
European Games
Bronze medal – third place	2023 Kraków–Małopolska	Team

Alba Prieto (born 15 June 1999) is a Spanish professional basketball player. She played college basketball at University of South Florida in the 2017–18 season.

== Early life ==
Prieto was born 15 June 1999 and is the daughter of retired footballer José Miguel Prieto. She was raised in Seville and has two siblings.

== Basketball ==
=== Pre-College ===
At age 16, Prieto made her professional debut playing with CB Conquero during the 2014-15 season.

Prior to joining the University of South Florida, she represented the Spanish National Youth Teams. Notably, she was part of the U17 Spanish team that competed in the FIBA Basketball World Cup. Over the course of seven games, her average performance was 6.7 points, 3.3 rebounds, 1.4 assists, and 1.6 steals per game.

=== College ===
As a freshman at the University of South Florida, Prieto was a point guard during the 2017-18 season. Throughout the season, she participated in 32 games, with an average of 4 points and 1.4 rebounds per game. However, at the conclusion of the season, she decided to transfer.

=== Professional ===
Prieto signed to play for Ensino Lugo in 2020. During the 2021-22 season, she averaged 12.8 points, 2.6 rebounds, 2.6 assists, and 1.2 steals per game.

Prieto competed at the 2021–22 EuroLeague Women and won a bronze medal at the 2023 European Games.

In April 2023, she announced she would no longer be playing for Ensino Lugo.

She has also played for IDK Euskotren.
