= Kamilė Nacickaitė =

Lithuanian basketball player (born 1989)

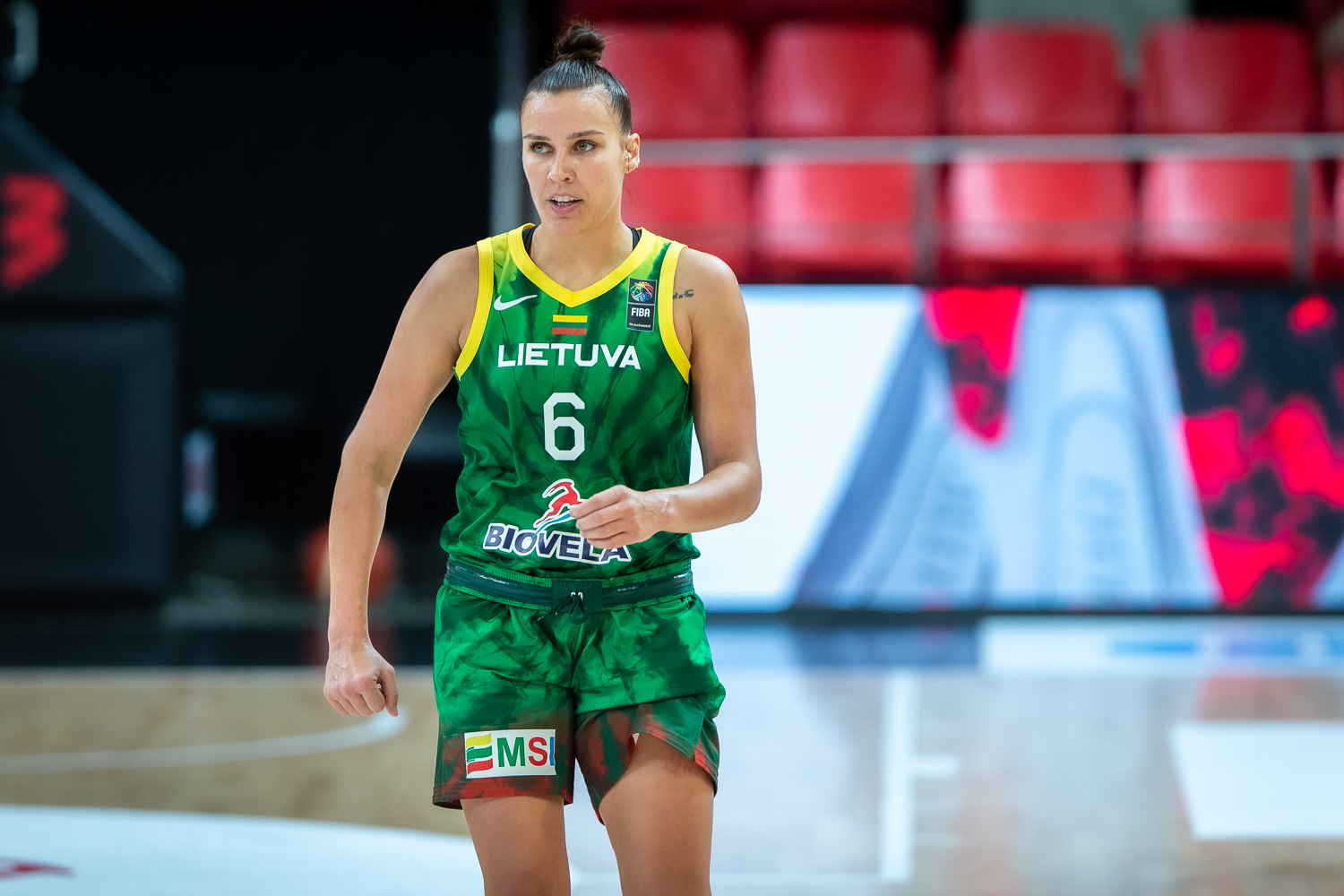
- Kamilė Nacickaitė with Lithuania women's national team

Tango Bourges Basket
- Position: Shooting guard / small forward

Personal information
- Born: December 28, 1989 (age 36) Šiauliai, Lithuania
- Listed height: 5 ft 11 in (1.80 m)

Career information
- College: Drexel (2008–2012)

Career history
- 2012–2013: C.U.S. Chieti
- 2013–2014: TED Ankara Kolejliler
- 2014–2015: İstanbul Üniversitesi
- 2015: Adana ASKİ
- 2016: Fenerbahçe
- 2016–2017: Dynamo Moscow
- 2017–2018: Adana ASKİ
- 2018–2019: Gernika KESB
- 2019–2020: Stadium Casablanca
- 2020–2021: CCC Polkowice
- 2021–2022: Nesibe Aydın GSK
- 2022–2023: Galatasaray
- 2023–: Tango Bourges Basket

Career highlights
- First-team All-CAA (2012); 3× Lithuanian Women Basketball Player of the Year (2016–2018)
Medals
Women's 3x3 basketball
Representing Lithuania
European Games
Gold medal – first place	2023 Kraków–Małopolska	Team
Europe Cup
Bronze medal – third place	2023 Jerusalem

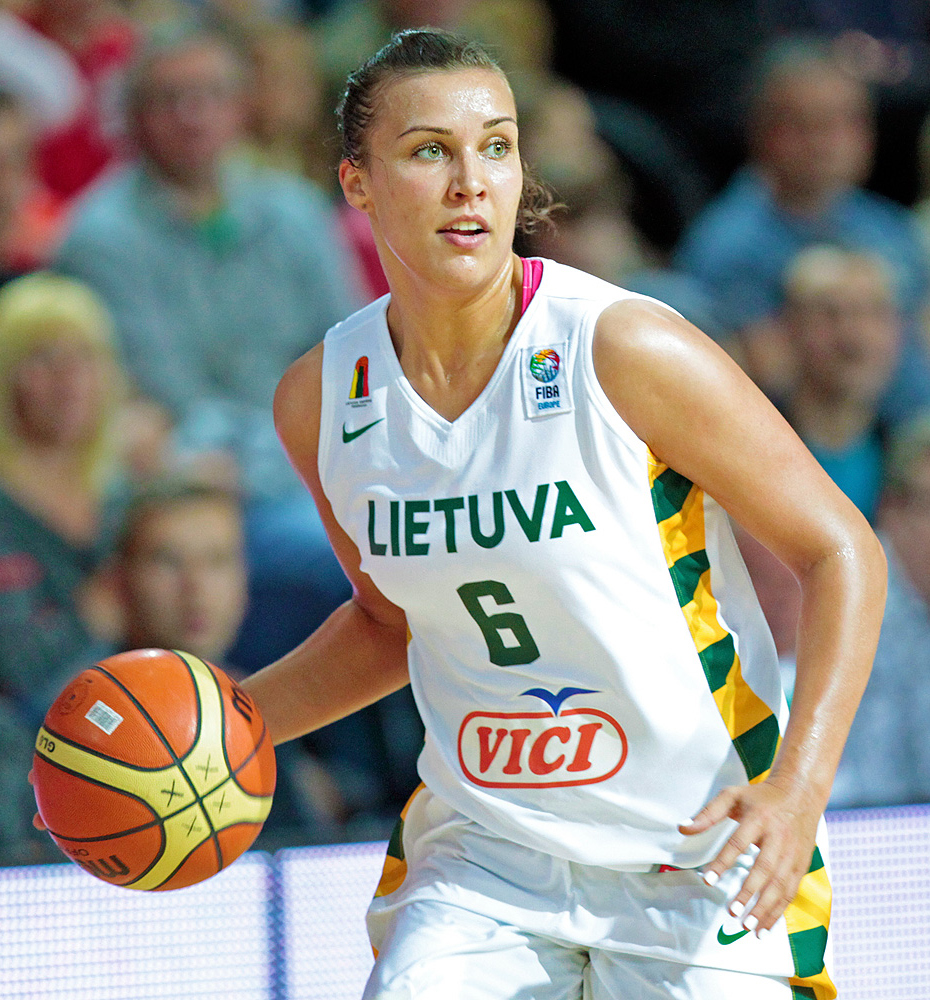

Kamilė Nacickaitė (born 28 December 1989) is a Lithuanian professional female basketball player, currently playing for Tango Bourges Basket in France.

== Club career ==
=== Galatasaray ===
On 11 August 2022, she signed with Galatasaray of the Turkish Women's Basketball Super League (TKBL). She competed at 2022–23 EuroCup Women.

As of July 2023, her contract has expired. Galatasaray club said goodbye to the player on July 6, 2023, by publishing a thank you message.

== National team career ==
She reached the quarter-finals with Lithuanian national team in EuroBasket Women 2015. She won the gold medal at the 2023 European Games.

== Drexel statistics ==
She played for Drexel University.

Legend
GP	Games played	GS	Games started	MPG	Minutes per game
FG%	Field goal percentage	3P%	3-point field goal percentage	FT%	Free throw percentage
RPG	Rebounds per game	APG	Assists per game	SPG	Steals per game
BPG	Blocks per game	PPG	Points per game	**Bold**	Career high

Year	Team	GP	Points	FG%	3P%	FT%	RPG	APG	SPG	BPG	PPG
2008-09	Drexel	32	182	40.4%	40.2%	69.2%	3.4	0.8	0.3	0.3	5.7
2009-10	Drexel	30	347	37.8%	35.6%	77.8%	4.5	**2.0**	0.7	0.2	11.6
2010-11	Drexel	32	**564**	**43.1%**	**47.8%**	81.8%	**6.3**	1.8	**1.2**	**0.5**	17.6
2011-12	Drexel	**33**	556	36.8%	32.6%	**81.9%**	5.9	1.8	1.0	0.5	16.8
Career		127	1649	39.4%	38.2%	80.7%	5.0	1.6	0.8	0.4	13.0
