= Hortense Limouzin =

French basketball player

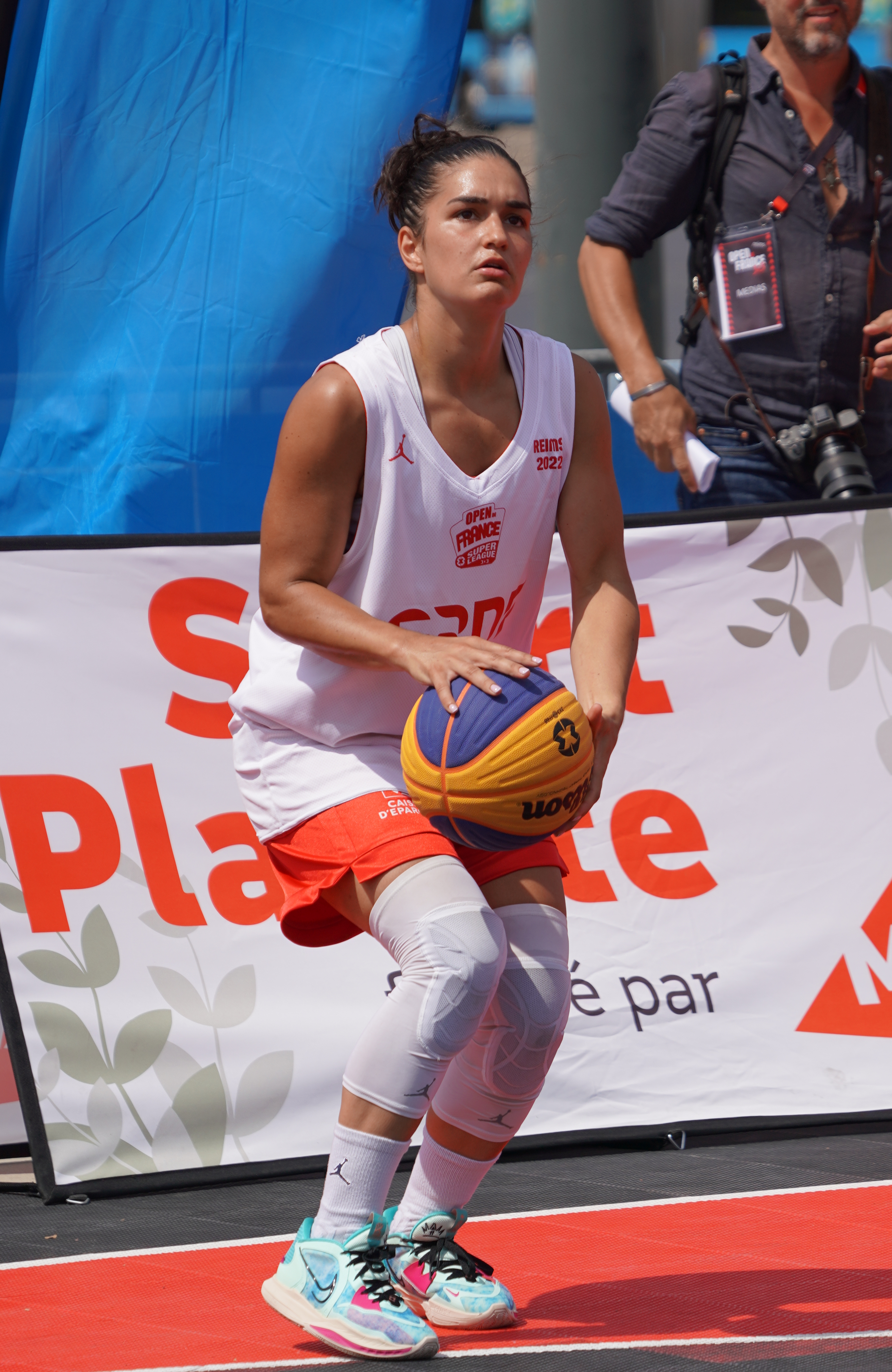
- 2022

Personal information
- Born: 1 July 1998 (age 28)
- Listed height: 1.66 m (5 ft 5 in)
Medals
Women's 3x3 basketball
Representing France
World Cup
Gold medal – first place	2022 Antwerp	Team
Silver medal – second place	2023 Vienna	Team
European Games
Silver medal – second place	2023 Kraków–Małopolska	Team
Europe Cup
Gold medal – first place	2018 Bucharest
Gold medal – first place	2022 Graz

Hortense Limouzin (born 1 July 1998) is a French basketball player. She represented France at the 2024 Summer Olympics in 3x3 event.
