= Gabrielė Šulskė =

Lithuanian basketballer

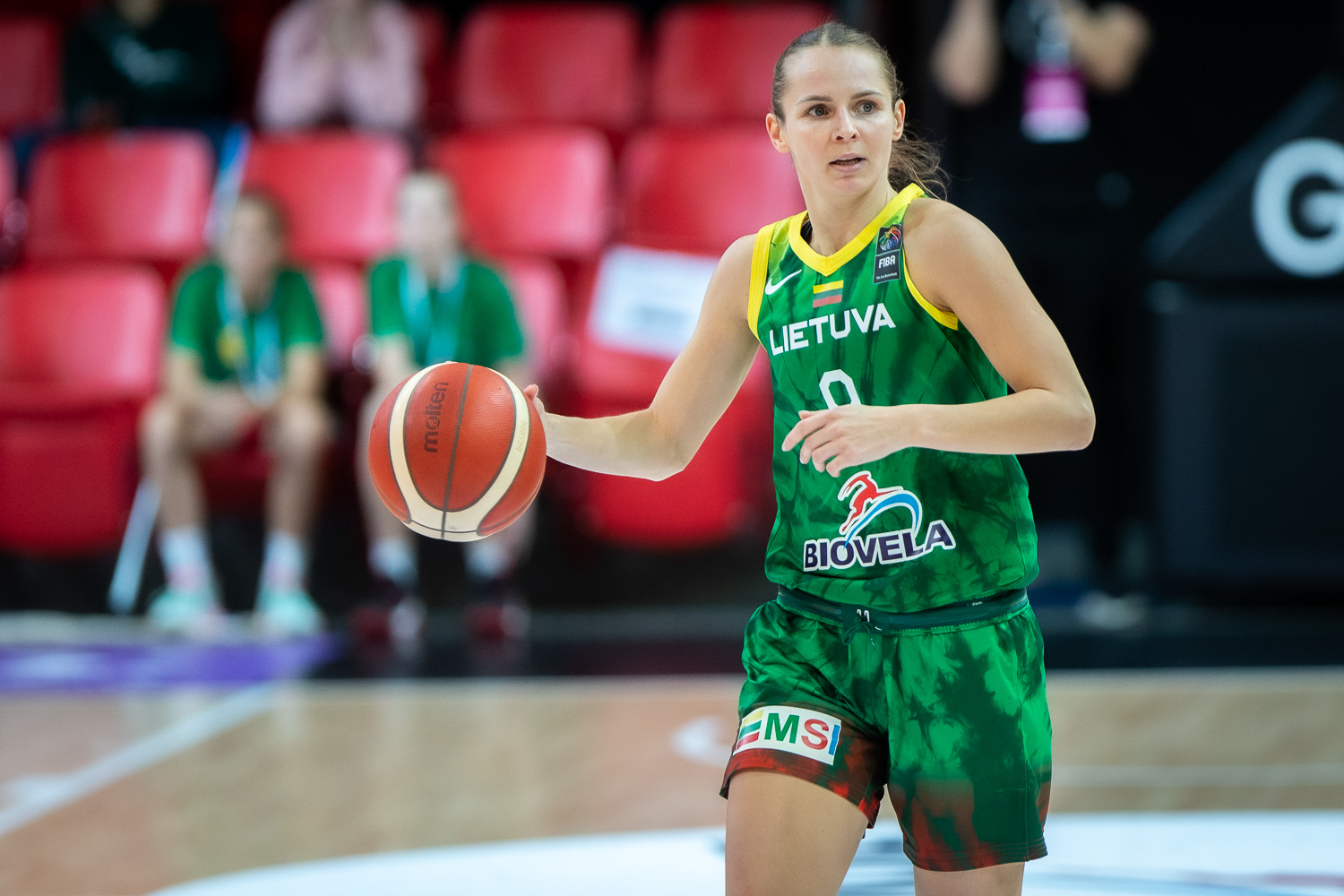

Personal information
- Born: 26 August 1990 (age 36) Šiauliai, Lithuania
- Height: 1.77 m (5 ft 10 in)
- Weight: 70 kg (154 lb)

Sport
- Club: 2007-2009 Šiauliai "Ruta"; 2009-2014 Klaipėda "Lemminkäinen"; 2014-2015 Utena "Utena"; 2015-2016 Minsk "Dumplings"; 2016-2017 Vilnius "Spark"; 2018-2019 Ukmergė "Wolfmergė"; 2019- Vilnius Kibirkštis
Medal record
Women's 3x3 basketball
Representing Lithuania
European Games
Gold medal – first place	2023 Kraków–Małopolska	Team
Europe Cup
Bronze medal – third place	2023 Jerusalem

Gabrielė Gutkauskaitė–Šulskė (born 26 October 1990) is a Lithuanian basketball player and a member of the national team.

== Achievements ==
- Lithuanian Women's Basketball League : 2015
- LKF Women's Basketball Cup: 2015
- European Games 3x3 Basketball Championship: 2023
