= Giedrė Labuckienė =

Lithuanian basketball player (born 1990)

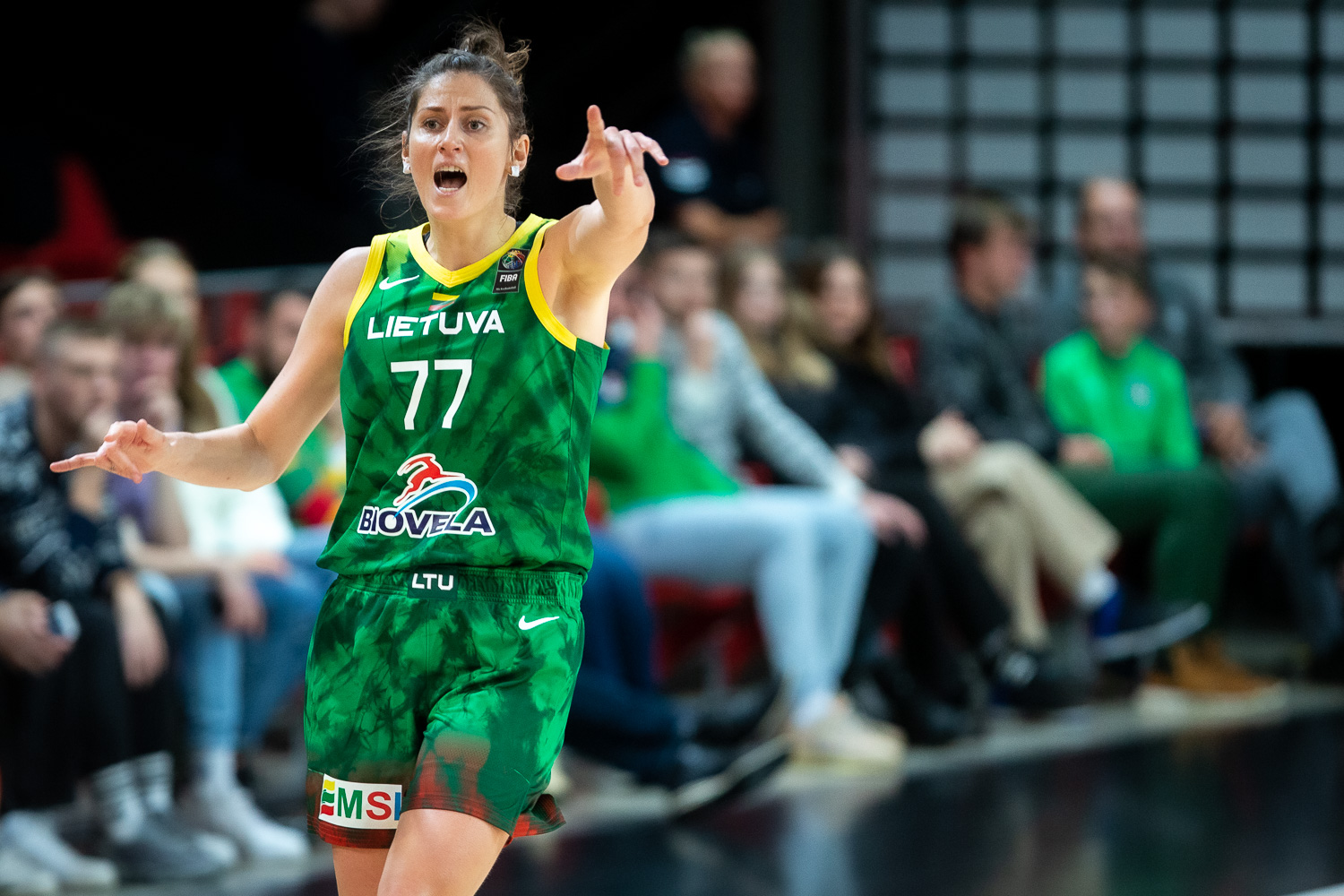

Kibirkstis Vilnius
- Position: Power Forward - Center

Personal information
- Born: 15 July 1990 (age 36) Mažeikiai, Lithuania
- Listed height: 6 ft 4 in (1.93 m)
- Listed weight: 82 kg (181 lb)

Career information
- Playing career: 2005–present

Career history
- 2005–2006: Vilnius Lintel 118
- 2006–2009: Marijampolė Arvi
- 2009–2010: Vilnius TEO
- 2010–2011: Kaunas VIČI-Aistės
- 2011–2013: USO Mondeville
- 2013–2014: Flammes Carolo Basket
- 2014–2016: BC Tsmoki-Minsk
- 2016–2017: TTT Riga
- 2017–2018: Wisła Kraków
- 2019–2020: AZS UMCS Lublin
- 2020–2024: Uni Girona CB
- 2024–: Kibirkštis Vilnius
Medals
Women's basketball
Representing Lithuania
U18 EuroBasket
Gold medal – first place	2008 Slovakia
U16 EuroBasket
Bronze medal – third place	2006 Slovakia
Women's 3x3 basketball
Representing Lithuania
European Games
Gold medal – first place	2023 Kraków–Małopolska	Team
Europe Cup
Bronze medal – third place	2023 Jerusalem

Giedrė Paugaitė–Labuckienė (born 15 July 1990) is a Lithuanian basketball player who competes in the position of heavy winger. She has played in the top leagues in Lithuania, France, Belarus, Latvia, Poland, and Spain.

She married fellow basketball player Arnas Labuckas.

== Achievements ==
As of 3 December 2020, based on unless otherwise noted.

Team

- Champion:
  - Baltic League (2010, 2011, 2015)
  - Lithuania (2010, 2011)
  - Latvia (2017)
  - Belarus (2015)
    - Latvian-Estonian league (2017)
- Runner-up:
  - Lithuania (2009)
  - Belarus (2016)
- Winner of the Lithuanian Cup (2011)
- Cup finalist:
  - Belarus (2015, 2016)
  - Poland (2018)
- Winner of the 2nd Memorial of Franciszka Cegielska and Małgorzata Dydek - Gdynia Super Team (2017)

Individual

- MVP:
  - Belarusian league finals (2015)
  - Belarusian League All-Star Match (2016)
- The best (according to eurobasket.com):
  - middle of the Lithuanian league (2011)
  - winger of the Belarusian league (2015)
- Participant of the Belarusian league all-star game (2015, 2016)
- Credited to (by eurobasket.com):
  - 1st Belarusian League squad (2015)
  - 2nd league squad:
    - Lithuanian (2011)
    - Belarusian (2016)
    - Latvian (2017)
  - Honorable Mention Lithuanian League squad (2010)
- Leader of the French league in blocks (2012)

Representation

- European U-18 Champions (2008)
- Bronze medalist of the European U-16 Championship (2006)
- Championship participant:
  - European Women's Basketball Championship:
    - 2009 – 11th place, 2011 – 7th place, 2013 – 13th place
    - U-20 (2010 – 6th place)
    - U-18 (2006 – 5th place, 2007 – 10th place, 2008)
    - U-16 (2005 – 9th, 2006)
  - U-19 World Championship (2007 – 12th place, 2009 – 8th place)
- Championship leader:
  - world U-19 in blocks (2009)
  - Europe:
    - in collections:
      - U–20 (11.4 – 2010)
      - U–18 (2008)
    - in U-20 blocks (2010)
