= Azerbaijan at the 2024 Summer Olympics =

- IOC code: AZE
- NOC: National Olympic Committee of the Republic of Azerbaijan
- Website: www.olympic.az (in Azerbaijani and English)

in Paris, France 26 July 2024 – 11 August 2024
- Competitors: 48 (28 men and 20 women) in 14 sports
- Flag bearers (opening): Mahammad Abdullayev; Gultaj Mammadaliyeva
- Flag bearers (closing): Gashim Magomedov; Zeynab Hummatova
- Medals Ranked 30th: Gold 2 Silver 2 Bronze 3 Total 7

Summer Olympics appearances (overview)
- 1996; 2000; 2004; 2008; 2012; 2016; 2020; 2024; 2028

Other related appearances
- Russian Empire (1900–1912); Soviet Union (1952–1988); Unified Team (1992)

Azerbaijan competed at the 2024 Summer Olympics in France, that took place from 26 July to 11 August 2024. It was the nation's eighth consecutive appearance at the Summer Olympics in the post-Soviet era. Azerbaijani athletes won two gold (in judo), two silver (in taekwondo and boxing) and three bronze medals (in wrestling) during the competition.

== Competitors ==
The following is the list of number of competitors participating in the Games:

Sport	Men	Women	Total
Archery	0	1	1
Athletics	0	1	1
Badminton	1	1	2
Basketball	0	4	4
Boxing	5	0	5
Fencing	0	1	1
Gymnastics	0	7	7
Judo	7	2	9
Rowing	0	1	1
Shooting	1	0	1
Swimming	1	1	2
Taekwondo	1	0	1
Triathlon	1	0	1
Wrestling	11	1	12
Total	28	20	48

== Medalists ==
Medal	Name	Sport	Event	Date
Gold	Hidayat Heydarov	Judo	Men's −73 kg	29 July
Gold	Zelym Kotsoiev	Judo	Men's −100 kg	1 August
Silver	Gashim Magomedov	Taekwondo	Men's 58 kg	7 August
Silver	Loren Alfonso	Boxing	Men's heavyweight	9 August
Bronze	Hasrat Jafarov	Wrestling	Men's Greco-Roman 67 kg	8 August
Bronze	Giorgi Meshvildishvili	Wrestling	Men's freestyle 125 kg	10 August
Bronze	Magomedkhan Magomedov	Wrestling	Men's freestyle 97 kg	11 August

Medals by sport
Sport	1st place, gold medalist(s)	2nd place, silver medalist(s)	3rd place, bronze medalist(s)	Total
Judo	2	0	0	2
Boxing	0	1	0	1
Taekwondo	0	1	0	1
Wrestling	0	0	3	3
Total	2	2	3	7

== Archery ==
For the first time since 2016, one Azerbaijani archer qualified for the 2024 Summer Olympics women's individual recurve competitions by virtue of her result at the 2024 Final Qualification Tournament in Antalya, Turkey.

Athlete	Event	Ranking round		Round of 64	Round of 32	Round of 16	Quarterfinals	Semifinals	Final / BM	
Athlete	Event	Score	Seed	Opposition Score	Opposition Score	Opposition Score	Opposition Score	Opposition Score	Opposition Score	Rank
Yaylagul Ramazanova	Women's individual	647	39	An (CHN); W 6–5	Kroppen (GER); L 2–6	Did not advance				17

== Athletics ==
Azerbaijani track and field athletes achieved the entry standards for Paris 2024, either by passing the direct qualifying mark (or time for track and road races) or by world ranking, in the following events (a maximum of 3 athletes each):

Key

- Note–Ranks given for track events are within the athlete's heat only
- Q = Qualified for the next round
- q = Qualified for the next round as a fastest loser or, in field events, by position without achieving the qualifying target
- NR = National record
- N/A = Round not applicable for the event
- Bye = Athlete not required to compete in round

Field events

Athlete	Event	Qualification		Final	
Athlete	Event	Distance	Position	Distance	Position
Hanna Skydan	Women's hammer throw	72.55	6 q	73.66	7

== Badminton ==
Azerbaijan entered two badminton players into the Olympic tournament based on the BWF Race to Paris Rankings.

Athlete	Event	Group stage			Round of 16	Quarter-final	Semi-final	Final / BM	
Athlete	Event	Opposition Score	Opposition Score	Rank	Opposition Score	Opposition Score	Opposition Score	Opposition Score	Rank
Ade Resky Dwicahyo	Men's singles	Filimon (AUT); W 2–0 (21–18; 21–11)	Antonsen (DEN); L 0–2 (10–21; 14–21)	2	Did not advance				14
Keisha Fatimah Azzahra	Women's singles	He BJ (CHN); L 0–2 (8–21; 7–21)	Gilmour (GBR); L 0–2 (13–21; 11–21)	3	Did not advance				27

== Basketball ==
=== 3×3 basketball ===
Summary

Team	Event	Group stage								Quarterfinal	Semifinal	Final / BM	
Team	Event	Opposition Score	Opposition Score	Opposition Score	Opposition Score	Opposition Score	Opposition Score	Opposition Score	Rank	Opposition Score	Opposition Score	Opposition Score	Rank
Azerbaijan women's	Women's tournament	Spain; L 16–18	United States; W 20–17	France; L 10–15	Germany; L 8–12	Australia; L 12–21	China; W 21–19	Canada; L 19–21	7	Did not advance			7

==== Women's tournament ====
The Azerbaijan women's 3x3 team by winning the FIBA Universality-driven Olympic Qualifying Tournament 1 in Hong Kong. Making the nation's debut at 3x3 basketball.

Team roster

The roster was revealed on 3 July 2024.

- Marcedes Walker
- Alexandra Mollenhauer
- Dina Ulyanova
- Tiffany Hayes

Group play

Pos	Team	Pld	W	L	PF	PA	PD	Qualification
1	Germany	7	6	1	117	100	+17	Semifinals
2	Spain	7	4 (Note: Spain 2–1; United States 2–1; Canada 1–2; Australia 1–2. Sorted by points scored after first tie broken.)	3	115	114	+1	Semifinals
3	United States	7	4	3	108	109	−1	Play-ins
4	Canada	7	4	3	129	112	+17	Play-ins
5	Australia	7	4	3	127	122	+5	Play-ins
6	China	7	2 (Note: China 1–1; France 1–1; Azerbaijan 1–1. Sorted by points scored.)	5	107	123	−16	Play-ins
7	Azerbaijan	7	2	5	106	123	−17	
8	France (H)	7	2	5	99	105	−6	

Source: FIBA
Rules for classification: 1) Wins; 2) Head-to-head record; 3) Points scored.
(H) Hosts
Notes:

30 July 2024
21:00

Boxscore

Spain	18–16	Azerbaijan
Pts: Gimeno, Alonso de Armiño 5		Pts: Hayes 10

Place de la Concorde, Paris
Referees: Edmond Ho (HKG), Dorothy Okatch (BOT)

31 July 2024
21:30

Boxscore

United States	17–20	Azerbaijan
Pts: Hamby 7		Pts: Hayes 11

Place de la Concorde, Paris
Referees: Jasmina Juras (SRB), Kim Ga-in (KOR)

1 August 2024
12:30

Boxscore

Azerbaijan	10–15	France
Pts: Hayes 5		Pts: Limouzin 5

Place de la Concorde, Paris
Referees: Dorothy Okatch (BOT), Markos Michaelides (SUI)

1 August 2024
18:30

Boxscore

Germany	12–8	Azerbaijan
Pts: Brunckhorst, Reichert 4		Pts: Mollenhauer 4

Place de la Concorde, Paris
Referees: Kim Ga-in (KOR), Edmond Ho (HKG)

2 August 2024
09:30

Boxscore

Australia	21–12	Azerbaijan
Pts: Whittle 8		Pts: Hayes 6

Place de la Concorde, Paris
Referees: Deanna Jackson (USA), Dorothy Okatch (BOT)

2 August 2024
17:30

Boxscore

Azerbaijan	21–19 (OT)	China
Pts: Hayes 11		Pts: Chen 8

Place de la Concorde, Paris
Referees: Markos Michaelides (SUI), Kim Ga-in (KOR)

3 August 2024
17:30

Boxscore

Azerbaijan	19–21	Canada
Pts: Hayes 9		Pts: M. Plouffe 8

Place de la Concorde, Paris
Referees: Dorothy Okatch (BOT), Edmond Ho (HKG)

== Boxing ==
Azerbaijan entered five boxers into the Olympic tournament. Murad Allahverdiyev and Mahammad Abdullayev scored an outright quarterfinal and semifinal victory to secure their spot in middleweight and super heavyweight division at the 2023 European Games in Nowy Targ, Poland. Meanwhile, Nijat Huseynov, qualified for the games in the flyweight division at the 2024 World Olympic Qualification Tournament 1 in Busto Arsizio, Italy,Malik Hasanov (men's lightweight) and Loren Alfonso (men's heavyweight) qualified for the games at the 2024 World Olympic Qualification Tournament 2 in Bangkok, Thailand.

Athlete	Event	Round of 32	Round of 16	Quarterfinals	Semifinals	Final	
Athlete	Event	Opposition Result	Opposition Result	Opposition Result	Opposition Result	Opposition Result	Rank
Nijat Huseynov	Men's 51 kg	Bye	Alcántara (DOM); L 0–5	Did not advance			9
Malik Hasanov	Men's 63.5 kg	Bye	Guruli (GEO); L 0–5	Did not advance			9
Murad Allahverdiyev	Men's 80 kg	Bye	Abdelgawwad (EGY); W 5–0	Nurbek Oralbay (KAZ); L 0–5	Did not advance		5
Loren Alfonso	Men's 92 kg	—N/a	La Cruz (CUB); W 3–2	Aibek Oralbay (KAZ); W 3–2	Reyes (ESP); W 4–1	Mullojonov (UZB); L 0–5	2nd place, silver medalist(s)
Mahammad Abdullayev	Men's +92 kg	—N/a	Tiafack (GER); L 0–5	Did not advance			9

== Fencing ==
Azerbaijan entered one fencer into the Olympic competition. Anna Bashta qualified for the games after receiving the re-allocation of unused quota places.

Athlete	Event	Round of 64	Round of 32	Round of 16	Quarterfinal	Semifinal	Final / BM	
Athlete	Event	Opposition Score	Opposition Score	Opposition Score	Opposition Score	Opposition Score	Opposition Score	Rank
Anna Bashta	Women's sabre	Bye	Yang (CHN); W 15–9	Kharlan (UKR); L 6–15	Did not advance			15

== Gymnastics ==
=== Rhythmic ===
Azerbaijan entered a full-squad rhythmic gymnast into Paris 2024. One gymnast qualified for the games through the individual all-around tournament, by virtue of top fifteen eligible nation's results at the 2023 World Championships in Valencia, Spain; meanwhile five other gymnast qualified for the group all-around through the 2024 European Championships in Budapest, Hungary.

Athlete	Event	Qualification						Final					
Athlete	Event	Hoop	Ball	Clubs	Ribbon	Total	Rank	Hoop	Ball	Clubs	Ribbon	Total	Rank
Zohra Aghamirova	Individual	32.500	30.200	26.750	28.400	117.850	19	Did not advance					

Athletes	Event	Qualification				Final			
Athletes	Event	5 apps	3+2 apps	Total	Rank	5 apps.	3+2 apps	Total	Rank
Gullu Aghalarzade; Laman Alimuradova; Zeynab Hummatova; Yelyzaveta Luzan; Darya Sorokina	Group	33.850	28.150	62.000	8 Q	34.850	31.600	66.450	5

=== Trampoline ===
Azerbaijan entered one gymnast into the women's trampoline events through the final ranking of 2023–2024 Trampoline World Cup series.

Athlete	Event	Qualification		Final	
Athlete	Event	Score	Rank	Score	Rank
Seljan Mahsudova	Women's	53.750	10	Did not advance	

== Judo ==
Azerbaijan has qualified nine judokas via the IJF World Ranking List and continental quotas in Europe.

Men

Athlete	Event	Round of 64	Round of 32	Round of 16	Quarterfinals	Semifinals	Repechage	Final / BM	
Athlete	Event	Opposition Result	Opposition Result	Opposition Result	Opposition Result	Opposition Result	Opposition Result	Opposition Result	Rank
Balabay Aghayev	Men's −60 kg	—N/a	Bye	Kim Won-jin (KOR); L 00–10	Did not advance				9
Yashar Najafov	Men's −66 kg	—N/a	Bunčić (SRB); L 00–01	Did not advance					17
Hidayat Heydarov	Men's −73 kg	—N/a	Bye	Butbul (ISR); W 10–00	Margelidon (CAN); W 10–00	Gjakova (KOS); W 01–00	Bye	Gaba (FRA); W 10–00	1st place, gold medalist(s)
Zelim Tckaev	Men's −81 kg	Bye	Oumar Djalo (FRA); L 00–10	Did not advance					17
Eljan Hajiyev	Men's −90 kg	—N/a	Žgank (TUR); W 01–00	Hambou (FRA); L 00–10	Did not advance				9
Zelym Kotsoiev	Men's −100 kg	—N/a	Bye	Kuczera (POL); W 10–00	Paltchik (ISR); W 01–00	Turoboyev (UZB); W 01–00	Bye	Sulamanidze (GEO); W 10–01	1st place, gold medalist(s)
Ushangi Kokauri	Men's +100 kg	—N/a	Silva (BRA); W 10–00	Puumalainen (FIN); W 10–00	Kim Min-jong (KOR); L 00–10	Did not advance	Granda (CUB); L 00–10	Did not advance	7

Women

Athlete	Event	Round of 64	Round of 32	Round of 16	Quarterfinals	Semifinals	Repechage	Final / BM	
Athlete	Event	Opposition Result	Opposition Result	Opposition Result	Opposition Result	Opposition Result	Opposition Result	Opposition Result	Rank
Leyla Aliyeva	Women's −48 kg	—N/a	Kurbonova (UZB); L 00–01	Did not advance					17
Gultaj Mammadaliyeva	Women's −52 kg	—N/a	Delgado (USA); L 00–01	Did not advance					17

== Rowing ==
For the first time since 2016 games in Rio de Janeiro, Azerbaijani rower qualified one boats for the women's single sculls event, through the 2024 European Qualification Regatta in Szeged, Hungary.

Athlete	Event	Heats		Repechage		Quarterfinals		Semifinals		Final	
Athlete	Event	Time	Rank	Time	Rank	Time	Rank	Time	Rank	Time	Rank
Diana Dymchenko	Women's single sculls	7:52.53	3 QF	Bye		7:53.76	4 SC/D	7:59.23	3 FC	7:35.19	17

Qualification Legend: FA=Final A (medal); FB=Final B (non-medal); FC=Final C (non-medal); FD=Final D (non-medal); FE=Final E (non-medal); FF=Final F (non-medal); SA/B=Semifinals A/B; SC/D=Semifinals C/D; SE/F=Semifinals E/F; QF=Quarterfinals; R=Repechage

== Shooting ==
Azerbaijani shooters achieved quota places for the following events based on their results at the 2022 and 2023 ISSF World Championships, 2022, 2023, and 2024 European Championships, 2023 European Games, and 2024 ISSF World Olympic Qualification Tournament.

Athlete	Event	Qualification		Final	
Athlete	Event	Points	Rank	Points	Rank
Ruslan Lunev	Men's 10 m air pistol	571	24	Did not advance	
Ruslan Lunev	Men's 25 m rapid fire pistol	580-22x	18	Did not advance	

== Swimming ==
Azerbaijan sent two swimmers to compete at the 2024 Paris Olympics.

Athlete	Event	Heat		Semifinal		Final	
Athlete	Event	Time	Rank	Time	Rank	Time	Rank
Ramil Valizada	Men's 200 m butterfly	1:59.77	25	Did not advance			
Mariam Sheikhalizadeh	Women's 50 m freestyle	26.76	35	Did not advance			

== Taekwondo ==
Azerbaijan qualified one athlete to compete at the games. Gashim Magomedov qualified for Paris 2024 by virtue of finishing first within the Grand Slam Series Rankings in his division.

Athlete	Event	Qualification	Round of 16	Quarterfinals	Semifinals	Repechage	Final / BM	
Athlete	Event	Opposition Result	Opposition Result	Opposition Result	Opposition Result	Opposition Result	Opposition Result	Rank
Gashim Magomedov	Men's −58 kg	Bye	Woolley (IRL); W 2–0	Vicente (ESP); W 2–0	Dell'Aquila (ITA); W 2–0	Bye	Park Tae-joon (KOR); L 0–1 WDR	2nd place, silver medalist(s)

== Triathlon ==
Azerbaijan entered one male triathlete in the triathlon events for Paris, following the release of final individual olympics qualification ranking.

Individual

Athlete	Event	Time						Rank
Athlete	Event	Swim (1.5 km)	Trans 1	Bike (40 km)	Trans 2	Run (10 km)	Total	Rank
Rostyslav Pevtsov	Men's	21:33	0:49	56:01	0:31	31:42	1:50:36	43

== Wrestling ==
Azerbaijan qualified twelve wrestlers for the following classes into the Olympic competition. Three of them qualified for the games by virtue of top five results through the 2023 World Championships in Belgrade, Serbia; five of them qualified through the 2024 European Qualification Tournament in Baku, Azerbaijan; and four of them qualified through the 2024 World Qualification Tournament in Istanbul, Turkey.

Key:

- VT (ranking points: 5–0 or 0–5) – Victory by fall.
- VB (ranking points: 5–0 or 0–5) – Victory by injury (VF for forfeit, VA for withdrawal or disqualification)
- PP (ranking points: 3–1 or 1–3) – Decision by points – the loser with technical points.
- PO (ranking points: 3–0 or 0–3) – Decision by points – the loser without technical points.
- ST (ranking points: 4–0 or 0–4) – Great superiority – the loser without technical points and a margin of victory of at least 8 (Greco-Roman) or 10 (freestyle) points.
- SP (ranking points: 4–1 or 1–4) – Technical superiority – the loser with technical points and a margin of victory of at least 8 (Greco-Roman) or 10 (freestyle) points.

Freestyle

Athlete	Event	Round of 16	Quarterfinal	Semifinal	Repechage	Final / BM	
Athlete	Event	Opposition Result	Opposition Result	Opposition Result	Opposition Result	Opposition Result	Rank
Aliabbas Rzazade	Men's 57 kg	Abdullaev (UZB); L 4–11 ^{PP}	Did not advance				13
Haji Aliyev	Men's 65 kg	Gomez (MEX); W 7–0 ^{PO}	Muszukajev (HUN); L 3–10 ^{PP}	Did not advance			8
Turan Bayramov	Men's 74 kg	Valiev (ALB); L 3–4 ^{PP}	Did not advance				13
Osman Nurmagomedov	Men's 86 kg	Byambasuren (MGL); W 11–2 ^{PP}	Amine (SMR); L 14–16 ^{PP}	Did not advance			8
Magomedkhan Magomedov	Men's 97 kg	Pérez (DOM); W 9–0 ^{PO}	Baranowski (POL); W 7–2 ^{PP}	Matcharashvili (GEO); L 0–5 ^{PO}	Bye	Mchedlidze (UKR); W 10–0 ^{ST}	3rd place, bronze medalist(s)
Giorgi Meshvildishvili	Men's 125 kg	Kamal (EGY); W 4–0 ^{PO}	Munkhtur (MGL); W 12–2 ^{SP}	Petriashvili (GEO); L 0–7 ^{PO}	Bye	Baran (POL); W 9–3 ^{PP}	3rd place, bronze medalist(s)
Mariya Stadnik	Women's 50 kg	Blayvas (GER); W 6–2 ^{PP}	Dolgorjav (MGL); L 4–4 ^{PP}	Did not advance			8

Men's Greco-Roman

Athlete	Event	Round of 16	Quarterfinal	Semifinal	Repechage	Final / BM	
Athlete	Event	Opposition Result	Opposition Result	Opposition Result	Opposition Result	Opposition Result	Rank
Murad Mammadov	Men's 60 kg	Rodríguez (VEN); L 5–6 ^{PP}	Did not advance				13
Hasrat Jafarov	Men's 67 kg	El-Sayed (EGY); W 9–0 ^{ST}	Petic (MDA); W 3–1 ^{PP}	Nasibov (UKR); L 3–3 ^{PP}	Bye	Ismailov (KGZ); W 8–0 ^{ST}	3rd place, bronze medalist(s)
Sanan Suleymanov	Men's 77 kg	Mnatsakanian (BUL); W 2–0 ^{PO}	Lévai (HUN); W 1–1 ^{PP}	Zhadrayev (KAZ); L 1–6 ^{PP}	Bye	Makhmudov (KGZ); L 5–6 ^{PP}	5
Rafig Huseynov	Men's 87 kg	Losonczi (HUN); L 2–5 ^{PP}	Did not advance				13
Sabah Shariati	Men's 130 kg	Nabi (EST); W 1–1 ^{PP}	Syzdykov (KAZ); W 4–0 ^{PO}	López (CUB); L 1–4 ^{PP}	Bye	Mirzazadeh (IRI); L 0–4 ^{PO}	5

== See also ==
- Azerbaijan at the 2024 Summer Paralympics
