= Basketball at the 2024 Summer Olympics =

Basketball at the Games of the XXXIII Olympiad
- Basketball pictograms
- Venue: Stade Pierre-Mauroy (5x5 prelims phase); Bercy Arena; Place de la Concorde (3x3)
- Dates: 27 July – 11 August 2024
- No. of events: 4 (2 men, 2 women)
- Competitors: 352 from 20 nations

The basketball competitions at the 2024 Summer Olympics in Paris, France, were held from 27 July to 11 August 2024. Preliminary 5x5 basketball matches occurred at Stade Pierre-Mauroy in Lille, with the final phase staged at the Bercy Arena (not referred to as the Accor Arena due to IOC rules disallowing Olympic host venues to be named after corporate sponsors) in Paris. Retaining its position in the program, the 3x3 competitions were played at Place de la Concorde.

== Medal summary ==
=== Medal table ===
* Host nation (France)

Rank	NOC	Gold	Silver	Bronze	Total
1	United States	2	0	1	3
2	Germany	1	0	0	1
2	Netherlands	1	0	0	1
4	France*	0	3	0	3
5	Spain	0	1	0	1
6	Australia	0	0	1	1
6	Lithuania	0	0	1	1
6	Serbia	0	0	1	1
Totals (8 entries)		4	4	4	12

=== Medalists ===
Event	Gold	Silver	Bronze
Men	United States; Bam Adebayo; Devin Booker; Stephen Curry; Anthony Davis; Kevin Durant; Anthony Edwards; Joel Embiid; Tyrese Haliburton; Jrue Holiday; LeBron James; Jayson Tatum; Derrick White	France; Andrew Albicy; Nicolas Batum; Isaïa Cordinier; Bilal Coulibaly; Nando de Colo; Evan Fournier; Rudy Gobert; Mathias Lessort; Frank Ntilikina; Matthew Strazel; Victor Wembanyama; Guerschon Yabusele	Serbia; Aleksa Avramović; Bogdan Bogdanović; Dejan Davidovac; Ognjen Dobrić; Marko Gudurić; Nikola Jokić; Nikola Jović; Vanja Marinković; Vasilije Micić; Nikola Milutinov; Filip Petrušev; Uroš Plavšić
Women	United States; Napheesa Collier; Kahleah Copper; Chelsea Gray; Brittney Griner; Sabrina Ionescu; Jewell Loyd; Kelsey Plum; Breanna Stewart; Diana Taurasi; Alyssa Thomas; A'ja Wilson; Jackie Young	France; Valériane Ayayi; Marième Badiane; Romane Bernies; Alexia Chery; Marine Fauthoux; Marine Johannès; Leïla Lacan; Dominique Malonga; Sarah Michel; Iliana Rupert; Janelle Salaün; Gabby Williams	Australia; Amy Atwell; Isobel Borlase; Cayla George; Lauren Jackson; Tess Madgen; Ezi Magbegor; Jade Melbourne; Alanna Smith; Stephanie Talbot; Marianna Tolo; Kristy Wallace; Sami Whitcomb
Men 3x3	Netherlands; Jan Driessen; Dimeo van der Horst; Arvin Slagter; Worthy de Jong	France; Lucas Dussoulier; Timothé Vergiat; Jules Rambaut; Franck Seguela	Lithuania; Šarūnas Vingelis; Gintautas Matulis; Aurelijus Pukelis; Evaldas Džiaugys
Women 3x3	Germany; Marie Reichert; Elisa Mevius; Sonja Greinacher; Svenja Brunckhorst	Spain; Vega Gimeno; Sandra Ygueravide; Juana Camilión; Gracia Alonso de Armiño	United States; Dearica Hamby; Cierra Burdick; Hailey Van Lith; Rhyne Howard

== Qualification summary ==
Nation	5x5		3x3		Athletes
Nation	Men	Women	Men	Women	Athletes
Australia	Yes	Yes		Yes	28
Azerbaijan				Yes	4
Belgium		Yes			12
Brazil	Yes				12
Canada	Yes	Yes		Yes	28
China		Yes	Yes	Yes	20
France	Yes	Yes	Yes	Yes	32
Germany	Yes	Yes		Yes	28
Greece	Yes				12
Japan	Yes	Yes			24
Latvia			Yes		4
Lithuania			Yes		4
Netherlands			Yes		4
Nigeria		Yes			12
Poland			Yes		4
Puerto Rico	Yes	Yes			24
Serbia	Yes	Yes	Yes		28
South Sudan	Yes				12
Spain	Yes	Yes		Yes	28
United States	Yes	Yes	Yes	Yes	32
Total: 20 NOCs	144	144	32	32	352

== Competition schedule ==
Legend
G	Group stage	¼	Quarter-finals	½	Semi-finals	B	Bronze medal match	F	Gold medal match

Date Event	Sat 27	Sun 28	Mon 29	Tue 30	Wed 31	Thu 1	Fri 2	Sat 3		Sun 4		Mon 5			Tue 6	Wed 7	Thu 8	Fri 9	Sat 10		Sun 11	
Men	G	G		G	G		G	G							¼		½		B	F		
Women		G	G		G	G		G		G						¼		½			B	F
3x3 Men				G	G	G	G			G	¼	½	B	F								
3x3 Women				G	G	G	G	G	¼			½	B	F								

== 5x5 basketball ==
=== Qualification ===
The National Olympic Committees may enter only one 12-player men's team and only one 12-player women's team.

==== Men's qualification ====
Qualification method		Date	Venue	Berths	Qualified team
Host nation		—N/a	—N/a	1	France
2023 FIBA Basketball World Cup	Africa	25 August – 10 September 2023	Philippines; Indonesia; Japan	1	South Sudan
2023 FIBA Basketball World Cup	Americas	25 August – 10 September 2023	Philippines; Indonesia; Japan	2	Canada
2023 FIBA Basketball World Cup	Americas	25 August – 10 September 2023	Philippines; Indonesia; Japan	2	United States
2023 FIBA Basketball World Cup	Asia	25 August – 10 September 2023	Philippines; Indonesia; Japan	1	Japan
2023 FIBA Basketball World Cup	Europe	25 August – 10 September 2023	Philippines; Indonesia; Japan	2	Germany
2023 FIBA Basketball World Cup	Europe	25 August – 10 September 2023	Philippines; Indonesia; Japan	2	Serbia
2023 FIBA Basketball World Cup	Oceania	25 August – 10 September 2023	Philippines; Indonesia; Japan	1	Australia
2024 FIBA Men's Olympic Qualifying Tournaments		2–7 July 2024	(Spain) Valencia	1	Spain
2024 FIBA Men's Olympic Qualifying Tournaments		2–7 July 2024	(Latvia) Riga	1	Brazil
2024 FIBA Men's Olympic Qualifying Tournaments		2–7 July 2024	(Greece) Piraeus	1	Greece
2024 FIBA Men's Olympic Qualifying Tournaments		2–7 July 2024	(Puerto Rico) San Juan	1	Puerto Rico
Total				12	

==== Women's qualification ====
Qualification method	Date	Venue	Berths	Qualified team
Host nation	—N/a	—N/a	1	France
2022 FIBA Women's Basketball World Cup	22 September – 1 October 2022	(Australia) Sydney	1	United States
2024 FIBA Women's Olympic Qualifying Tournaments	8–11 February 2024	(China) Xi'an	2	China
2024 FIBA Women's Olympic Qualifying Tournaments	8–11 February 2024	(China) Xi'an	2	Puerto Rico
2024 FIBA Women's Olympic Qualifying Tournaments	8–11 February 2024	(Belgium) Antwerp	2	Belgium
2024 FIBA Women's Olympic Qualifying Tournaments	8–11 February 2024	(Belgium) Antwerp	2	Nigeria
2024 FIBA Women's Olympic Qualifying Tournaments	8–11 February 2024	(Brazil) Belém	3	Australia
2024 FIBA Women's Olympic Qualifying Tournaments	8–11 February 2024	(Brazil) Belém	3	Germany
2024 FIBA Women's Olympic Qualifying Tournaments	8–11 February 2024	(Brazil) Belém	3	Serbia
2024 FIBA Women's Olympic Qualifying Tournaments	8–11 February 2024	(Hungary) Sopron	3	Japan
2024 FIBA Women's Olympic Qualifying Tournaments	8–11 February 2024	(Hungary) Sopron	3	Spain
2024 FIBA Women's Olympic Qualifying Tournaments	8–11 February 2024	(Hungary) Sopron	3	Canada
Total			12	

=== Men's tournament ===
==== Preliminary round ====
===== Group A =====
Pos	Team	Pld	W	L	PF	PA	PD	Pts	Qualification
1	Canada	3	3	0	267	247	+20	6	Quarterfinals
2	Australia	3	1	2	246	250	−4	4 (Note: Australia 3 Pts, +6 PD; Greece 3 Pts, −1 PD; Spain 3 Pts, −5 PD.)	Quarterfinals
3	Greece	3	1	2	233	241	−8	4	Quarterfinals
4	Spain	3	1	2	249	257	−8	4	

Source: FIBA
Rules for classification: 1) classification points; 2) head-to-head results; 3) head-to-head game points difference; 4) head-to-head number of game points scored.

===== Group B =====
Pos	Team	Pld	W	L	PF	PA	PD	Pts	Qualification
1	Germany	3	3	0	268	221	+47	6	Quarterfinals
2	France (H)	3	2	1	243	241	+2	5	Quarterfinals
3	Brazil	3	1	2	241	248	−7	4	Quarterfinals
4	Japan	3	0	3	251	293	−42	3	

Source: FIBA
Rules for classification: 1) classification points; 2) head-to-head results; 3) head-to-head game points difference; 4) head-to-head number of game points scored.
(H) Hosts

===== Group C =====
Pos	Team	Pld	W	L	PF	PA	PD	Pts	Qualification
1	United States	3	3	0	317	253	+64	6	Quarterfinals
2	Serbia	3	2	1	287	261	+26	5	Quarterfinals
3	South Sudan	3	1	2	261	278	−17	4	
4	Puerto Rico	3	0	3	228	301	−73	3	

Source: FIBA
Rules for classification: 1) classification points; 2) head-to-head results; 3) head-to-head game points difference; 4) head-to-head number of game points scored.

===== Third-placed team rankings =====
Pos	Grp	Team	Pld	W	L	PF	PA	PD	Pts	Qualification
1	B	Brazil	3	1	2	241	248	−7	4	Quarterfinals
2	A	Greece	3	1	2	233	241	−8	4	Quarterfinals
3	C	South Sudan	3	1	2	261	278	−17	4	

Source: FIBA
Rules for classification: 1) classification points; 2) game points difference; 3) number of game points scored; 4) FIBA ranking.

==== Knockout stage ====
Quarterfinals
6 August
France	82
Canada	73
6 August
Germany	76
Greece	63
6 August
Brazil	87
United States	122
6 August
Serbia (OT)	95
Australia	90

Semifinals
8 August
France	73
Germany	69
8 August
United States	95
Serbia	91

Gold medal
10 August
France	87
United States	98
Bronze medal
10 August
Germany	83
Serbia	93

==== Final standings ====
Pos	Team	Pld	W	L
1st place, gold medalist(s)	United States	6	6	0
2nd place, silver medalist(s)	France	6	4	2
3rd place, bronze medalist(s)	Serbia	6	4	2
4	Germany	6	4	2
5	Canada	4	3	1
6	Australia	4	1	3
7	Brazil	4	1	3
8	Greece	4	1	3
9	South Sudan	3	1	2
10	Spain	3	1	2
11	Japan	3	0	3
12	Puerto Rico	3	0	3

Source: Olympics

==== Statistical leaders ====
Statistic	Name	Total	Per game/Pct.
Points	(Serbia) Nikola Jokić	113	18.8
Rebounds	(Serbia) Nikola Jokić	64	10.7
Assists	(Serbia) Nikola Jokić	52	8.7
Steals	3 players	12	2
Blocks	(France) Victor Wembanyama	10	2
3-point field goals	(United States) Stephen Curry	22	.478
Free throws	(Canada) Shai Gilgeous-Alexander	26	.722

=== Women's tournament ===
==== Preliminary round ====
===== Group A =====
Pos	Team	Pld	W	L	PF	PA	PD	Pts	Qualification
1	Spain	3	3	0	223	213	+10	6	Quarterfinals
2	Serbia	3	2	1	201	184	+17	5	Quarterfinals
3	China	3	1	2	228	229	−1	4	
4	Puerto Rico	3	0	3	175	201	−26	3	

Source: FIBA
Rules for classification: 1) classification points; 2) head-to-head results; 3) head-to-head game points difference; 4) head-to-head number of game points scored.

===== Group B =====
Pos	Team	Pld	W	L	PF	PA	PD	Pts	Qualification
1	France (H)	3	2	1	222	187	+35	5 (Note: France 3 Pts, +14 PD; Australia 3 Pts, −6 PD; Nigeria 3 Pts, −8 PD.)	Quarterfinals
2	Australia	3	2	1	211	212	−1	5	Quarterfinals
3	Nigeria	3	2	1	208	207	+1	5	Quarterfinals
4	Canada	3	0	3	189	224	−35	3	

Source: FIBA
Rules for classification: 1) classification points; 2) head-to-head results; 3) head-to-head game points difference; 4) head-to-head number of game points scored.
(H) Hosts

===== Group C =====
Pos	Team	Pld	W	L	PF	PA	PD	Pts	Qualification
1	United States	3	3	0	276	218	+58	6	Quarterfinals
2	Germany	3	2	1	226	220	+6	5	Quarterfinals
3	Belgium	3	1	2	228	228	0	4	Quarterfinals
4	Japan	3	0	3	198	262	−64	3	

Source: FIBA
Rules for classification: 1) classification points; 2) head-to-head results; 3) head-to-head game points difference; 4) head-to-head number of game points scored.

===== Third-placed team rankings =====
Pos	Grp	Team	Pld	W	L	PF	PA	PD	Pts	Qualification
1	B	Nigeria	3	2	1	208	207	+1	5	Quarterfinals
2	C	Belgium	3	1	2	228	228	0	4	Quarterfinals
3	A	China	3	1	2	228	229	−1	4	

Source: FIBA
Rules for classification: 1) classification points; 2) game points difference; 3) number of game points scored; 4) FIBA ranking.

==== Knockout stage ====
Quarterfinals
7 August
Germany	71
France	84
7 August
Spain	66
Belgium	79
7 August
Nigeria	74
United States	88
7 August
Serbia	67
Australia	85

Semifinals
9 August
France (OT)	81
Belgium	75
9 August
United States	85
Australia	64

Gold medal
11 August
France	66
United States	67
Bronze medal
11 August
Belgium	81
Australia	85

==== Final ranking ====
Pos	Team	Pld	W	L
1st place, gold medalist(s)	United States	6	6	0
2nd place, silver medalist(s)	France	6	4	2
3rd place, bronze medalist(s)	Australia	6	4	2
4	Belgium	6	2	4
5	Spain	4	3	1
6	Serbia	4	2	2
7	Germany	4	2	2
8	Nigeria	4	2	2
9	China	3	1	2
10	Puerto Rico	3	0	3
11	Canada	3	0	3
12	Japan	3	0	3

Source: Olympics

==== Statistical leaders ====
Statistic	Name	Total	Per game/Pct.
Points	(Belgium) Emma Meesseman	140	23.3
Rebounds	(United States) A'ja Wilson	61	10.2
Assists	(Belgium) Julie Vanloo	41	6.8
Steals	(France) Gabby Williams	17	2.8
Blocks	(United States) A'ja Wilson	16	2.7
3-point field goals	(Belgium) Julie Vanloo	15	.294
Free throws	(Nigeria) Ezinne Kalu	23	.821

== 3x3 basketball ==
=== Qualification ===
For the second time in history, the 3x3 basketball tournament features eight teams competing in the men's and women's events. The National Olympic Committees may enter only one 4-player men's team and only one 4-player women's team. Each team constitutes three players on the court and a single substitute.

==== Men's qualification ====
Qualification method	Date	Venue	Berths	Qualified team
Host nation	—N/a	—N/a	0	—N/a
FIBA 3x3 World Ranking	1 November 2023	—N/a	3	Serbia; United States; China
2024 FIBA Universality Olympic Qualifying Tournament 1	12–14 April 2024	Hong Kong	1	Latvia
2024 FIBA Universality Olympic Qualifying Tournament 2	3–5 May 2024	(Japan) Utsunomiya	1	Netherlands
2024 FIBA Olympic Qualifying Tournament	16–19 May 2024	(Hungary) Debrecen	3	France; Lithuania; Poland
Total			8	

==== Women's qualification ====
Qualification method	Date	Venue	Berths	Qualified team
Host nation	—N/a	—N/a	1	France
FIBA 3x3 World Ranking	1 November 2023	—N/a	2	China; United States
2024 FIBA Universality Olympic Qualifying Tournament 1	12–14 April 2024	Hong Kong	1	Azerbaijan
2024 FIBA Universality Olympic Qualifying Tournament 2	3–5 May 2024	(Japan) Utsunomiya	1	Australia
2024 FIBA Olympic Qualifying Tournament	16–19 May 2024	(Hungary) Debrecen	3	Germany; Spain; Canada
Total			8	

=== Men's tournament ===
==== Pool ====
Pos	Team	Pld	W	L	PF	PA	PD	Qualification
1	Latvia	7	7	0	147	103	+44	Semifinals
2	Netherlands	7	5	2	133	112	+21	Semifinals
3	Lithuania	7	4 (Note: Lithuania 20–18 Serbia)	3	134	125	+9	Play-ins
4	Serbia	7	4	3	129	123	+6	Play-ins
5	France (H)	7	3	4	131	132	−1	Play-ins
6	Poland	7	2 (Note: United States 17–19 Poland)	5	116	139	−23	Play-ins
7	United States	7	2	5	116	138	−22	
8	China	7	1	6	107	141	−34	

Source: FIBA
Rules for classification: 1) Wins; 2) Head-to-head record; 3) Points scored.
(H) Hosts

==== Knockout stage ====
Play-in
4 August
Serbia	19
France	22
4 August
Lithuania	21
Poland	15

Semifinals
5 August
Latvia	14
France	21
5 August
Netherlands	20
Lithuania	9

Gold medal
5 August
France	17
Netherlands (OT)	18
Bronze medal
5 August
Latvia	18
Lithuania	21

==== Final ranking ====
Pos	Team	Pld	W	L
1st place, gold medalist(s)	Netherlands	9	7	2
2nd place, silver medalist(s)	France	10	5	5
3rd place, bronze medalist(s)	Lithuania	10	6	4
4	Latvia	9	7	2
5	Serbia	8	4	4
6	Poland	8	2	6
7	United States	7	2	5
8	China	7	1	6

Source: Olympics

=== Women's tournament ===
==== Pool ====
Pos	Team	Pld	W	L	PF	PA	PD	Qualification
1	Germany	7	6	1	117	100	+17	Semifinals
2	Spain	7	4 (Note: Spain 2–1; United States 2–1; Canada 1–2; Australia 1–2. Sorted by points scored after first tie broken.)	3	115	114	+1	Semifinals
3	United States	7	4	3	108	109	−1	Play-ins
4	Canada	7	4	3	129	112	+17	Play-ins
5	Australia	7	4	3	127	122	+5	Play-ins
6	China	7	2 (Note: China 1–1; France 1–1; Azerbaijan 1–1. Sorted by points scored.)	5	107	123	−16	Play-ins
7	Azerbaijan	7	2	5	106	123	−17	
8	France (H)	7	2	5	99	105	−6	

Source: FIBA
Rules for classification: 1) Wins; 2) Head-to-head record; 3) Points scored.
(H) Hosts

==== Knockout stage ====
Play-in
3 August
Canada	21
Australia	10
3 August
United States	21
China	13

Semifinals
5 August
Germany	16
Canada	15
5 August
Spain (OT)	18
United States	16

Gold medal
5 August
Germany	17
Spain	16
Bronze medal
5 August
Canada	13
United States	16

==== Final ranking ====
Pos	Team	Pld	W	L
1st place, gold medalist(s)	Germany	9	8	1
2nd place, silver medalist(s)	Spain	9	5	4
3rd place, bronze medalist(s)	United States	10	6	4
4	Canada	10	5	5
5	Australia	8	4	4
6	China	8	2	6
7	Azerbaijan	7	2	5
8	France	7	2	5

Source: Olympics

== See also ==
- Basketball at the 2022 Asian Games
- Basketball at the 2023 Pan American Games
- Wheelchair basketball at the 2024 Summer Paralympics
