= Basketball at the 2024 Summer Olympics – Women's 3x3 tournament =

Tournament details
- Host country: France
- City: Paris
- Dates: 30 July – 5 August
- Teams: 8 (from 4 confederations)
- Venue: 1 (in 1 host city)

Final positions
- Champions: Germany (1st title)
- Runners-up: Spain
- Third place: United States
- Fourth place: Canada

Tournament statistics
- MVP: (Germany) Sonja Greinacher

The 2024 Summer Olympics women's 3x3 basketball tournament in Paris, France, began on 30 July and ended on 5 August 2024. All games were played at the Place de la Concorde. It was the second time the 3x3 basketball women's event was held at the Olympic Games.

Germany defeated Spain in the final to win their first title. The United States took home bronze after defeating Canada.

== Competition format ==
The eight teams played a round robin. The first and second placed teams qualified for the semi-finals. The teams three to six competed in play-in games for the remaining two spots in the semi-finals. After that, a knockout system was used. Additionally, the games could be won in two ways: by being the first team to score 21 points or having the highest score through 10 minutes.

== Qualification ==
Eight teams will participate in the women's basketball tournament, with each NOC sending a roster of three players and a substitute. The qualification process consisted of four phases one based in the FIBA ranking list and three olympic qualifiers:

- The first phase gave three quota places to the highest ranked National Olympic Committees (NOC) on the FIBA ranking list of 1 November. However, not more than two NOC's from a continent could qualify in this phase. Also a quota place was guaranteed to the host nation for only one of the 3x3 events which was given to the women's 3x3 tournament at the 2024 Summer Olympics.
- The second phase consisted of the first of three FIBA Universality-driven Olympic tournament where one quota place was awarded to the highest positioned NOC were the seven highest ranked NOCs that have not been qualified yet as well as France (for being the host nation) participated.
- The third phase was an Olympic tournament which awarded one place to the highest positioned team were the highest placed NOC's of each continental tournament and the hosts of both the tournament and the olympics, if not qualified, participated.
- The fourth phase saw the sixteen highest-ranked eligible NOCs based on the FIBA global standings, including the tournament host and host nation France, if not yet qualified, participated in another Olympic qualifier with the top three securing the remaining berths for Paris 2024.

| Qualification method | Date | Venue | Berths | Qualified team |
|---|---|---|---|---|
| Host nation | —N/a | —N/a | 1 | France |
| FIBA 3x3 World Ranking | 1 November 2023 | —N/a | 2 | China; United States |
| 2024 FIBA Universality Olympic Qualifying Tournament 1 | 12–14 April 2024 | Hong Kong | 1 | Azerbaijan |
| 2024 FIBA Universality Olympic Qualifying Tournament 2 | 3–5 May 2024 | (Japan) Utsunomiya | 1 | Australia |
| 2024 FIBA Olympic Qualifying Tournament | 16–19 May 2024 | (Hungary) Debrecen | 3 | Germany; Spain; Canada |
| Total | | | 8 | |

== Competition schedule ==
Legend
| G | Group stage | ¼ | Quarter-finals | ½ | Semi-finals | B | Bronze medal match | F | Gold medal match |

| Tue 30 | Wed 31 | Thu 1 | Fri 2 | Sat 3 | | Sun 4 | Mon 5 | | |
|---|---|---|---|---|---|---|---|---|---|
| G | G | G | G | G | ¼ | | ½ | B | F |

== Rosters ==
| Team | Players | | | |
|---|---|---|---|---|
| Australia | Alex Wilson | Marena Whittle | Anneli Maley | Lauren Mansfield |
| Azerbaijan | Dina Ulyanova | Tiffany Hayes | Alexandra Mollenhauer | Marcedes Walker |
| Canada | Michelle Plouffe | Katherine Plouffe | Kacie Bosch | Paige Crozon |
| China | Zhang Zhiting | Chen Mingling | Wan Ji Yuan | Wang Lili |
| France | Marie-Ève Paget | Myriam Djekoundade | Laëtitia Guapo | Hortense Limouzin |
| Germany | Marie Reichert | Elisa Mevius | Sonja Greinacher | Svenja Brunckhorst |
| Spain | Vega Gimeno | Sandra Ygueravide | Juana Camilión | Gracia Alonso de Armiño |
| United States | Dearica Hamby* | Cierra Burdick | Hailey Van Lith | Rhyne Howard |

In the United States team, Dearica Hamby replaced Cameron Brink on the roster after the latter tore her ACL during a WNBA game on June 18, 2024.

== Referees ==
The following referees were selected for the tournament.

- (China) Shi Qirong
- (France) Najib Chajiddine
- (Hong Kong) Edmond Ho
- (Hungary) Brigitta Csabai-Kaskötő
- (Poland) Marek Maliszewski
- (Romania) Vlad Ghizdareanu
- (Serbia) Jasmina Juras
- (South Korea) Kim Ga-in
- (Switzerland) Eric Bertrand
- (Switzerland) Markos Michaelides
- (United States) Deanna Jackson

== Pool ==
=== Standings ===
| Pos | Team | Pld | W | L | PF | PA | PD | Qualification |
|---|---|---|---|---|---|---|---|---|
| 1 | Germany | 7 | 6 | 1 | 117 | 100 | +17 | Semifinals |
| 2 | Spain | 7 | 4 (Note: Spain 2–1; United States 2–1; Canada 1–2; Australia 1–2. Sorted by points scored after first tie broken.) | 3 | 115 | 114 | +1 | Semifinals |
| 3 | United States | 7 | 4 | 3 | 108 | 109 | −1 | Play-ins |
| 4 | Canada | 7 | 4 | 3 | 129 | 112 | +17 | Play-ins |
| 5 | Australia | 7 | 4 | 3 | 127 | 122 | +5 | Play-ins |
| 6 | China | 7 | 2 (Note: China 1–1; France 1–1; Azerbaijan 1–1. Sorted by points scored.) | 5 | 107 | 123 | −16 | Play-ins |
| 7 | Azerbaijan | 7 | 2 | 5 | 106 | 123 | −17 | |
| 8 | France (H) | 7 | 2 | 5 | 99 | 105 | −6 | |

Source: FIBA
Rules for classification: 1) Wins; 2) Head-to-head record; 3) Points scored.
(H) Hosts

=== Results ===
All times are local (UTC+2).

30 July 2024
17:30

Boxscore

| Germany | 17–13 | United States |
| Pts: Greinacher, Reichert 5 | | Pts: Van Lith 6 |

Place de la Concorde, Paris
Referees: Markos Michaelides (SUI), Kim Ga-in (KOR)

30 July 2024
18:00

Boxscore

| Australia | 14–22 | Canada |
| Pts: Wilson 6 | | Pts: K. Plouffe 10 |

Place de la Concorde, Paris
Referees: Najib Chajiddine (FRA), Shi Qirong (CHN)

30 July 2024
21:00

Boxscore

| Spain | 18–16 | Azerbaijan |
| Pts: Gimeno, Alonso de Armiño 5 | | Pts: Hayes 10 |

Place de la Concorde, Paris
Referees: Edmond Ho (HKG), Dorothy Okatch (BOT)

30 July 2024
21:30

Boxscore

| France | 19–21 | China |
| Pts: Limouzin 6 | | Pts: Chen 10 |

Place de la Concorde, Paris
Referees: Deanna Jackson (USA), Brigitta Csabai-Kaskötő (HUN)

31 July 2024
17:30

Boxscore

| Germany | 19–21 | Australia |
| Pts: Greinacher 9 | | Pts: Whittle 9 |

Place de la Concorde, Paris
Referees: Marek Maliszewski (POL), Dorothy Okatch (BOT)

31 July 2024
18:00

Boxscore

| Canada | 21–11 | China |
| Pts: Crozon, M. Plouffe 7 | | Pts: Chen 5 |

Place de la Concorde, Paris
Referees: Deanna Jackson (USA), Najib Chajiddine (FRA)

31 July 2024
21:00

Boxscore

| France | 12–17 | Spain |
| Pts: four players 3 | | Pts: Ygueravide 9 |

Place de la Concorde, Paris
Referees: Shi Qirong (CHN), Kim Ga-in (KOR)

31 July 2024
21:30

Boxscore

| United States | 17–20 | Azerbaijan |
| Pts: Hamby 7 | | Pts: Hayes 11 |

Place de la Concorde, Paris
Referees: Jasmina Juras (SRB), Kim Ga-in (KOR)

1 August 2024
09:00

Boxscore

| China | 15–21 | Australia |
| Pts: Wang 5 | | Pts: Wilson 11 |

Place de la Concorde, Paris
Referees: Deanna Jackson (USA), Brigitta Csabai-Kaskötő (HUN)

1 August 2024
09:30

Boxscore

| Germany | 19–15 | Canada |
| Pts: Greinacher 8 | | Pts: K. Plouffe, M. Plouffe 5 |

Place de la Concorde, Paris
Referees: Jasmina Juras (SRB), Dorothy Okatch (BOT)

1 August 2024
12:30

Boxscore

| Azerbaijan | 10–15 | France |
| Pts: Hayes 5 | | Pts: Limouzin 5 |

Place de la Concorde, Paris
Referees: Dorothy Okatch (BOT), Markos Michaelides (SUI)

1 August 2024
13:00

Boxscore

| United States | 15–17 | Australia |
| Pts: Howard 8 | | Pts: Wilson 8 |

Place de la Concorde, Paris
Referees: Brigitta Csabai-Kaskötő (HUN), Jasmina Juras (SRB)

1 August 2024
18:00

Boxscore

| China | 14–11 | Spain |
| Pts: Wang 5 | | Pts: Camilión 7 |

Place de la Concorde, Paris
Referees: Vlad Ghizdareanu (ROU), Marek Maliszewski (POL)

1 August 2024
18:30

Boxscore

| Germany | 12–8 | Azerbaijan |
| Pts: Brunckhorst, Reichert 4 | | Pts: Mollenhauer 4 |

Place de la Concorde, Paris
Referees: Kim Ga-in (KOR), Edmond Ho (HKG)

1 August 2024
21:30

Boxscore

| Spain | 11–17 | United States |
| Pts: Gimeno 5 | | Pts: Howard, Van Lith 5 |

Place de la Concorde, Paris
Referees: Shi Qirong (CHN), Marek Maliszewski (POL)

1 August 2024
22:00

Boxscore

| Canada | 13–9 | France |
| Pts: Crozon, K. Plouffe 4 | | Pts: Limouzin 4 |

Place de la Concorde, Paris
Referees: Kim Ga-in (KOR), Shi Qirong (CHN)

2 August 2024
09:00

Boxscore

| China | 15–18 | Germany |
| Pts: Chen 6 | | Pts: Reichert 7 |

Place de la Concorde, Paris
Referees: Marek Maliszewski (POL), Dorothy Okatch (BOT)

2 August 2024
09:30

Boxscore

| Australia | 21–12 | Azerbaijan |
| Pts: Whittle 8 | | Pts: Hayes 6 |

Place de la Concorde, Paris
Referees: Deanna Jackson (USA), Dorothy Okatch (BOT)

2 August 2024
12:30

Boxscore

| Australia | 17–21 | Spain |
| Pts: Whittle 7 | | Pts: Gimeno, Ygueravide 9 |

Place de la Concorde, Paris
Referees: Marek Maliszewski (POL), Deanna Jackson (USA)

2 August 2024
13:00

Boxscore

| United States | 14–13 | France |
| Pts: three players 4 | | Pts: Guapo 5 |

Place de la Concorde, Paris
Referees: Brigitta Csabai-Kaskötő (HUN), Marek Maliszewski (POL)

2 August 2024
17:30

Boxscore

| Azerbaijan | 21–19 (OT) | China |
| Pts: Hayes 11 | | Pts: Chen 8 |

Place de la Concorde, Paris
Referees: Markos Michaelides (SUI), Kim Ga-in (KOR)

2 August 2024
18:00

Boxscore

| United States | 18–17 (OT) | Canada |
| Pts: Howard 7 | | Pts: K. Plouffe 10 |

Place de la Concorde, Paris
Referees: Kim Ga-in (KOR), Najib Chajiddine (FRA)

2 August 2024
21:00

Boxscore

| Canada | 20–22 (OT) | Spain |
| Pts: M. Plouffe 11 | | Pts: Ygueravide 10 |

Place de la Concorde, Paris
Referees: Shi Qirong (CHN), Markos Michaelides (SUI)

2 August 2024
21:30

Boxscore

| France | 13–14 | Germany |
| Pts: Guapo 4 | | Pts: Greinacher 7 |

Place de la Concorde, Paris
Referees: Shi Qirong (CHN), Vlad Ghizdareanu (ROU)

3 August 2024
17:30

Boxscore

| Azerbaijan | 19–21 | Canada |
| Pts: Hayes 9 | | Pts: M. Plouffe 8 |

Place de la Concorde, Paris
Referees: Dorothy Okatch (BOT), Edmond Ho (HKG)

3 August 2024
18:00

Boxscore

| Spain | 15–18 | Germany |
| Pts: Alonso de Armiño 5 | | Pts: Greinacher, Reichert 5 |

Place de la Concorde, Paris
Referees: Najib Chajiddine (FRA), Shi Qirong (CHN)

3 August 2024
18:35

Boxscore

| France | 18–16 (OT) | Australia |
| Pts: Guapo 7 | | Pts: Whittle 8 |

Place de la Concorde, Paris
Referees: Marek Maliszewski (POL), Kim Ga-in (KOR)

3 August 2024
19:05

Boxscore

| China | 12–14 | United States |
| Pts: Wan, Zhang 4 | | Pts: Van Lith 6 |

Place de la Concorde, Paris
Referees: Markos Michaelides (SUI), Vlad Ghizdareanu (ROU)

== Knockout stage ==
=== Bracket ===
Play-in
3 August
Canada | 21
Australia | 10
3 August
United States | 21
China | 13

Semifinals
5 August
Germany | 16
Canada | 15
5 August
Spain (OT) | 18
United States | 16

Gold medal
5 August
Germany | 17
Spain | 16
Bronze medal
5 August
Canada | 13
United States | 16

=== Play-in ===
3 August 2024
21:30

Boxscore

| Canada | 21–10 | Australia |
| Pts: Bosch 9 | | Pts: Maley 5 |

Place de la Concorde, Paris
Referees: Najib Chajiddine (FRA), Deanna Jackson (USA)

3 August 2024
22:05

Boxscore

| United States | 21–13 | China |
| Pts: Hamby 9 | | Pts: Chen, Wan 4 |

Place de la Concorde, Paris
Referees: Markos Michaelides (SUI), Kim Ga-in (KOR)

=== Semifinals ===
5 August 2024
17:30

Boxscore

| Spain | 18–16 (OT) | United States |
| Pts: Ygueravide 9 | | Pts: Van Lith 8 |

Place de la Concorde, Paris
Referees: Shi Qirong (CHN), Marek Maliszewski (POL)

5 August 2024
18:30

Boxscore

| Germany | 16–15 | Canada |
| Pts: Greinacher 11 | | Pts: three players 4 |

Place de la Concorde, Paris
Referees: Jasmina Juras (SRB), Najib Chajiddine (FRA)

=== Bronze medal game ===
5 August 2024
21:00

Boxscore

| Canada | 13–16 | United States |
| Pts: K. Plouffe 5 | | Pts: Van Lith 6 |

Place de la Concorde, Paris
Referees: Najib Chajiddine (FRA), Shi Qirong (CHN)

=== Gold medal game ===
5 August 2024
22:00

Boxscore

| Germany | 17–16 | Spain |
| Pts: Greinacher 5 | | Pts: Camilión 6 |

Place de la Concorde, Paris
Referees: Edmond Ho (HKG), Brigitta Csabai-Kaskötő (HUN)

== Final ranking ==
| Pos | Team | Pld | W | L |
|---|---|---|---|---|
| 1st place, gold medalist(s) | Germany | 9 | 8 | 1 |
| 2nd place, silver medalist(s) | Spain | 9 | 5 | 4 |
| 3rd place, bronze medalist(s) | United States | 10 | 6 | 4 |
| 4 | Canada | 10 | 5 | 5 |
| 5 | Australia | 8 | 4 | 4 |
| 6 | China | 8 | 2 | 6 |
| 7 | Azerbaijan | 7 | 2 | 5 |
| 8 | France | 7 | 2 | 5 |

Source: Olympics

== Statistics and awards ==
=== Points leaders ===
| Rank | Name | Points |
|---|---|---|
| 1 | (Germany) Sonja Greinacher | 56 |
| 2 | (Azerbaijan) Tiffany Hayes | 54 |
| 2 | (Canada) Katherine Plouffe | 54 |
| 4 | (Canada) Michelle Plouffe | 52 |
| 5 | (Australia) Alex Wilson | 50 |
| 5 | (Spain) Sandra Ygueravide | 50 |

=== Awards ===
The awards were announced on 7 August 2024.

All-Star team
(Germany) Sonja Greinacher
(Spain) Sandra Ygueravide
(United States) Hailey Van Lith
MVP
(Germany) Sonja Greinacher
