= West High School (Knoxville, Tennessee) =

Location
- 3300 Sutherland Avenue; Knoxville, Tennessee 37919; United States; 35°56′56″N 83°58′25″W

Information
- Established: 1951
- School district: Knox County Schools
- Principal: Spencer Long
- Teaching staff: 87.57 (FTE)
- Enrollment: 1,478 (2022-23)
- Student to teacher ratio: 16.88
- Colors: Red, Navy Blue, White
- Mascot: Rebels
- Nickname: Rebels
- Website: www.knoxschools.org/wesths

West High School, also known as Knoxville West High School, is a public high school in the Knox County school district located at 3300 Sutherland Avenue in Knoxville, Tennessee. The feeder schools are Bearden Middle, Northwest Middle, and West Valley Middle. With the school colors of red and blue, the West High Rebels compete in various sports competitions in their district.

== History ==
Knoxville West High School (West) is one of the fifteen area public high schools in the Knox County School District. The school opened its doors in 1951 on the original site of the McGhee Tyson Airport. West was one of four high schools, along with East (now Austin-East), South (now South-Doyle), and Fulton, that opened when Knoxville High School closed. Originally built to accommodate 850 students, West has undergone two major renovations and accommodates 1,300 students. The school is situated in the midtown area within five miles of the University of Tennessee.

== Demographics ==
The demographic breakdown of the 1,478 students enrolled for the 2022-2023 school year was:

- Male - 50.0%
- Female - 50.0%
- Native Hawaiian/Pacific Islander - 0.1%
- Asian - 1.8%
- Black - 20.4%
- Hispanic - 13.3%
- White - 58.1%
- Multiracial - 6.3%
- Verity- 6.7%

In addition, 20.6% of the students were eligible for free or reduced lunch.

== Athletics ==
WHS students have the opportunity to participate in the following sports: soccer, baseball, basketball, softball, football, track, cross country, cheerleading, volleyball, dance, wrestling, swim and dive, tennis, golf, lacrosse and marching band.

The West High School football team won the Tennessee state championship in 2014, 2022, and 2023.They won nationals in 2026.

== Notable alumni ==
- Gracia Alonso de Armiño, member of the Spain women's national 3x3 team at the 2024 Summer Olympics
- Henry Cho, comedian
- Nathan Cottrell, former NFL running back for the Jacksonville Jaguars
- Don Everly and Phil Everly, the Everly Brothers
- Bobby Ogdin, recording session pianist, member of Elvis Presley's TCB Band, the Marshall Tucker Band and Ween
- Steven Pearl, head coach, Auburn University men's basketball
- Lowell "Chuck" Ramsey, former punter for the West High Rebels, Wake Forest Demon Deacons and the New York Jets from 1977 to 1984
- Jami Rogers-Anderson, opera singer
- Benjamin "Coach" Wade, three-time Survivor contestant, Survivor: South Pacific runner-up in 2011
- Julia Stowers, Gold medalist in Swimming at the 2000 Summer Olympics – Women's 4 × 200 metre freestyle relay
