= Michelle Plouffe =

Canadian basketball player

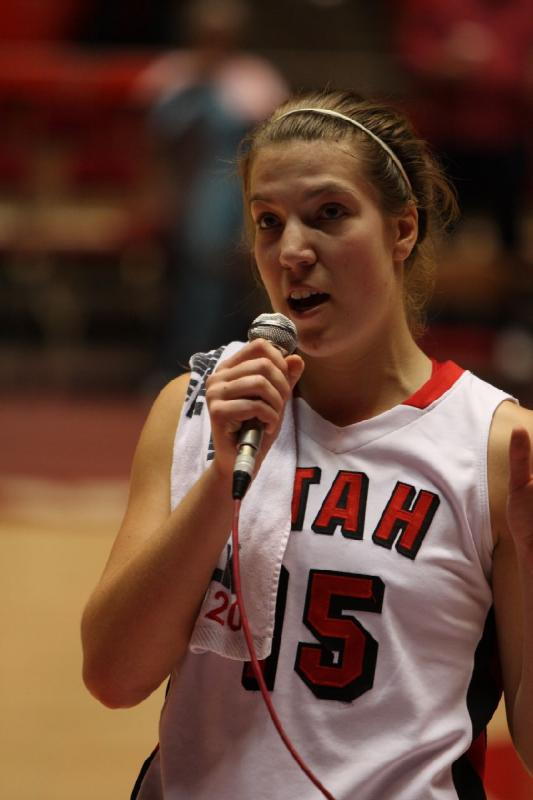

Lyon ASVEL
- Position: Forward
- League: LFB

Personal information
- Born: September 15, 1992 (age 34) Edmonton, Alberta, Canada
- Listed height: 6 ft 3 in (1.91 m)
- Listed weight: 181 lb (82 kg)

Career information
- High school: Harry Ainlay (Edmonton, Alberta)
- College: Utah (2010–2014)
- WNBA draft: 2014: 2nd round, 19th overall pick
- Drafted by: Seattle Storm
- Playing career: 2014–present

Career highlights
- 2× All Pac-12 (2013, 2014)
- Stats at Basketball Reference
Medals
Representing Canada
Women's basketball
Pan American Games
Gold medal – first place	2015 Toronto	Team
FIBA Women's AmeriCup
Gold medal – first place	2015 Edmonton
Gold medal – first place	2017 Buenos Aires
Women's 3x3 basketball
FIBA 3x3 World Cup
Silver medal – second place	2022 Antwerp
FIBA 3x3 AmeriCup
Gold medal – first place	2022 Miami
Gold medal – first place	2026 San Salvador
Bronze medal – third place	2021 Miami

Michelle Plouffe (born September 15, 1992) is a Canadian basketball player for Lyon ASVEL Féminin. She played for the Canada women's national basketball team at the 2012 London Olympics and the 2016 Rio Olympics, as well as the Canada women's national 3x3 team at the 2024 Paris Olympics. She is 1.91 m (6 ft 3 in) tall.

== College career ==
After graduating from Harry Ainlay High School in Edmonton, Alberta, Plouffe committed to play at Utah. As a freshman, Plouffe appeared in all 35 games, starting all but one. She averaged 13.7 points and 7.3 rebounds per game, earning the Mountain West Freshman of the Year award and was named second-team all-conference.

Ahead of her sophomore year, Utah moved from the Mountain West to the Pac-12 Conference. Plouffe started all 32 games, averaging 14.1 points and 8.2 rebounds, notably recording a double-double against Washington in the 2012 WNIT. She was named to the honourable mention Associated Press All-American, honorable mention all-conference, and media all-conference teams.

As a junior, Plouffe was again named an honourable mention AP All-American and media all-conference, but earned all-conference and honorable mention conference all-defensive nods. She ranked fourth and fifth in the conference in points and rebounds per game, respectively. She was named to the all-WNIT team, setting a WNIT record with 83 rebounds in the tournament, where they lost in the championship to Drexel.

Plouffe averaged a double-double her senior season and was named to the all-conference and conference all-defensive teams. She scored a career-high 31 points in back-to-back games against Washington State and Washington.

At the end of her collegiate career, Plouffe held the school record from rebounds with 1,155.

== Professional career ==
Plouffe was drafted in the second round of the 2014 WNBA draft with the 19th pick by the Seattle Storm. On May 14, a month after the draft, Plouffe was waived by the team.

== International career ==
=== Basketball ===
While in high school, Plouffe played on the Canada women's national under-19 basketball team at the 2009 FIBA Under-19 World Championship for Women held in Thailand. She averaged 6 points and 4.2 rebounds per game, helping Canada to a fourth-place finish.

She also played for Canada at the 2010 FIBA Americas U18 Championship held in Colorado Springs, Colorado. She led the team in points, averaging 14.4 points and 9.4 rebounds per game, helping the team to a third-place finish.

In 2012, she was named to the senior national team which competed at the 2012 Olympics in London. The team lost in the quarterfinals to the United States; Plouffe appeared in two games, including the quarterfinal, recording two points and one rebound.

Plouffe was again named to the national team ahead of the 2014 FIBA World Championship for Women; Plouffe averaged 5.4 points and 3.4 rebounds and the team took fifth place.

In 2015, Plouffe played in her first Pan American Games, hosted in Toronto. At the event, Canada won all five of their games, taking the gold medal with an 81–73 victory over the United States. Plouffe averaged 2.4 points and 1.8 rebounds en route to her first gold medal. Plouffe also competed at the 2015 FIBA Americas Women's Championship in her hometown of Edmonton, appearing in five of the team's six games. Canada defeated Cuba 82–66 to win their second gold medal of the year.

In 2016, Plouffe was named to her second Olympic team to compete in the 2016 Summer Olympics in Rio de Janeiro. She appeared in three games and Canada was eliminated in the quarterfinals for the second straight Olympics.

In 2017, Plouffe competed in her third FIBA Americas Championship, now called the Women's AmeriCup. at the 2017 AmeriCup in Buenos Aires, Plouffe averaged 5.3 points and 6.3 rebounds per game, the latter of which was her senior team career-high. Canada won the gold medal with a 67–65 win over host country Argentina.

=== 3x3 basketball ===
In 2019, Plouffe left 5-on-5 professional and international basketball to focus on 3x3 basketball. Her first major 3x3 event was representing Canada at the 2021 FIBA 3x3 AmeriCup in Miami as the top seed. The squad went undefeated in the group stage and won their quarterfinal game before losing to Brazil in the semifinals. They defeated Puerto Rico to win the bronze medal.

Plouffe played in Canada's first 3x3 World Cup appearance at the 2022 edition in Antwerp alongside her twin sister Katherine. The team made it out of the group stage and upset top-seeded Germany in the first round of the knockouts. After wins over the United States and Lithuania, Canada lost to France in the finals to take home silver. Plouffe was named to the tournament All-Star team after scoring 42 total points. Canada returned to the AmeriCup in 2022 in Miami, losing their opening game to Brazil before winning their next five, including the finals over Brazil to win the country's first 3x3 AmeriCup gold medal. Plouffe was named MVP of the tournament, leading the tournament in highlights and key assists.

At the 2023 FIBA 3x3 World Cup in Vienna, Canada won their group before being upset in the quarterfinals by France, their second consecutive loss to the country, to place sixth.

Canada took third in the FIBA Olympic Qualifying Tournament to qualify for the 2024 Summer Olympics, Plouffe's third Olympics and first on the 3x3 team.

== Personal life ==
Plouffe has four siblings; her twin sister, Katherine, played basketball at Marquette and plays on the national 3x3 team and her older sister, Andrea, played basketball at Washington.

== College statistics ==
Legend
GP	Games played	GS	Games started	MPG	Minutes per game
FG%	Field goal percentage	3P%	3-point field goal percentage	FT%	Free throw percentage
RPG	Rebounds per game	APG	Assists per game	SPG	Steals per game
BPG	Blocks per game	PPG	Points per game	**Bold**	Career high

Year	GP	GS	MPG	FG%	3P%	FT%	RPG	APG	SPG	BPG	PPG
2010–11	**35**	**34**	29.5	**0.431**	0.261	0.755	7.3	0.8	1.2	1.2	13.7
2011–12	32	32	33.9	0.389	0.306	**0.777**	8.2	1.8	1.3	**1.4**	14.1
2012–13	31	31	33.8	0.394	**0.346**	0.728	8.5	**2.7**	2.0	1.3	16.7
2013–14	29	28	**34.9**	0.406	0.309	0.699	**10.6**	2.6	**2.1**	0.8	**18.4**
Total	127	125	32.9	0.401	0.309	0.734	8.6	1.9	1.6	1.2	15.6
