= Cellular Sales =

American mobile phone retailer

- Type: Private
- Industry: Retail
- Founded: 1993; 33 years ago Knoxville, Tennessee, U.S.
- Headquarters: Knoxville, Tennessee, U.S.
- Key people: Dane Scism CEO; Margaret Scism President
- Number of employees: 7,200

Cellular Sales is an American wireless retailer based in Knoxville, Tennessee. It is an authorized agent for Verizon Wireless. Cellular Sales operates more than 745 retail stores across 42 states in the U.S. The company was ranked on Inc. Magazine's Inc 5000 list nine times. It is valued at more than $2 billion and projected a new store opening every three days in 2019.

== Company history ==
In the early 1990s, Cellular Sales opened a retail kiosk in a mall in Knoxville, Tennessee. Dane and Margaret Scism purchased Cellular Sales for $14,000 in 1993 using his last commission check for the assets of the company. By the end of Scism's first year as owner, the company had around 10 stores. The main cellphone store was based in Knoxville on Kingston Pike. In 1996, the company bought out one of its contract partners, Mike Collins, and added its 4th and 5th locations. Cellular Sales continued to grow through the late 1990s and early 2000s by making its original independent sales representatives partners in new territory markets it opened.

Cellular Sales marketed service on behalf of Cellular One and GTE Wireless prior to the advent of Verizon Wireless in April 2000. In 2009, the company opened 68 new stores across the country. Following its rapid growth, Cellular Sales was named to Inc. Magazine’s Inc. 5000 list of the nation’s fastest-growing companies, and was featured nine times from 2008 to 2017. The company opened its 300th store in Blount County, Tennessee in April 2010.

Cellular Sales made $488.5 million in revenue in 2010. The following year, the company opened its 400th store, in Hope Mills, North Carolina. In 2012, following a 242% growth over a 36-month period, marked by a revenue increase of $207.3 million to $708.6 million. In 2013, the company’s revenue was over $1 billion.

In December 2015, the Cellular Sales consolidated four of its five Knoxville-area locations into one corporate headquarters. The building houses 350 of the company’s employees and includes a call center with 140 employees. In 2017, the headquarters underwent a remodel and expansion. At that time, the company was hiring 300 new employees each month, nationwide.

In August 2016, Cellular Sales expanded its presence into California with a location in Goleta, and a second California store in Fresno that same month. Its first store in Idaho opened in Coeur d'Alene in September 2016. By 2019, Cellular Sales reported that its revenue had exceeded $2 billion, while averaging a new store opening every three days.

== Philanthropy ==
In 2010, Cellular Sales joined Cell Phones For Soldiers to distribute free calling cards to U.S. Soldiers overseas. Cellular Sales donated $15,000 to SOAR Youth Ministries, a nonprofit serving at-risk youth, in 2012. The company has also sponsored the annual SOAR Golf Tournament. Also in 2012, Cellular Sales offered free cell and internet service for Kentucky and Indiana storm victims. The company donated $45,000 in September of the same year to Great School Partnership to help fund programs in Knox County Schools. The donation went toward the Verizon Cellular Sales Center for Academic Excellence at West High School, a tutoring center to help students complete credits to graduate and prepare for the ACT.
