= Seljan Mahsudova =

Azerbaijani trampoline gymnast

- Alternative name: Selcan Mahsudova
- Born: 28 August 2003 (age 23)
- Relatives: Maqsud Mahsudov (brother)

Gymnastics career
- Discipline: Trampoline gymnastics
- Country represented: Azerbaijan
- Gym: Baku Gymnastics School
- Head coach: Uladzimir Shulikin
Medal record
Women's trampoline gymnastics
Representing Azerbaijan
World Championships
Silver medal – second place	2026 Nanjing	Mixed synchro
Bronze medal – third place	2025 Pamplona	Mixed synchro

Seljan Mahsudova (born 28 August 2003) is an Azerbaijani trampoline gymnast. She represented Azerbaijan at the 2024 Summer Olympics and is the country's first Olympian in trampoline. She won a bronze medal in the inaugural mixed synchro competition at the 2025 World Championships.

== Early life ==
Mahsudova was born in 2003. Her younger brother, Maqsud Mahsudov, also competes internationally in trampolining.

== Gymnastics career ==
Mahsudova won a bronze medal in the 13-14 age category at the 2017 Open Slavic Games. Then at the 2017 World Age Group Competitions, she placed 15th in the individual event. She also competed in the double mini trampoline competition and placed sixth. She was the first Azerbaijani gymnast to compete in trampoline and double mini at the World Age Group Competitions.

Mahsudova won a silver medal in the 15-16 age category at the 2018 Ajara International Gymnastics Cup. She placed fifth in the double mini competition at the 2018 European Championships. Then at the 2018 World Age Group Competitions, she placed 11th in both individual trampolining and double mini.

Mahsudova finished sixth at the 2019 Belarus Open Championships, and she placed fourth at the Russian Open Championships. She also placed fourth at the 2019 World Age Group Competitions in the 15-16 age group.

Mahsudova competed at the senior level for the first time at the 2020 Baku World Cup and finished 32nd. She competed at the 2020 Dutch Trampoline Open, an online competition, and won the silver medal. She placed fifth at the 2021 Belarus Cup. Then at the online Trampoline Hopes Cup, she won the bronze medal in the senior competition. At the 2021 European Championships in Sochi, she became the first Azerbaijani female trampolinist to compete in a European final, finishing in sixth place. Then at the Turkish Open Championships, she won the gold medal in the individual event. She then competed at the 2021 World Age Group Competitions held in Baku, and she placed fourth in this competition for the second consecutive time.

Mahsudova won the individual silver medal at the 2022 Baku World Cup. This marked the first time an Azerbaijani female trampoline gymnast won an FIG World Cup medal. She finished 18th in the semifinal at the 2022 World Championships. She won a bronze medal in the individual event at the 2023 Baku World Cup. Then at the 2023 World Championships, she finished 21st in the qualification round.

At the 2024 Alkmaar World Cup, Mahsudova scored a perfect 10 in horizontal displacement and received the gold medal with her total score- her first major international gold medal. She then placed fourth at the Arosa World Cup. With these results, Mahsudova qualified for the 2024 Summer Olympics, becoming the first-ever trampoline gymnast from Azerbaijan to do so. She then placed fourth at the 2024 European Championships.

At the 2025 World Championships, Mahsudova competed alongside her brother in the first-ever mixed synchro event, and they won the bronze medal.

In October 2026, Seljan Makhsudova, having scored 55.540 points in the individual program, won a gold medal at the World Cup in Cottbus, Germany.

In November 2026, Seljan and Maksud Makhsudov won a silver medal at the World Trampoline and Tumbling Championships, which took place in Nanjing, China.
