= Maqsud Mahsudov =

Azerbaijani athlete

Personal information
- Born: 2 June 2007 (age 18)
- Relative: Seljan Mahsudova (sister)

Sport
- Sport: Trampolining

Maqsud Mahsudov (born 2 June 2007) is an Azerbaijani athlete who competes in trampoline gymnastics.

== Early life ==
Mahsudov was born in 2007. His older sister, Seljan Mahsudova, also competes internationally in trampolining.

== Sporting career ==
Mahsudov is a member of the Azerbaijani national trampoline gymnastics team. In 2019, he won a medal at the World Age Group Competitions in Trampoline Gymnastics in Tokyo. In 2021, he competed in the 28th Trampoline Gymnastics World Age Group Competitions. He became Junior Men's Champion in the 2022 Junior European Trampoline Championships. In October 2025, he won a gold medal at the CIS Games. He won a bronze medal in the 2025 Trampoline Gymnastics World Championships.

== Awards ==
Trampoline Gymnastics World Championships
2025	Pamplona (Spain)	Bronze	Synchro
Junior European Trampoline Championships
2021	Sochi (Russia)	Silver	Synchro
2022	Rimini (Italy)	Gold	Individual Trampoline
