= Nathan Cottrell =

American football player (born 1996)

No. 31
- Position: Running back

Personal information
- Born: August 2, 1996 (age 30); Knoxville, Tennessee, U.S.
- Listed height: 5 ft 11 in (1.80 m)
- Listed weight: 193 lb (88 kg)

Career information
- High school: Knoxville West
- College: Georgia Tech
- NFL draft: 2020: undrafted

Career history
- Jacksonville Jaguars (2020–2021)

Career NFL statistics
- Rushing attempts: 1
- Rushing yards: 3
- Return yards: 123
- Stats at Pro Football Reference

Nathan Cottrell (born August 2, 1996) is an American former professional football player who was a running back for the Jacksonville Jaguars of the National Football League (NFL). Cottrell played college football for the Georgia Tech Yellow Jackets.

== Early life ==
Cottrell played high school football at Knoxville West High School.

== College career ==
Cottrell played college football at Georgia Tech. During his senior season under head coach Geoff Collins, Cottrell mostly played special teams, particularly as a gunner on punts and kickoffs. He finished the season with nine total tackles. He was also switched from running back, which he played in the triple option offense under previous head coach Paul Johnson, to slot receiver.

== Professional career ==
Cottrell went undrafted in the 2020 NFL draft. During Georgia Tech's pro day, he had a 4.38 seconds 40-yard dash time. He reached a deal with the Jacksonville Jaguars on April 25, 2020. He was waived during final roster cuts on September 5, 2020, and signed to the team's practice squad two days later. He was elevated to the Jaguars' active roster just before the team's season opener against the Indianapolis Colts, and reverted to the practice squad after the game. He was placed on the practice squad/COVID-19 list by the team on October 17, 2020, and was restored to the practice squad on October 22. He was elevated to the active roster again on November 21 for the team's week 11 game against the Pittsburgh Steelers, and reverted to the practice squad again following the game. He was signed to the active roster on November 24.

On August 31, 2021, Cottrell was waived by the Jaguars and re-signed to the practice squad the next day. He was released on September 6, 2021, and re-signed with their practice squad on September 20, 2021. He signed a reserve/future contract on January 10, 2022. He was waived on August 7, 2022.

Cottrell has since retired from professional football and is currently a real estate agent.
