= Basketball at the 2024 Summer Olympics – Women's 3x3 qualification =

The women's 3x3 qualification for the Olympic basketball tournament took place between November 2022 and June 2024, allocating eight teams for the final tournament.

Three quota places were awarded to the top-ranked teams, including the host nation France, based on the total points calculated in the FIBA 3x3 Rankings of 1 November 2023, with the remainder attributed to the eligible National Olympic Committees (NOCs) in separate wildcard tournaments (two winners of the universality-driven Olympic qualifying tournaments and the top three of the FIBA Olympic Qualifying Tournament).

== Method ==
Eight teams participated in the women's basketball tournament, with each NOC sending a roster of three players and a substitute.

=== Host nation ===
As the host nation, France reserved a quota place in the men's 3x3 basketball subject to the FIBA 3x3 Ranking of 1 November 2023. If the host country failed to enter the team within the ranking list, the number of teams qualified through the regular process would be increased accordingly.

=== Qualification via world rankings ===
Similar to the 2021 format, the top three teams (two if France obtained the host quota place in the women's tournament) on the FIBA 3x3 women's basketball ranking list on 1 November 2023, qualified for the Olympics. These rankings were also used to determine entrants to both the OQT and UOQT.

=== Qualification via the wild card tournaments ===
The five remaining quota places were attributed to the eligible NOCs, including the host nation France if unqualified, through three separate wildcard tournaments: two universality-driven Olympic qualifying tournaments (UOQT) and the FIBA Olympic qualifying tournament (OQT). Teams were selected based on the following criteria:

- UOQT 1 – The top eight eligible NOCs, including the tournament host, from the FIBA world ranking list, participated in the first leg of the UOQT with the winner obtaining a direct spot for Paris 2024.
- UOQT 2 – The highest-ranked eligible NOC in the standings from each of the 2023 FIBA Continental Cup (Asia and Oceania, Americas, Europe, and Africa), the tournament host vying for qualification, and the host nation France, if unqualified, participated in the second leg of the UOQT with the winner obtaining a direct spot for Paris 2024. If the eight-team roster remained vacant, teams would be selected from a maximum of eight highest-ranked eligible NOCs based on the standings from 2023 FIBA 3x3 World Cup.
- OQT – The sixteen highest-ranked eligible NOCs based on the FIBA global standings, including the tournament host and host nation France, if unqualified, participated in the FIBA OQT with the top three securing the remaining berths for Paris 2024. The sixteen-team roster in the OQT had to field a minimum of two NOCs to a maximum of ten from the same continental zone (Asia and Oceania, Americas, Europe, and Africa).

== Qualified teams ==
Qualification method	Date	Venue	Berths	Qualified team
Host nation	—	—	1	France
FIBA 3x3 World Ranking	1 November 2023	—	2	China; United States
2024 FIBA Universality Olympic Qualifying Tournament 1	12–14 April 2024	Hong Kong	1	Azerbaijan
2024 FIBA Universality Olympic Qualifying Tournament 2	3–5 May 2024	(Japan) Utsunomiya	1	Australia
2024 FIBA Olympic Qualifying Tournament	16–19 May 2024	(Hungary) Debrecen	3	Germany; Spain; Canada
Total			8	

== FIBA Universality-driven Olympic Qualifying Tournament 1 (UOQT1) ==
The tournament was held in Hong Kong between 12 and 14 April 2024. The pools were revealed on 22 January 2024.

=== Qualified teams ===
Qualification method	Date	Venue	Berths	Qualified team
UOQT hosts	22 December 2023	—	1	Hong Kong
FIBA 3x3 World Rankings	1 November 2023	—	7	Hungary; Netherlands; Azerbaijan; Poland; Egypt; Mongolia; Chile
Total			8	

=== Preliminary round ===
==== Pool A ====
Pos	Team	Pld	W	L	PF	PA	PD	Qualification	Hungary	Poland	Egypt	Hong Kong
1	Hungary	3	2	1	54	39	+15	Semifinals		16–12		21–7
2	Poland	3	2	1	50	29	+21	Semifinals			21–6	17–7
3	Egypt	3	2	1	45	50	−5		20–17			
4	Hong Kong (H)	3	0	3	26	57	−31				12–19	

Source: FIBA
Rules for classification: 1) Wins; 2) Points scored; 3) Head-to-head record.
(H) Hosts

==== Pool B ====
Pos	Team	Pld	W	L	PF	PA	PD	Qualification	Netherlands	Azerbaijan	Chile	Mongolia
1	Netherlands	3	3	0	51	31	+20	Semifinals		15–11	16–13	
2	Azerbaijan	3	2	1	41	41	0	Semifinals			17–14	13–12
3	Chile	3	1	2	48	48	0					21–15
4	Mongolia	3	0	3	34	54	−20		7–20			

Source: FIBA
Rules for classification: 1) Wins; 2) Points scored; 3) Head-to-head record.

=== Bracket ===
Semi-finals
14 April
Hungary	19
Azerbaijan	21
14 April
Netherlands	12
Poland	20

Final
14 April
Azerbaijan	18
Poland	17

== FIBA Universality-driven Olympic Qualifying Tournament 2 (UOQT2) ==
The tournament was held in Utsunomiya, Japan between 3 and 5 May 2024. The pools were revealed on 22 January 2024.

=== Qualified teams ===
Qualification method		Date	Venue	Berths	Qualified team
UOQT hosts		29 November 2023	—	1	Japan
2023 FIBA 3x3 Continental Cup	Africa	1–3 December 2023	(Egypt) Cairo	1	Kenya
2023 FIBA 3x3 Continental Cup	Americas	1–3 December 2023	(Puerto Rico) San Juan	1	Brazil
2023 FIBA 3x3 Continental Cup	Asia and Oceania	29 March – 2 April 2023	Singapore	1	Australia
2023 FIBA 3x3 Continental Cup	Europe	5–7 September 2023	(Israel) Jerusalem	1	Netherlands
2023 FIBA 3x3 World Cup		30 May – 4 June 2023	(Austria) Vienna	3	Germany; Canada; Austria
Total				8	

=== Preliminary round ===
==== Pool A ====
Pos	Team	Pld	W	L	PF	PA	PD	Qualification	Germany	Brazil	Japan	Austria
1	Germany	3	2	1	50	38	+12	Semifinals		17–16	12–13	
2	Brazil	3	2	1	50	40	+10	Semifinals				21–11
3	Japan (H)	3	2	1	46	40	+6			12–13		21–15
4	Austria	3	0	3	35	63	−28		9–21			

Source: FIBA
Rules for classification: 1) Wins; 2) Points scored; 3) Head-to-head record.
(H) Hosts

==== Pool B ====
Pos	Team	Pld	W	L	PF	PA	PD	Qualification	Australia	Canada	Netherlands	Kenya
1	Australia	3	2	1	59	43	+16	Semifinals		21–16		
2	Canada	3	2	1	57	42	+15	Semifinals			22–9	19–12
3	Netherlands	3	2	1	48	45	+3		18–16			21–7
4	Kenya	3	0	3	28	62	−34		9–22			

Source: FIBA
Rules for classification: 1) Wins; 2) Points scored; 3) Head-to-head record.

=== Bracket ===
Semi-finals
5 May
Germany	12
Canada	18
5 May
Australia	18
Brazil	16

Final
5 May
Canada	16
Australia	19

== FIBA Olympic Qualifying Tournament (OQT) ==
The tournament was held in Debrecen, Hungary between 16 and 19 May 2024. The pools were revealed on 22 January 2024.

=== Qualified teams ===
Qualification method	Date	Venue	Berths	Qualified team
OQT hosts	29 November 2023	—	1	Hungary
FIBA 3x3 World Rankings	1 November 2023	—	15	Egypt; Tunisia; Canada; Chile; Japan; Mongolia; Germany; Spain; Netherlands; Lithuania; Poland; Czech Republic; Italy; Israel; Ukraine
Total			16	

=== Preliminary round ===
==== Pool A ====
Pos	Team	Pld	W	L	PF	PA	PD	Qualification	Germany	Poland	Ukraine	Tunisia
1	Germany	3	3	0	46	32	+14	Quarterfinals			9–7	17–7
2	Poland	3	2	1	60	45	+15	Quarterfinals	18–20			
3	Ukraine	3	1	2	46	38	+8			18–21		21–8
4	Tunisia	3	0	3	22	59	−37			7–21		

Source: FIBA
Rules for classification: 1) Wins; 2) Points scored; 3) Head-to-head record.

==== Pool B ====
Pos	Team	Pld	W	L	PF	PA	PD	Qualification	Canada	Czech Republic	Lithuania	Chile
1	Canada	3	3	0	57	37	+20	Quarterfinals			19–16	21–11
2	Czech Republic	3	1	2	50	57	−7	Quarterfinals	10–17			
3	Lithuania	3	1	2	49	54	−5			21–19		12–16
4	Chile	3	1	2	46	54	−8			19–21		

Source: FIBA
Rules for classification: 1) Wins; 2) Points scored; 3) Head-to-head record.

==== Pool C ====
Pos	Team	Pld	W	L	PF	PA	PD	Qualification	Spain	Japan	Mongolia	Egypt
1	Spain	3	3	0	64	24	+40	Quarterfinals		21–12	21–7	
2	Japan	3	2	1	47	48	−1	Quarterfinals			16–13	19–14
3	Mongolia	3	1	2	37	52	−15					17–15
4	Egypt	3	0	3	34	58	−24		5–22			

Source: FIBA
Rules for classification: 1) Wins; 2) Points scored; 3) Head-to-head record.

==== Pool D ====
Pos	Team	Pld	W	L	PF	PA	PD	Qualification	Hungary	Italy	Netherlands	Israel
1	Hungary (H)	3	2	1	52	46	+6	Quarterfinals			13–11	21–16
2	Italy	3	2	1	49	42	+7	Quarterfinals	19–18			
3	Netherlands	3	2	1	45	40	+5			13–9		21–18
4	Israel	3	0	3	45	63	−18			11–21		

Source: FIBA
Rules for classification: 1) Wins; 2) Points scored; 3) Head-to-head record.
(H) Hosts

=== Bracket ===
Quarter-finals
19 May
Germany (OT)	16
Japan	14
19 May
Hungary	16
Czech Republic	9
19 May
Canada	21
Italy	8
19 May
Spain	21
Poland	13

Semi-finals
19 May
Germany	19
Hungary	17
19 May
Canada	18
Spain	19

Final
19 May
Germany	Q
Spain	Q
Third place
19 May
Hungary	10
Canada	21

Note: By winning their semi-final matches both Germany and Spain qualified for the Olympics, thus the final match was not played.
