= Katherine Plouffe =

Canadian basketball player

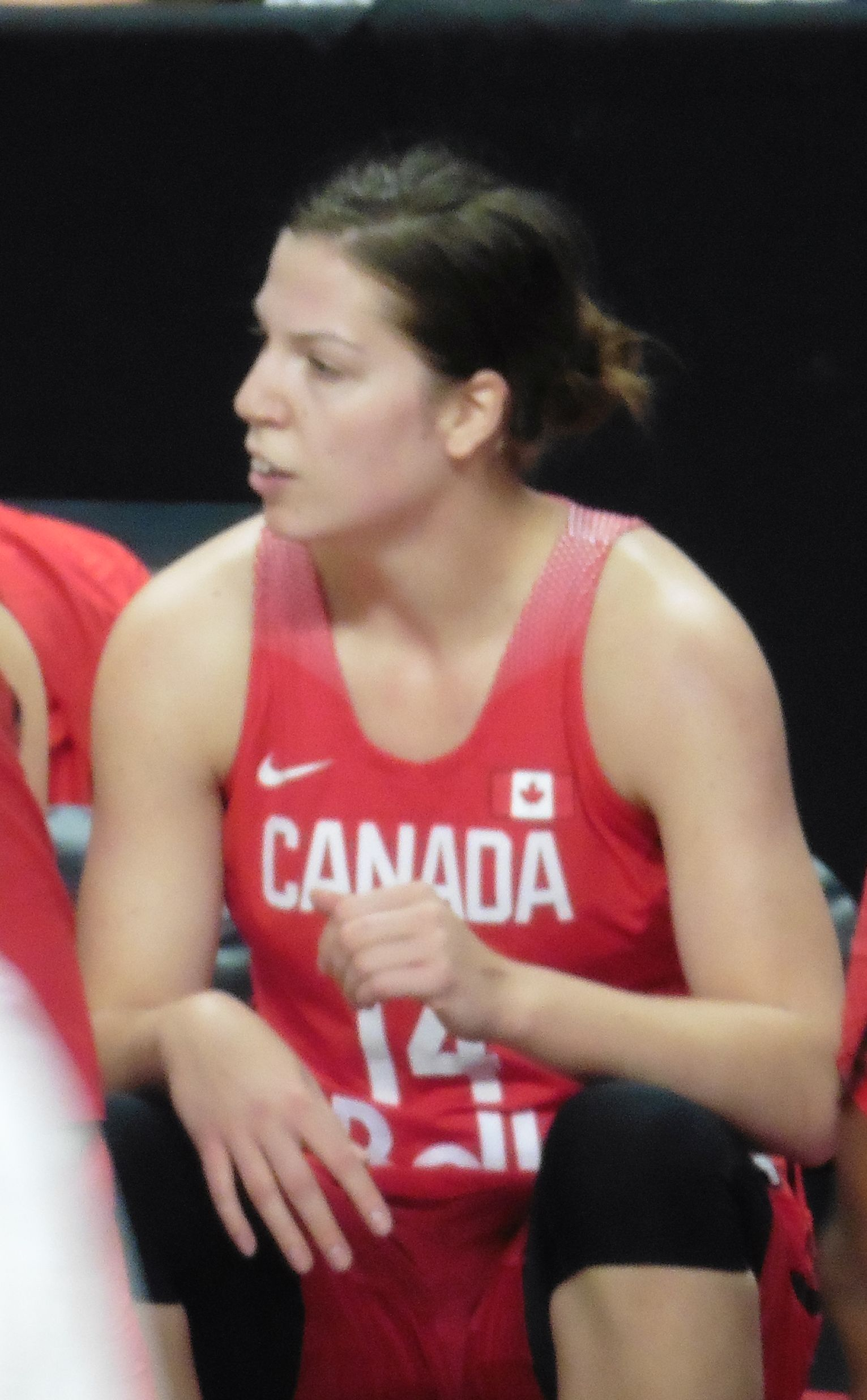

No. 21 – Tango Bourges Basket
- Position: Power forward
- League: LFB

Personal information
- Born: September 15, 1992 (age 34) Edmonton, Alberta, Canada
- Listed height: 6 ft 3 in (1.91 m)

Career information
- High school: Harry Ainlay (Edmonton, Alberta)
- College: Marquette (2010–2014)
Medals
Representing Canada
Women's basketball
Pan American Games
Gold medal – first place	2015 Toronto	Team
FIBA AmeriCup
Gold medal – first place	2017 Buenos Aires
Women's 3x3 basketball
World Cup
Silver medal – second place	2022 Antwerp	Team
FIBA 3x3 AmeriCup
Gold medal – first place	2026 San Salvador
Silver medal – second place	2025 León

Katherine Plouffe (born September 15, 1992) is a Canadian basketball player for Tango Bourges Basket and the Canadian national team, where she participated at the 2014 FIBA World Championship. She competed at the 2022 FIBA 3x3 World Cup, winning a silver medal.

She is the daughter of Laurie and Daryl Plouffe. She has four siblings; her twin sister, Michelle, played basketball for the University of Utah located in Salt Lake City, Utah, United States, and her older sister, Andrea, played basketball at the University of Washington located in Seattle, Washington.

== Early years ==
Plouffe first started playing basketball in grade two. She had older siblings who were often in the gym. She enjoyed being in the gym with her older siblings so she picked up the game at a young age. She played collegiately at Marquette in Milwaukee, Wisconsin.

== Pan Am games 2015 ==
Plouffe was a member of the Canada women's national basketball team which participated in basketball at the 2015 Pan American Games held in Toronto, Ontario July 10 to 26, 2015. Canada opened the preliminary rounds with an easy 101–38 win over Venezuela. The following day they beat Argentina 73–58. The final preliminary game was against Cuba; both teams were 2–0, so the winner would win the group. The game went down to the wire with Canada eking out a 71–68 win. Canada would face Brazil in the semifinal.

Everything seemed to go right in the semifinal game. Canada opened the game with an 11–2 run on seven consecutive points by Miranda Ayim. Miah-Marie Langlois contributed five assists. In the third quarter Canada strongly out rebounded Brazil and hit 69% of their field goals to score 33 points in the quarter. Lizanne Murphy and Nirra Fields hit three-pointers to help extend the lead to 68–39 at the end of three quarters. Canada continued to dominate in the fourth quarter with three-pointers by Kia Nurse and Kim Gaucher. Canada went on to win the game 91–63 to earn a spot in the gold-medal game against the USA.

The gold-medal game matched up the host team Canada against USA, in a sold out arena dominated by fans in red and white and waving the Canadian flag. The Canadian team, arm in arm, sang O Canada as the respective national anthems were played.

After trading baskets early the US edged out to a double-digit lead in the second quarter. However the Canadians, spurred on by the home crowd cheering, fought back and tied up the game at halftime. In the third quarter, it was Canada's time to shine as they outscore the US 26–15. The lead would reach as high as 18 points. The USA would fight back, but not all the way and Canada won the game and the gold-medal 81–73. It was Canada's first gold-medal in basketball in the Pan Am games. Nurse was the star for Canada with 33 points, hitting 11 of her 12 free-throw attempts in 10 of her 17 field-goal attempts including two of three three-pointers. Plouffe contributed two rebounds, one block and two points.

== Marquette statistics ==
Legend
GP	Games played	GS	Games started	MPG	Minutes per game
FG%	Field goal percentage	3P%	3-point field goal percentage	FT%	Free throw percentage
RPG	Rebounds per game	APG	Assists per game	SPG	Steals per game
BPG	Blocks per game	PPG	Points per game	**Bold**	Career high

YEAR	SCHOOL	GP	GS	MPG	FG%	3P%	FT%	RPG	APG	SPG	BPG	PPG
2010-11	Marquette	**33**	30	0.0	50.0%	-	60.0%	5.1	1.2	0.8	0.6	6.5
2011-12	Marquette	31	30	**33.7**	**50.3%**	-	74.6%	8.1	2.6	**1.9**	**0.8**	13.5
2012-13	Marquette	32	**32**	29.4	47.7%	23.1%	70.0%	7.8	**2.9**	1.4	0.6	12.6
2013-14	Marquette	30	30	30.6	47.3%	**30.6%**	**81.5%**	**10.2**	2.3	1.0	0.6	**17.1**
Total	Marquette	126	122	23.0	48.6%	26.9%	73.5%	7.7	2.3	1.3	0.6	12.3
