= Marie Reichert =

German basketball player (born 2001)

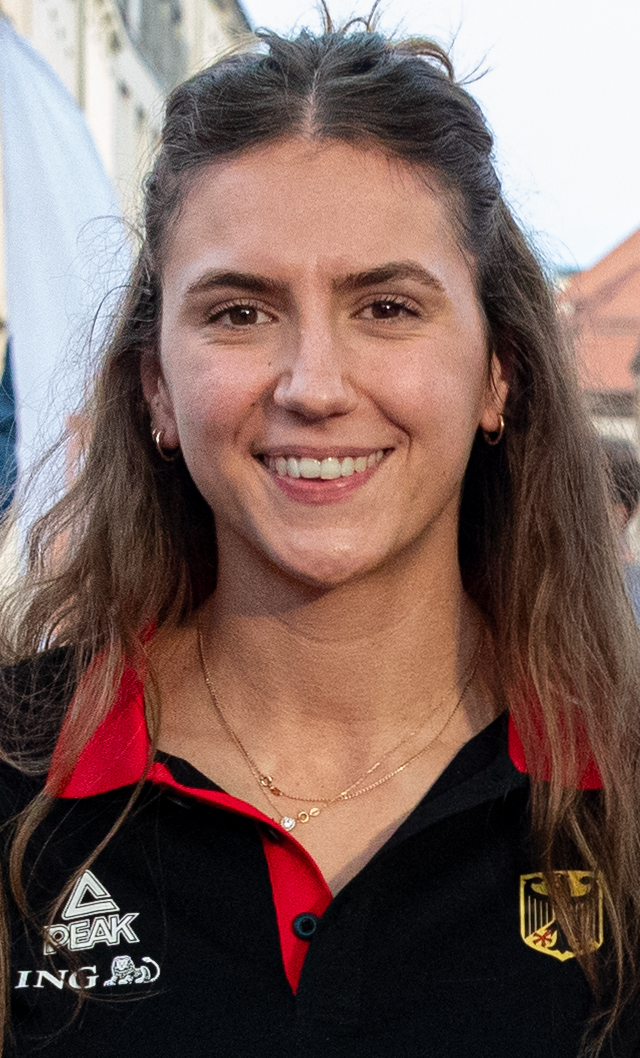
- Reichert in 2025

Personal information
- Born: 16 April 2001 (age 25) Kassel, Hesse, Germany
- Listed height: 1.85 m (6 ft 1 in)

Career information
- College: Old Dominion (2019–2020)
- Position: Power forward
Medals
Women's 3x3 basketball
Representing Germany
Olympic Games
Gold medal – first place	2024 Paris	Team

Stella Marie Reichert (born 16 April 2001) is a German basketball player who plays as a power forward.

== Early life and career ==
Reichert comes from a basketball family, her father and brother also played the sport. She played for CVJM Kassel and moved to BC Marburg in 2014. There she was promoted at the girls' basketball performance center. The 1.85-meter-tall (6 ft 1 in) wing and inside player was a member of the Bender Baskets Grünberg in the 2nd Bundesliga.

== College career ==
For the 2019–20 season, Reichert moved to Old Dominion University in the US state of Virginia. She took part in 30 games and averaged 4.8 points per game. In the 2020–21 season, she did not take part in the season due to the COVID-19 pandemic,

== Professional career ==
By February 2021, Reichert was a guest at the training sessions of the Bundesliga club BG 74 Göttingen and then in the 2021–22 season she was eligible to play for the Lower Saxony club. In 2022, Reichert joined the Bundesliga club Osnabrücker SC. In June 2024, she was announced as a new signing for the Italian first division team Faenza Basket.

For the 2025–26 season, Reichert moved to the Bundesliga club TK Hannover.

== National team career ==
In 2017, Reichert took part in the U16 European Championship. In July 2019, she was part of the German squad that competed in the U19 World Cup in Thailand. In November 2021, she made her first appearance in an A international match.

Reichert also became a member of the German national 3x3 team and as such a participant in the 2024 Summer Olympics, which they won after winning the final against Spain 17–16.
