= Sandra Ygueravide =

Spanish basketball player (born 1984)

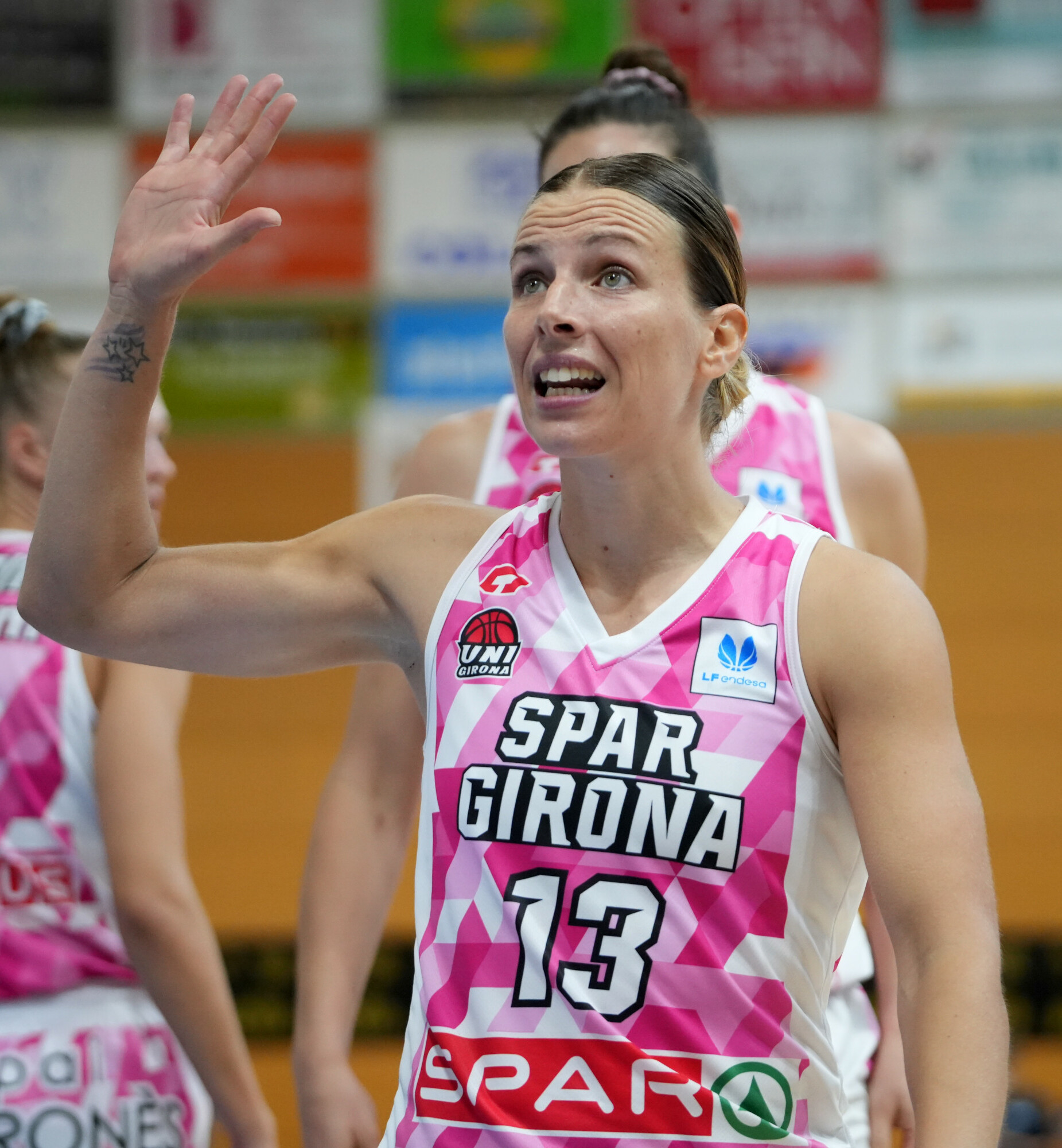
- Ygueravide in 2023

Personal information
- Born: 28 December 1984 (age 41) Valencia, Spain
- Listed height: 5 ft 8 in (1.73 m)

Career information
- Playing career: 2001–2024
- Position: Point guard

Career history
- 2001–2004: Ros Casares
- 2004–2005: Avenida
- 2005–2006: Ciudad de Burgos
- 2007–2011: Estudiantes
- 2011–2013: Txingudi
- 2013: Pays d'Aix Basket 13
- 2013–2014: Botaş
- 2016–2017: Wisła Kraków
- 2017–2019: Nadezhda Orenburg
- 2019–2020: UNI Győr
- 2020–2022: Villeneuve-d'Ascq
- 2022–2023: Gernika
- 2023–2024: Uni Girona

Career highlights
- Liga Femenina de Baloncesto champion (2004); 4x Copa de la Reina winner (2002, 2003, 2004, 2005); Polish Cup winner (2017); EuroCup Women winner (2019); 2x FIBA 3x3 Europe Cup winner (2021, 2024)
Medals
Women's 3x3 basketball
Representing Spain
Olympic Games
Silver medal – second place	2024 Paris	Team
FIBA 3x3 Europe Cup
Gold medal – first place	2021 Paris
Gold medal – first place	2024 Vienna	Team
Silver medal – second place	2023 Jerusalem
Silver medal – second place	2019 Debrecen	Team
Bronze medal – third place	2025 Copenhagen	Team

Sandra Ygueravide Viana (Note: In this Spanish name, the first or paternal surname is Ygueravide and the second or maternal family name is Viana.) (born 28 December 1984) is a Spanish former basketball player. She played as a point guard and also played for the Spain senior national and 3x3 team.

== Professional career ==
Ygueravide competed with the Spanish club Ros Casares in which she made her debut in the Liga Femenina at the age of seventeen. With the Valencian club, she won three Copa de la Reina (2002, 2003, 2004) titles and a league title (2003–04). In the 2004–05 season she signed for Avenida, winning her fourth Copa de la Reina trophy. Later, she played in several teams in the Liga Femenina, Ciudad de Burgos (2005–06), Estudiantes (2006–2011), and Txingudi (2011–13), among others. Ygueravide has also competed in the Turkish League, French clubs Pays d'Aix Basket 13, Villeneuve-d'Ascq, Polish club Wisła Kraków, where she won a Cup title (2017) and achieved a league runner-up (2016–17), and with Nadezhda Orenburg of the Russian League, winning their first European title, the EuroCup Women (2018–19). In the 2022–23 season, she returned to the Liga Femenina playing for Gernika and the following year, she signed with Uni Girona.

== National team career ==
Ygueravide played internationally with the Spanish senior national team. She has also competed internationally with the 3x3 team, winning the Europe Cup (2021, being MVP of the tournament), together with Vega Gimeno, Marta Canella and Aitana Cuevas, and runner-up twice (2019, 2023). In September 2022, she reached number 1 in the FIBA 3x3 ranking, becoming the first Spanish player to do so.
