= Germany women's national 3x3 team =

German basketball team

Germany
- FIBA ranking: 1
- FIBA zone: FIBA Europe
- National federation: DBB
- Coach: Matthias Weber

Olympic Games
- Appearances: 1
- Medals: (gold) Gold (2024)

World Cup
- Appearances: 8

Europe Cup
- Appearances: 6
- Medals: (silver) Silver (2021)
Home	Away

The Germany women's national 3x3 team is a national basketball team of Germany, governed by Deutscher Basketball Bund (DBB). It represents the country in international 3x3 (3 against 3) women's basketball competitions.

Throughout 2021, the team had continuous leaps in performance and celebrated several tournament victories at the highest level. As of 2021/2022, the team has been first place in the world according to the FIBA rankings.

== History ==
=== 2019 ===
At the 2019 European Games in Minsk the team, led by Satou Sabally, finished 4th.

In summer 2019, long-time Germany women's national team player and captain Svenja Brunckhorst started with 3×3 basketball. Brunckhorst had started her career at TSV 1880 Wasserburg. The Point guard also played in Spain and France during her career, but she was most successful in her hometown of Wasserburg, where she contributed to six league titles between 2008 and 2016.

Sonja Greinacher agreed at the same time with her constant companion since the youth selections at the DBB.

=== 2020 ===
Brunckhorst, Stefanie Grigoleit, Theresa Simon and WNBA reinforcement Satou Sabally almost managed to qualify for the Olympic premiere. However, they failed in a strong preliminary round group against France and the USA. Yet, the good performances at the 2021 FIBA 3x3 Women's Olympic Qualifying Tournament boosted public attention.

=== 2021 ===
At the 2021 FIBA 3x3 Europe Cup, the Team Germany finished 2nd. The team consisted of Svenja Brunckhort, Luana Rodefeld, Katharina Müller and Sonja Greinacher, all of whom had benefited from the Bundeswehr’s top-level sports promotion which had also enabled Brunckhorst to get a Master's degree in international management. Never before had a German Basketball Federation women's selection been so successful. Noteworthy was that the event featured high profile competition as numerous Euroleague and WNBA players showed up. In the final, the German selection ceded 12–16 Spain.

The team was further reinforced by former and current national team and Damen-Basketball-Bundesliga players Stefanie Grigoleit, Ama Degbeon, Theresa Simon and Jennifer Crowder.

In November 2021, Greinacher and Brunckhorst returned to Germany's "regular" basketball national team in order to compete at the EuroBasket Women 2023 qualification.

== Competitions ==
=== Summer Olympics ===
Year	Position	Pld	W	L	Players
(Japan) 2020 Tokyo	Did not qualify				
(France) 2024 Paris	1st	9	8	1	Reichert, Mevius, Greinacher, Brunckhorst
Total	1/2	9	8	1	

=== World Cup ===
Year	Position	Pld	W	L	Players
(Greece) 2012 Athens	13th	8	5	3	Höre, Höre, Thurau, Schindler
(Russia) 2014 Moscow	8th	7	4	3	Danckert, Ohanian, Shaw, von Geyr
(China) 2016 Guangzhou	Did not qualify				
(France) 2017 Nantes	12th	4	2	2	Annawald, Bruns, Ann Mihalyi, Müller
(Philippines) 2018 Bocaue	15th	4	1	3	Bruns, Müller, Rodefeld, Zdravevska
(Netherlands) 2019 Amsterdam	Did not qualify				
(Belgium) 2022 Antwerp	9th	5	2	3	Brunckhorst, Fiebich, Greinacher, Rodefeld
(Austria) 2023 Vienna	5th	6	4	2	Brunckhorst, Greinacher, Rodefeld, Reichert
(Mongolia) 2025 Ulaanbaatar	11th	5	2	3	Degbeon, Mevius, Polleros, Zolper
(Poland) 2026 Warsaw	5th	5	4	1	Daub, Degbeon, Reichert, Zolper
2027 Singapore	To be determined				
Total	8/11	44	24	20	

=== Europe Cup ===
Year	Final tournament				Players
Year	Pos	Pld	W	L	Players
(Romania) 2014 Bucharest	Did not qualify				
(Romania) 2016 Bucharest	Did not qualify				
(Netherlands) 2017 Amsterdam	Did not qualify				
(Romania) 2018 Bucharest	Did not qualify				
(Hungary) 2019 Debrecen	Did not qualify				
(France) 2021 Paris	2nd	5	3	2	Brunckhorst, Greinacher, Müller, Rodefeld
(Austria) 2022 Graz	5th	3	2	1	Brunckhorst, Greinacher, Degbeon, Rodefeld
(Israel) 2023 Jerusalem	8th	3	1	2	Crowder, Degbeon, Greinacher, Simon
(Austria) 2024 Vienna	5th	3	1	2	Degbeon, Kröner, Mevius, Poros
(Denmark) 2025 Copenhagen	5th	3	1	2	Degbeon, Polleros, Poros, Zolper
(Belgium) 2026 Antwerp	5th	3	2	1	Degbeon, Polleros, Reichert, Zolper
Total	6/11	20	10	10	

=== Champions Cup ===
Year	Position	Pld	W	L
(Thailand) 2025 Bangkok	4th	5	2	3
(Thailand) 2026 Bangkok	did not qualify			
Total	1/1	5	2	3

== See also ==
- Germany women's national basketball team
- Germany men's national 3x3 team
