= Juana Camilión =

Spanish basketball player (born 1999)

Personal information
- Born: 22 March 1999 (age 27) Mar del Plata, Buenos Aires Province, Argentina
- Listed height: 1.80 m (5 ft 11 in)
Medals
Women's 3x3 basketball
Representing Spain
Olympic Games
Silver medal – second place	2024 Paris	Team
Europe Cup
Bronze medal – third place	2025 Vienna	Team
Silver medal – second place	2023 Jerusalem
Bronze medal – third place	2025 Copenhagen	Team

Juana Camilión Cúccaro (Note: In this Spanish name, the first or paternal surname is Camilión and the second or maternal family name is Cuccaro.) (born 22 March 1999) is a basketball player. Born in Argentina, she represented Spain at the 2024 Summer Olympics in 3x3 event.

== Early life ==
Camilión was born in Mar del Plata to Argentine parents from the same city. When she was two years old, she and her family moved to Spain.
