= Gracia Alonso de Armiño =

Spanish basketball player (born 1992)

Personal information
- Born: 11 August 1992 (age 34) Bilbao, Spain
- Listed height: 1.80 m (5 ft 11 in)

Career information
- High school: West (Knoxville, Tennessee)
- College: Freed–Hardeman
- Playing career: 2016–present
- Position: Power forward

Career history
- 2016–2017: Gernika
- 2017–2018: Ibaizabal
- 2018–2019: Real Canoe
- 2019–2021: Estudiantes
- 2021–2022: Arsaki
- 2022–2023: Basket Zaragoza
- 2023–2024: IDK Gipuzkoa
- 2024–: Estudiantes

Career highlights
- Copa de la Reina winner (2023)
Medals
Women's 3x3 basketball
Representing Spain
Olympic Games
Silver medal – second place	2024 Paris	Team
FIBA 3x3 Europe Cup
Gold medal – first place	2024 Vienna	Team
Silver medal – second place	2023 Jerusalem
Silver medal – second place	2026 Antwerp	Team
Bronze medal – third place	2025 Copenhagen	Team

Gracia Alonso de Armiño Riaño (Note: In this Spanish name, the first or paternal surname is Alonso de Armiño and the second or maternal family name is Riaño.) (born 11 August 1992) is a Spanish basketball player who plays as a power forward for Estudiantes. She debuted in the Liga Femenina in the 2016/17 season.

== Early life and career ==
Alonso de Armiño made her basketball debut at the age of 6 at Berrio Otxoa. During her childhood and cadet years, she played with the Bizkaia and Basque national teams. At the age of 16, she played a season at Basket Ibaizabal, a team with which she played in the Liga Femenina 2.

During her stay in the United States, where she moved at 17 years old, Alonso de Armiño played with West High School in Knoxville, Tennessee, a team with which she became District and Regional champion. In 2011, she competed in the NCAA with Freed–Hardeman University, where she remained for four years. She also began her nursing studies there.

== Professional career ==
Alonso de Armiño then competed in the Basketligan dam with the club Mark Basket. She returned to Spain and joined Gernika in the 2016/17 season, which marked her debut in the Liga Femenina Endesa. She competed in Liga Femenina 2 with Basket Ibaizabal in 2017/18, and Real Canoe in 2018/19.

In the 2019/20 season, Alonso de Armiño joined the club Estudiantes. That season she was nominated 8 times for the "Best Quintet" that recognizes the best individual performances of the Estudiantes teams in ACB, Liga Femenina 2 and EBA. In her second season at Estudiantes, in 2020/21, she returned to the senior category of the Liga Femenina.

Alonso de Armiño signed for Arsaki for the 2021–2022 season. She then signed for Casademont Zaragoza for the 2022/2023 season. After winning the Copa de la Reina title, on 29 May 2023, she departed from the club.

== National team career ==
In 2020, Alonso de Armiño was selected for the Spanish 3x3 national team.

== Personal life ==
Back in Spain, Alonso de Armiño worked as a nurse during the COVID-19 pandemic.
