= Sonja Greinacher =

German basketball player

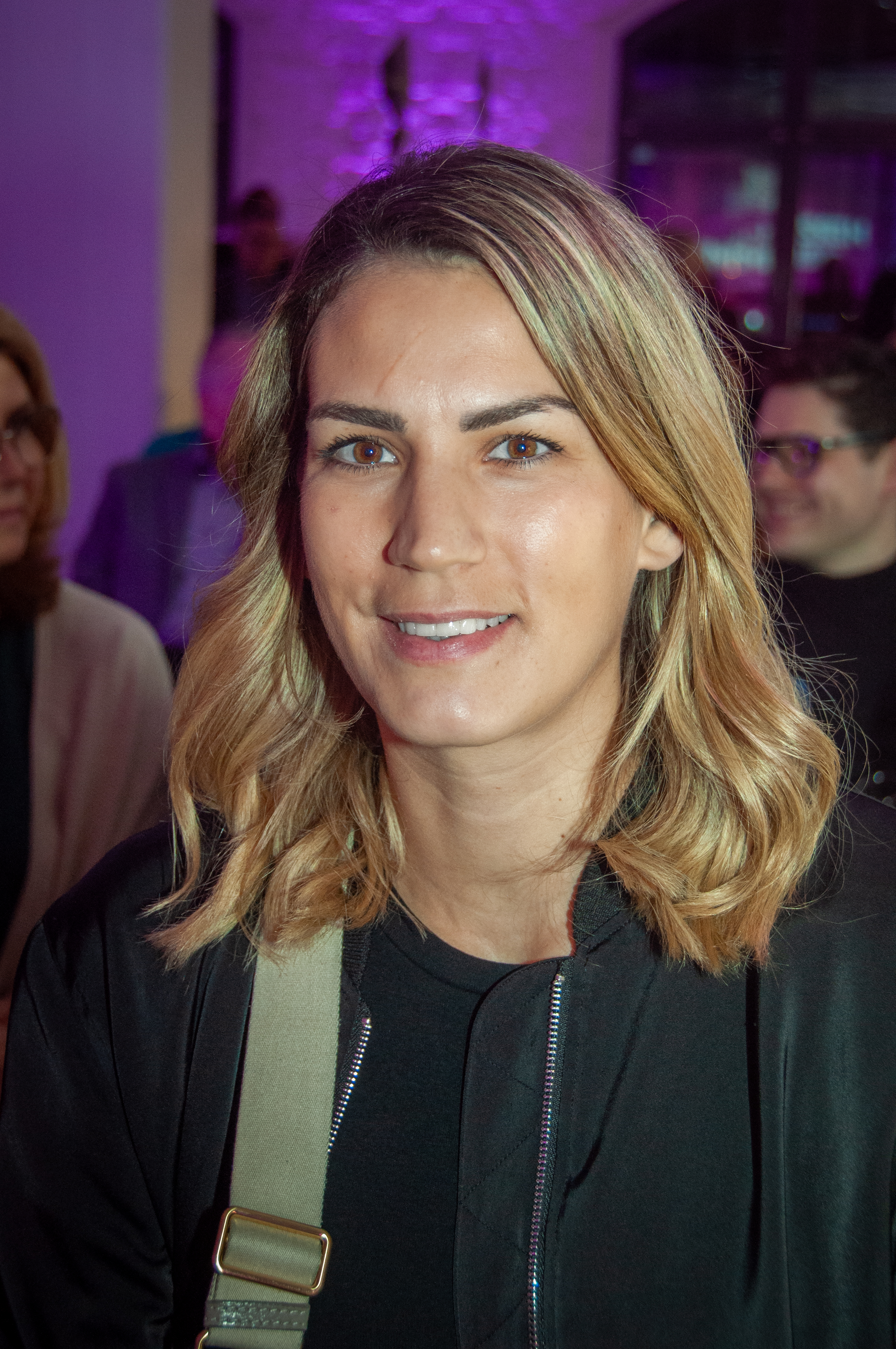
- Greinacher in 2024

Personal information
- Born: 1 July 1992 (age 34) Essen, North Rhine-Westphalia, Germany
- Listed height: 1.90 m (6 ft 3 in)

Career information
- College: Gonzaga (2011–2015)
Medals
Women's 3x3 basketball
Representing Germany
Olympic Games
Gold medal – first place	2024 Paris	Team
Europe Cup
Silver medal – second place	2021 Paris

Sonja Greinacher, also known as Sunny Greinacher (born 1 July 1992), is a German basketball player. She represented Germany at the 2024 Summer Olympics, winning the gold medal in the 3x3 event.
