= Vega Gimeno =

Spanish basketball player (born 1991)

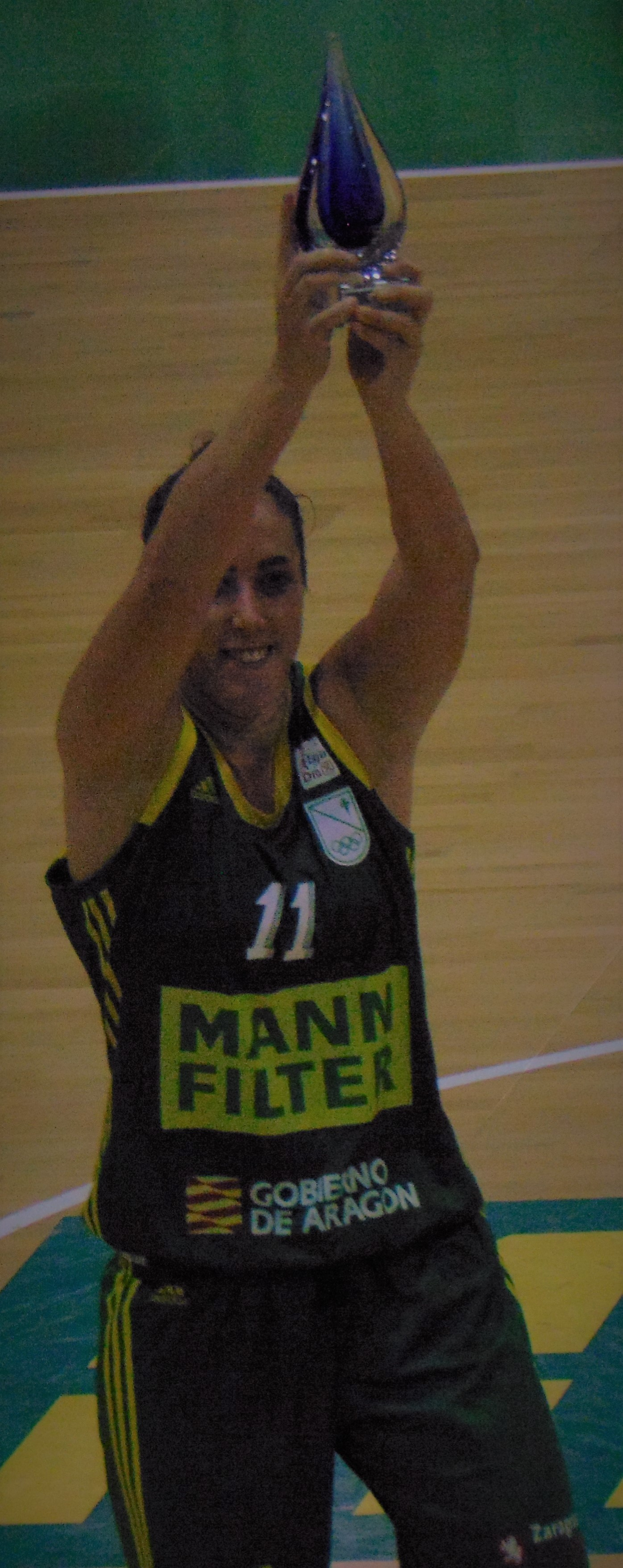
- Gimeno in 2019

Personal information
- Born: 8 January 1991 (age 35) Valencia, Spain
- Listed height: 6 ft 1 in (1.85 m)

Career information
- College: Robert Morris (2009–2010)
- Playing career: 2008–2024
- Position: Small forward

Career history
- 2008–2009: Segle XXI
- 2010–2014: Baloncesto Rivas
- 2014–2015: Islas Canarias
- 2015–2017: Bembibre
- 2018–2020: Stadium Casablanca
- 2020–2021: Ensino Lugo
- 2021–2024: Basket Zaragoza

Career highlights
- Liga Femenina de Baloncesto champion (2014); 3x Copa de la Reina winner (2011, 2013, 2023); 2x FIBA 3x3 Europe Cup winner (2021, 2024)
Medals
Representing Spain
Women's 3x3 basketball
Olympic Games
| Silver medal – second place | 2024 Paris | Team |
Europe Cup
| Gold medal – first place | 2021 Paris |
| Gold medal – first place | 2024 Vienna | Team |
| Silver medal – second place | 2019 Debrecen | Team |
| Silver medal – second place | 2023 Jerusalem |
| Bronze medal – third place | 2025 Copenhagen | Team |
European Games
| Bronze medal – third place | 2015 Baku | Team |
Women's basketball
U18 EuroBasket
| Gold medal – first place | 2009 Sweden |
U20 EuroBasket
| Gold medal – first place | 2011 Serbia |

Vega Gimeno Martínez (Note: In this Spanish name, the first or paternal surname is Gimeno and the second or maternal family name is Martínez.) (born 8 January 1991) is a Spanish former basketball player who played as a small forward. She also played for the Spanish 3x3 team.

== Professional career ==
A small forward, Gimeno started playing basketball at El Pilar College in Valencia and completed her training with the Segle XXI team. She competed in the NCAA with Robert Morris University (2009–10) and the following season, she made her debut in the Liga Femenina with Rivas Ecopolis. With the Madrid team, she won a league title (2013–14) and two Copa de la Reina trophies (2011, 2013). Later, she played in Islas Canarias 2014 (2014–15), Embutidos Pajariel Bembibre (2015–17), Stadium Casablanca (2017–2020) and Ensino Lugo (2020–21), where she was the best national scorer of the season. In the 2021–22 season, she signed for Basket Zaragoza, with whom she won her third Copa de la Reina (2023).

On 16 April 2024, Gimeno announced her retirement at the end of the season.

== National team career ==
Having completed internationally with the Spanish national team in youth categories, in which she became the U18 Eurobasket (2009) and U20 Eurobasket (2011) with these respective teams. She has also competed internationally with the 3x3 team, winning the Europe Cup (2021), together with Sandra Ygueravide, Marta Canella and Aitana Cuevas, and runner-up twice (2019, 2023).
