= Spain women's national 3x3 team =

National 3x3 basketball team

Spain
- FIBA ranking: 9
- Joined FIBA: 1934
- FIBA zone: FIBA Europe
- National federation: FEB
- Nickname(s): La ÑBA, la Roja

Olympic Games
- Appearances: 1
- Medals: (silver) Silver (2024)

World Cup
- Appearances: 10

Europe Cup
- Appearances: 11
- Medals: Gold: (2021),(2024); Silver: (2017, 2019, 2023, 2026); Bronze: (2025)

European Games
- Appearances: 1
- Medals: Bronze: (2015)

Mediterranean Games
- Appearances: 2
- Medals: Gold: (2022); Silver: (2018)
Home	Away

The Spain women's national 3x3 team is the 3x3 basketball team representing Spain in international women's competitions, organized and run by the Spanish Basketball Federation. (Spanish: Federación Española de Baloncesto)

At the 2019 World Cup, the no. 7 ranked player in the world Aitana Cuevas led the tournament in 8 points per game to lead Spain to the quarters.

== Senior competitions ==
=== Summer Olympics ===
Year	Pos	Pld	W	L	Players
(Japan) 2020 Tokyo	Did not qualify				
(France) 2024 Paris	2nd	9	5	4	Alonso de Armiño, Camilion, Gimeno, Ygueravide
Total	1/2	9	5	4	

=== World Cup ===
Year	Pos	Pld	W	L	Players
(Greece) 2012	10th	6	4	2	Gastaminza, Nicholls, Ouviña, Rodríguez
(Russia) 2014	9th	6	4	2	Blé, Díaz, Gastaminza, Gómez
(China) 2016	4th	7	4	3	Cuevas, García, Hurtado, Palomares
(France) 2017	8th	5	3	2	Gimeno, Menéndez, Montenegro, Ygueravide
(Philippines) 2018	7th	5	3	2	Cuevas, Gimeno, Martínez, Palomares
(Netherlands) 2019	5th	5	4	1	Cuevas, Gimeno, Martínez, Ygueravide
(Belgium) 2022	5th	5	4	1	Canella, Cuevas, Gimeno, Ygueravide
(Austria) 2023	8th	6	3	3	Canella, Gimeno, Muhate, Ygueravide
(Mongolia) 2025	7th	5	4	1	Alonso de Armiño, Camilión, Gimeno, Ygueravide
(Poland) 2026	13th	4	2	2	Alarcón, Alonso de Armiño, Muhate, Prieto
(Singapore) 2027	To be determined				
Total	10/11	54	35	19	

=== Europe Cup ===
Year	Final tournament				Qualifier			Players
Year	Pos	Pld	W	L	Pld	W	L	Players
(Romania) 2014	10th	3	1	2	6	4	2	Bahi, Díaz, Gastaminza, Pérez
(Romania) 2016	8th	3	1	2	4	2	2	Asurmendi, Gimeno, Montenegro, Ygueravide
(Netherlands) 2017	2nd	5	3	2	5	3	2	Cuevas, Hurtado, Palomares, San Román
(Romania) 2018	6th	3	2	1	5	4	1	Cuevas, Gimeno, Martínez, Palomares
(Hungary) 2019	2nd	5	3	2	4	3	1	Cuevas, Gimeno, Martínez, Ygueravide
(France) 2021	1st	5	5	0	3	2	1	Cuevas, Gimeno, Canella, Ygueravide
(Austria) 2022	4th	5	3	2				Cuevas, Gimeno, Canella, Ygueravide
(Israel) 2023	2nd	5	3	2	5	4	1	Alonso de Armiño (F), Camilion (F), Gimeno, Ygueravide, Muhate (Q), Oma (Q)
(Austria) 2024	1st	5	5	0	3	3	0	Alonso de Armiño, Camilion, Gimeno, Ygueravide
(Denmark) 2025	3rd	4	3	1				Alonso de Armiño, Camilion, Gimeno, Ygueravide
(Belgium) 2026	2nd	5	4	1				Txell Alarcón, Alonso de Armiño, Canella, Oma
Total	11/11	43	28	15				

=== European Games ===
Year	Pos	Pld	W	L	Players
(Azerbaijan) 2015	3rd	7	6	1	Gimeno, Montenegro, Novo, Zanoguera
(Belarus) 2019	5th	4	2	2	Canella, Díaz, Lo, Oma
(Poland) 2023	3rd	6	5	1	Muhate, Oma, Prieto, Rodríguez
Total	3/3	17	13	4	

=== Mediterranean Games ===
Year	Pos	Pld	W	L	Players
(Spain) 2018	2nd	6	5	1	Flores, Lizarazu, Lo, Quevedo
(Algeria) 2022	1st	6	6	0	Ayuso, Guerrero, Rodríguez, Pueyo

=== Champions Cup ===
Year	Position	Pld	W	L
(Thailand) 2025 Bangkok	2nd	5	4	1
(Thailand) 2026 Bangkok	5th	3	1	2
Total	2/2	8	5	3

== Youth competitions ==
=== Youth Olympics ===
Year	Pos	Pld	W	L	Players
(China) 2014	3rd	13	10	3	Calvo, Flores, Orts, Togores
(Argentina) 2018	9th	4	2	2	Dembelé, Gamarra, García, Puiggròs

=== Under-18 World Championships ===
Year	Pos	Pld	W	L	Players
(Italy) 2011	1st	9	8	1	Ndour, Montolio, S. Rodríguez, Díaz
(Spain) 2012	2nd	8	7	1	Ndour, Pujol, L. Rodríguez, Trigueros
(India) 2013	3rd	9	6	3	Flores, Lo, Quevedo, Salvadores
(Hungary) 2015	11th	6	4	2	Alonso, Erauncetamurguil, Ginzo, Solé
(Kazakhstan) 2016	3rd	7	5	2	Alonso, Cáceres, Ginzo, Solé
(China) 2017	5th	5	4	1	Ayuso, Flores, Galerón, Wone
(Mongolia) 2019	did not participate				

== See also ==
- Spanish Basketball Federation
- Spain national basketball team
- Spain men's national 3x3 team
