= 2026 FIBA 3x3 U23 World Cup – Women's tournament =

Tournament details
- Host country: China
- City: Wuhan
- Dates: 15–19 September
- Teams: 20

Final positions
- Champions: United States (2nd title)
- Runners-up: Canada
- Third place: Spain
- Fourth place: Latvia

Tournament statistics
- MVP: (United States) Victoria Elizabeth Mckinney

The 2026 FIBA 3x3 U23 World Cup – Men's tournament will be the 7th edition of the FIBA 3x3 U23 World Cup, the annual international 3x3 basketball championship organised under the auspices of FIBA for under-23 women's national teams across the world.

The tournament will take place in Wuhan, marking the first time the city hosts the event and fourth time it will be host in China after, 2018, 2019, and 2025. Twenty teams will take part for the seventh time.

The United States won their second title, after defeated Canada 15–10 in final. Victoria Elizabeth Mckinney of the United States won the MVP award.

== Preliminary round ==
=== Pool A ===
Pos	Team	Pld	W	L	PF	PA	PD	Qualification	(France)	(China)	(Egypt)	(Italy)	(Philippines)
1	France	4	4	0	79	39	+40	Quarterfinals		21–16	16–10	21–9	21–4
2	China	4	3	1	73	66	+7	Quarterfinals	16–21		21–20	18–16	18–9
3	Egypt	4	2	2	63	63	0		10–16	20–21		17–14	16–12
4	Italy	4	1	3	58	55	+3		9–21	16–18	14–17		19–9
5	Philippines	4	0	4	34	74	−40		4–21	9–18	12–16	9–19	

Source: FIBA
Rules for classification: 1) Wins; 2) Head-to-head record; 3) Points scored.

=== Pool B ===
Pos	Team	Pld	W	L	PF	PA	PD	Qualification	(Netherlands)	(Canada)	(Czech Republic)	(Poland)	(Chinese Taipei)
1	Netherlands	4	3	1	61	54	+7	Quarterfinals		14–13	16–14	18–13	13–14
2	Canada	4	3	1	74	51	+23	Quarterfinals	13–14		19–15	22*–13	21–9
3	Czech Republic	4	2	2	60	61	−1		14–16	15–19		16–14	15–12
4	Poland	4	1	3	54	65	−11		13–18	13–22*	14–16		14–9
5	Chinese Taipei	4	1	3	44	63	−19		14–13	9–21	12–15	9–14	

Source: FIBA
Rules for classification: 1) Wins; 2) Head-to-head record; 3) Points scored.

(*): Max 21 points are taken into account for standing calculations.

=== Pool C ===
Pos	Team	Pld	W	L	PF	PA	PD	Qualification	(Spain)	(Latvia)	(Uganda)	(Madagascar)	(Tonga)
1	Spain	4	4	0	73	44	+29	Quarterfinals		16–15	19–10	17–14	21–5
2	Latvia	4	3	1	57	28	+29	Quarterfinals	15–16		21–8	W–0(f)	21–4
3	Uganda	4	2	2	47	53	−6		10–19	8–21		14–7	15–6
4	Madagascar	4	1	3	42	44	−2		14–17	0(f)–W	7–14		21–13
5	Tonga	4	0	4	28	78	−50		5–21	4–21	6–15	13–21	

Source: FIBA
Rules for classification: 1) Wins; 2) Head-to-head record; 3) Points scored.

=== Pool D ===
Pos	Team	Pld	W	L	PF	PA	PD	Qualification	(Australia)	(United States)	(Japan)	(Kenya)	(Slovenia)
1	Australia	4	4	0	61	40	+21	Quarterfinals		W–0(f)	20–11	21–12	20–17
2	United States	4	3	1	58	34	+24	Quarterfinals	0(f)–W		16–14	21–12	21–8
3	Japan	4	1	3	62	68	−6		11–20	14–16		22*–15	16–17
4	Kenya	4	1	3	57	79	−22		12–21	12–21	15–22*		18–15
5	Slovenia	4	1	3	57	75	−18		17–20	8–21	17–16	15–18	

Source: FIBA
Rules for classification: 1) Wins; 2) Head-to-head record; 3) Points scored.

(*): Max 21 points are taken into account for standing calculations.

== Knockout stage ==
Quarter-finals
19 September
France	15
Latvia	21
19 September
Australia	16
Canada	19
19 September
Netherlands	17
United States	21
19 September
Spain	16
China	12

Semi-finals
19 September
Latvia	8
Canada	21
19 September
United States	21
Spain	16

Final
19 September
Canada	10
United States	15
Third place
19 September
Latvia	14
Spain	22

== Final standing ==
Rank	Team
1st place, gold medalist(s)	United States
2nd place, silver medalist(s)	Canada
3rd place, bronze medalist(s)	Spain
4	Latvia
5	Australia
6	France
7	China
8	Netherlands
9	Egypt
10	Czech Republic
11	Uganda
12	Japan
13	Italy
14	Kenya
15	Slovenia
16	Poland
17	Chinese Taipei
18	Madagascar
19	Philippines
20	Tonga

== See also ==
- 2026 FIBA 3x3 U23 World Cup – Men's tournament
- 2026 FIBA 3x3 World Cup – Men's tournament
- 2026 FIBA 3x3 World Cup – Women's tournament
