= United States women's national under-23 3x3 team =

USA Women's under-23 3x3 team

United States
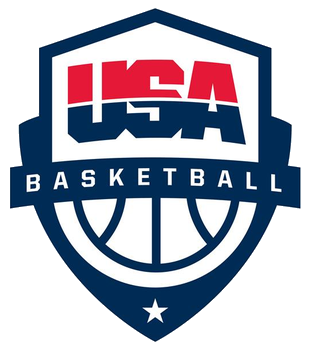
- FIBA zone: FIBA Americas
- National federation: USA Basketball

FIBA 3x3 U23 World Cup
- Appearances: 4
- Medals: Gold: (2024, 2026); Silver: (2022)
Medal record
FIBA 3x3 U23 World Cup
Gold medal – first place	2024 Ulaanbaatar
Gold medal – first place	2026 Wuhan
Silver medal – second place	2022 Bucharest

The USA Women's under-23 3x3 Teams are two of the under-23 3x3 basketball teams under the auspices of the USA Basketball organization. In 2018, International Basketball Federation (FIBA) held the FIBA 3x3 U23 World Cup. It is an 3x3 under-23 basketball tournament held in every year for basketball players up to 23 years old. In 2020, it was not held due to COVID-19 pandemic.

The team captured their first 3x3 U23 World Cup title in 2024.

== Tournament record ==
=== FIBA 3x3 U23 World Cup ===
Year	Result	Position	Pld	W	L
(China) 2018	Did not qualify				
(China) 2019	Did not qualify				
(Romania) 2022	Runners-up	2nd	7	6	1
(Poland) 2023	Preliminary round	11th	4	2	2
(Mongolia) 2024	Champions	1st	7	7	0
(China) 2025	Quarterfinals	7th	5	3	2
(China) 2026	Champions	1st	7	6	1
Total	2 Titles	5/7	30	24	6
