= 2022 FIBA 3x3 U23 World Cup – Women's tournament =

Tournament details
- Host country: Romania
- City: Bucharest
- Dates: 5–9 October
- Teams: 20

Final positions
- Champions: France (1st title)
- Runners-up: United States
- Third place: Netherlands
- Fourth place: China

Tournament statistics
- MVP: (France) Anna Ngo Ndjock

The 2022 FIBA 3x3 U23 World Cup – Women's tournament is the 3rd edition of this championship. The event was held in Bucharest, Romania. It was contested by 20 teams. Japan are the defending champions.

France won their first title with a win against United States in the final.

== Host selection ==
Bucharest was given the hosting rights on 24 January 2022.

== Teams ==
Africa

- Egypt

Americas

- Chile
- Dominican Republic
- United States

Asia and Oceania

- China
- Chinese Taipei
- Japan
- Mongolia
- Sri Lanka
- Uzbekistan

Europe

- Austria
- France
- Germany
- Hungary
- Israel
- Lithuania
- Netherlands
- Poland
- Romania (hosts)
- Ukraine

== Seeding ==
The pools were announced on 2 October 2022.

The seeding and groups were as follows:

Pool A	Pool B	Pool C	Pool D
France (1); Romania (8) (H); Egypt (9); Ukraine (16); Chile (17)	China (2); Lithuania (7); Poland (10); Israel (15); Chinese Taipei (19)	Mongolia (3); Japan (6); United States (11); Dominican Republic (14); Uzbekistan (18)	Germany (4); Netherlands (5); Hungary (12); Austria (13); Sri Lanka (20)

== Venue ==
The venue is inside the Bucharest Metropolitan Circus, which also hosted the 2018 FIBA 3x3 Europe Cup.

== Preliminary round ==
=== Pool A ===
Pos	Team	Pld	W	L	PF	PA	PD	Qualification	(France)	(Ukraine)	(Romania)	(Chile)	(Egypt)
1	France	4	4	0	87	31	+56	Quarterfinals		22–6	21–14		
2	Ukraine	4	3	1	54	57	−3	Quarterfinals			15–13 OT	17–13	
3	Romania (H)	4	2	2	64	60	+4					17–14 OT	20–10
4	Chile	4	1	3	47	70	−23		3–22				17–14
5	Egypt	4	0	4	41	75	−34		8–22	9–16			

Source: FIBA
Rules for classification: 1) Wins; 2) Head-to-head record; 3) Points scored.
(H) Hosts

=== Pool B ===
Pos	Team	Pld	W	L	PF	PA	PD	Qualification	(China)	(Poland)	(Lithuania)	(Chinese Taipei)	(Israel)
1	China	4	4	0	81	40	+41	Quarterfinals			21–4		21–7
2	Poland	4	3	1	74	58	+16	Quarterfinals	15–18				20–11
3	Lithuania	4	2	2	58	68	−10			14–20		21–14	
4	Chinese Taipei	4	1	3	61	70	−9		14–21	15–19			
5	Israel	4	0	4	40	78	−38				13–19	9–18	

Source: FIBA
Rules for classification: 1) Wins; 2) Head-to-head record; 3) Points scored.

=== Pool C ===
Pos	Team	Pld	W	L	PF	PA	PD	Qualification	(United States)	(Japan)	(Mongolia)	(Dominican Republic)	(Uzbekistan)
1	United States	4	4	0	84	32	+52	Quarterfinals			21–12	21–1	
2	Japan	4	3	1	78	52	+26	Quarterfinals	14–20				22–9
3	Mongolia	4	2	2	67	60	+7			12–21		22–14	
4	Dominican Republic	4	1	3	39	76	−37			11–21			13–12
5	Uzbekistan	4	0	4	30	78	−48		5–22		4–21		

Source: FIBA
Rules for classification: 1) Wins; 2) Head-to-head record; 3) Points scored.

=== Pool D ===
Pos	Team	Pld	W	L	PF	PA	PD	Qualification	(Netherlands)	(Hungary)	(Germany)	(Austria)	(Sri Lanka)
1	Netherlands	4	4	0	77	47	+30	Quarterfinals				21–14	22–2
2	Hungary	4	3	1	75	49	+26	Quarterfinals	16–17				22–6
3	Germany	4	2	2	68	52	+16		15–17	17–18 OT			
4	Austria	4	1	3	59	61	−2			9–19	14–15		
5	Sri Lanka	4	0	4	17	87	−70				3–21	6–22	

Source: FIBA
Rules for classification: 1) Wins; 2) Head-to-head record; 3) Points scored.

== Knockout stage ==
All times are local.

Quarter-finals
9 October – 13:10
France	21
Japan	13
9 October – 13:35
Netherlands	21
Poland	15
9 October – 15:00
China	21
Hungary	12
9 October – 15:25
United States	21
Ukraine	10

Semi-finals
9 October – 16:50
France	20
Netherlands	16
9 October – 17:15
China	10
United States	15

Final
9 October – 20:10
France	21
United States	18
Bronze medal
9 October – 18:50
Netherlands	21
China	18

== Final standings ==
=== Tiebreakers ===
- 1) Wins
- 2) Points scored
- 3) Seeding

Pos	Team	Pld	W	L	W%	PF	PA
1	France	7	7	0	100%	149	21.3
2	United States	7	6	1	86%	138	19.7
3	Netherlands	7	6	1	86%	135	19.3
4	China	7	5	2	71%	130	18.6
5	Japan	5	3	2	60%	91	18.2
6	Poland	5	3	2	60%	89	17.8
7	Hungary	5	3	2	60%	87	17.4
8	Ukraine	5	3	2	60%	64	12.8
9	Germany	4	2	2	50%	68	17.0
10	Mongolia	4	2	2	50%	67	16.8
11	Romania	4	2	2	50%	64	16.0
12	Lithuania	4	2	2	50%	58	14.5
13	Chinese Taipei	4	1	3	25%	61	15.3
14	Austria	4	1	3	25%	59	14.8
15	Chile	4	1	3	25%	47	11.8
16	Dominican Republic	4	1	3	25%	39	9.8
17	Egypt	4	0	4	0%	41	10.3
18	Israel	4	0	4	0%	40	10.0
19	Uzbekistan	4	0	4	0%	30	7.5
20	Sri Lanka	4	0	4	0%	17	4.3

== Awards ==
Team of the tournament
(France) Todd Blanchfield	(United States) Lexie Hull	(Netherlands) Julia Jorritsma
Most valuable player
(France) Anna Ngo Ndjock
Top scorer
(United States) Lexie Hull (63 points)

== See also ==
- 2022 FIBA 3x3 U23 World Cup – Men's tournament
- 2022 FIBA 3x3 World Cup – Men's tournament
- 2022 FIBA 3x3 World Cup – Women's tournament
- 2022 FIBA 3x3 U18 World Cup
- 2022 FIBA 3x3 AmeriCup
- 2022 FIBA 3x3 Africa Cup
- 2022 FIBA 3x3 U17 Africa Cup
- 2022 FIBA 3x3 Asia Cup
- 2022 FIBA 3x3 Europe Cup
