= 2022 FIBA 3x3 U23 World Cup – Men's tournament =

Tournament details
- Host country: Romania
- City: Bucharest
- Dates: 5–9 October
- Teams: 20

Final positions
- Champions: Poland (1st title)
- Runners-up: Serbia
- Third place: France
- Fourth place: Lithuania

Tournament statistics
- MVP: (Poland) Mateusz Szlachetka

The 2022 FIBA 3x3 U23 World Cup – Men's tournament is the 3rd edition of this championship. The event was held in Bucharest, Romania. It was contested by 20 teams. Russia are the defending champions.

Poland won their first title with a win against Serbia in the final.

== Host selection ==
Bucharest was given the hosting rights on 24 January 2022.

== Teams ==
Africa

- Egypt

Americas

- Brazil
- Chile

Asia and Oceania

- China
- Chinese Taipei
- Japan
- Kazakhstan
- Mongolia
- Qatar

Europe

- France
- Germany
- Israel
- Latvia
- Lithuania
- Poland
- Netherlands
- Romania (hosts)
- Serbia
- Slovakia
- Ukraine

== Seeding ==
The pools were announced on 2 October 2022.

The seeding and groups were as follows:

Pool A	Pool B	Pool C	Pool D
Mongolia (1); China (8); Latvia (10); Slovakia (16); Chile (17)	Lithuania (2); Japan (5); Romania (9) (H); Egypt (13); Chinese Taipei (18)	France (3); Poland (7); Netherlands (11); Ukraine (15); Brazil (19)	Israel (4); Germany (6); Serbia (12); Qatar (14); Kazakhstan (20)

== Venue ==
The venue is inside the Bucharest Metropolitan Circus, which also hosted the 2018 FIBA 3x3 Europe Cup.

== Preliminary round ==
=== Pool A ===
Pos	Team	Pld	W	L	PF	PA	PD	Qualification	(Latvia)	(China)	(Mongolia)	(Chile)	(Slovakia)
1	Latvia	4	4	0	81	63	+18	Quarterfinals			17–16 OT		20–17
2	China	4	3	1	78	64	+14	Quarterfinals	20–22			17–14	
3	Mongolia	4	2	2	72	65	+7			18–20			21–14
4	Chile	4	1	3	57	69	−12		10–22		14–17		
5	Slovakia	4	0	4	54	81	−27			10–21		13–19	

Source: FIBA
Rules for classification: 1) Wins; 2) Head-to-head record; 3) Points scored.

=== Pool B ===
Pos	Team	Pld	W	L	PF	PA	PD	Qualification	(Lithuania)	(Japan)	(Egypt)	(Romania)	(Chinese Taipei)
1	Lithuania	4	4	0	82	63	+19	Quarterfinals		21–17	19–17 OT		
2	Japan	4	3	1	83	61	+22	Quarterfinals				22–15	22–12
3	Egypt	4	2	2	72	67	+5			13–22			21–12
4	Romania (H)	4	1	3	63	76	−13		13–22		14–21		
5	Chinese Taipei	4	0	4	51	84	−33		16–20			11–21	

Source: FIBA
Rules for classification: 1) Wins; 2) Head-to-head record; 3) Points scored.
(H) Hosts

=== Pool C ===
Pos	Team	Pld	W	L	PF	PA	PD	Qualification	(Poland)	(France)	(Ukraine)	(Netherlands)	(Brazil)
1	Poland	4	3 (Note: Poland 19–16 France)	1	80	67	+13	Quarterfinals				21–17	19–22
2	France	4	3	1	80	59	+21	Quarterfinals	16–19		22–9		
3	Ukraine	4	2	2	53	64	−11		12–21				19–13
4	Netherlands	4	1 (Note: Netherlands 15–11 Brazil)	3	58	66	−8			18–21	8–13		
5	Brazil	4	1	3	59	74	−15			13–21		11–15	

Source: FIBA
Rules for classification: 1) Wins; 2) Head-to-head record; 3) Points scored.

=== Pool D ===
Pos	Team	Pld	W	L	PF	PA	PD	Qualification	(Serbia)	(Germany)	(Israel)	(Qatar)	(Kazakhstan)
1	Serbia	4	4	0	86	66	+20	Quarterfinals			22–19	22–16	
2	Germany	4	3	1	70	50	+20	Quarterfinals	15–21				22–13
3	Israel	4	2	2	70	55	+15			7–11		22–12	
4	Qatar	4	1	3	58	83	−25			9–22			21–17
5	Kazakhstan	4	0	4	56	86	−30		16–21		10–22		

Source: FIBA
Rules for classification: 1) Wins; 2) Head-to-head record; 3) Points scored.

== Knockout stage ==
All times are local.

Quarter-finals
9 October – 14:00
Latvia	20
France	17
9 October – 14:25
Serbia	20
Japan	17
9 October – 15:50
Lithuania	21
Germany	14
9 October – 16:15
Poland	21
China	17

Semi-finals
9 October – 17:50
France	15
Serbia	17
9 October – 18:15
Lithuania	18
Poland	21

Final
9 October – 20:35
Serbia	20
Poland	21
Bronze medal
9 October – 19:15
France	21
Lithuania	17

== Final standings ==
=== Tiebreakers ===
- 1) Wins
- 2) Points scored
- 3) Seeding

Pos	Team	Pld	W	L	W%	PF	PA
1	Poland	7	6	1	86%	143	20.4
2	Serbia	7	6	1	86%	143	20.4
3	France	7	5	2	71%	137	19.6
4	Lithuania	7	5	2	71%	138	19.7
5	Latvia	5	4	1	80%	91	18.2
6	Japan	5	3	2	60%	100	20.0
7	China	5	3	2	60%	95	19.0
8	Germany	5	3	2	60%	94	16.8
9	Mongolia	4	2	2	50%	72	18.0
10	Egypt	4	2	2	50%	72	18.0
11	Israel	4	2	2	50%	70	17.5
12	Ukraine	4	2	2	50%	53	13.3
13	Romania	4	1	3	25%	63	15.8
14	Brazil	4	1	3	25%	59	14.8
15	Netherlands	4	1	3	25%	58	14.5
16	Qatar	4	1	3	25%	58	14.5
17	Chile	4	1	3	25%	57	14.3
18	Kazakhstan	4	0	4	0%	56	14.0
19	Slovakia	4	0	4	0%	54	13.5
20	Chinese Taipei	4	0	4	0%	51	12.8

== Awards ==
Team of the tournament
(Poland) Mateusz Szlachetka	(France) Lorenzo Thirouard-Samson	(Serbia) Nikola Kovacevic
Most valuable player
(Poland) Mateusz Szlachetka
Top scorer
(France) Lorenzo Thirouard-Samson (53 points)

== See also ==
- 2022 FIBA 3x3 U23 World Cup – Women's tournament
- 2022 FIBA 3x3 World Cup – Men's tournament
- 2022 FIBA 3x3 World Cup – Women's tournament
- 2022 FIBA 3x3 U18 World Cup
- 2022 FIBA 3x3 AmeriCup
- 2022 FIBA 3x3 Africa Cup
- 2022 FIBA 3x3 U17 Africa Cup
- 2022 FIBA 3x3 Asia Cup
- 2022 FIBA 3x3 Europe Cup
