= Daniel Snyder =

American businessman (born 1964)

Dan Snyder
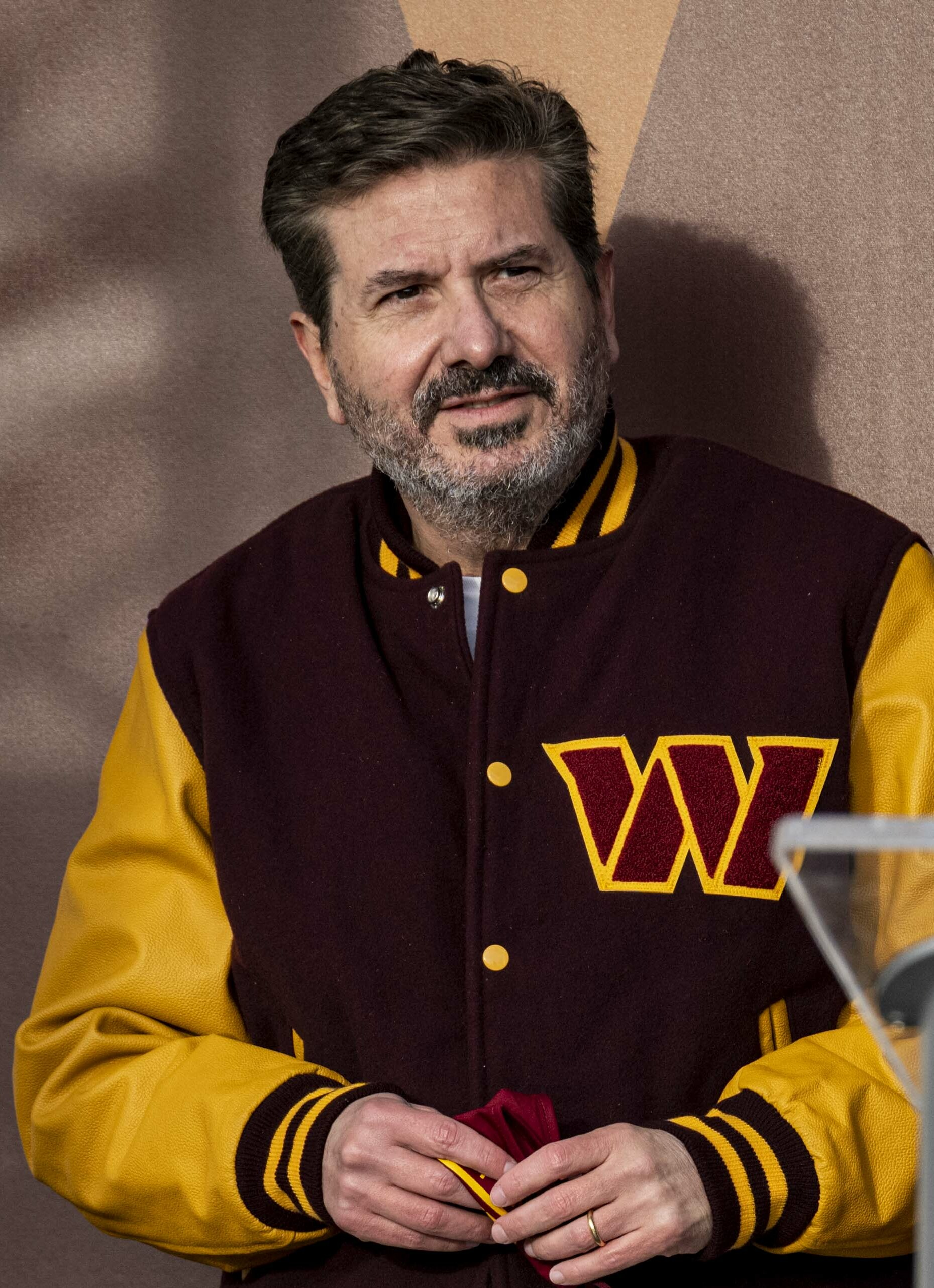
- Snyder as Washington Commanders owner in 2022
- Born: Daniel Marc Snyder; November 23, 1964 (age 61); Silver Spring, Maryland, U.S.
- Education: University of Maryland
- Occupations: Businessman; sports team owner
- Known for: Owning the Washington Commanders (1999–2023)
- Spouse: Tanya Snyder
- Children: 3

Daniel Marc Snyder (born November 23, 1964) is an American businessman and former owner of the Washington Commanders, an American football franchise belonging to the National Football League (NFL). He founded the marketing company Snyder Communications in 1989, amassing a wealth that led him to buy the Commanders, then known as the Redskins, from Jack Kent Cooke's estate in 1999 for $800 million. Snyder is widely considered among the worst owners in the history of professional sports, with the team marred by several controversies, and managing six playoff appearances, four division titles, and two playoff victories during his 24 years of ownership. Among the controversies under his leadership was his long-time refusal to change the controversial Redskins name, allegations of sexual harassment within the organization, a toxic workplace culture, and other financial issues.

In the early 2020s, Snyder was investigated by the House Committee on Oversight and Government Reform for allegations of sexual harassment and enabling a toxic workplace culture with the Commanders, and by state and federal agencies for illegally withholding security deposits from season ticket holders and offering hush money to accusors. Amid financial issues and increasing pressure from the NFL, Snyder sold the Commanders in 2023 to a group headed by Josh Harris for $6.05 billion, the largest sports team sale at the time. Snyder has lived in London since 2022.

== Early life ==
Snyder was born on November 23, 1964, in Silver Spring, Maryland. The son of Arlette (née Amsellem) and Gerald Snyder, he was raised in a Jewish household. Gerald was a freelance writer who wrote for United Press International and National Geographic. At age 12, Snyder moved to Henley-on-Thames, a small town near London, where he attended private school. Snyder returned to the United States two years later and lived with his grandmother in Queens, New York. At age 15, his family moved to Rockville, Maryland, where Snyder graduated from Charles W. Woodward High School.

Snyder's first job was at a B. Dalton bookstore in White Flint Mall. By age 20, he had dropped out of the University of Maryland, College Park and was running his own business, leasing jets to fly college students to spring break in Fort Lauderdale and the Caribbean. Snyder claimed to have earned US$1 million running the business with a friend out of his parents' apartment.

Snyder courted real estate entrepreneur Mortimer Zuckerman, whose U.S. News & World Report was also interested in the college market and who agreed to finance his push to publish Campus USA, a magazine for college students. Zuckerman and Fred Drasner, co-publisher of Zuckerman's New York Daily News, invested $3 million in Campus USA. The venture closed after two years.

== Career ==
With an investment from his father, Snyder and his sister Michele founded the marketing company Snyder Communications in 1988. They concentrated on wallboards in doctors' offices and colleges. They combined the advertisements with the distribution of product samples, such as soaps and packages of medicine, to differentiate themselves from their competitors. Snyder continued to expand its activities to different aspects of outsourced marketing. In 1992, the company expanded into telemarketing with a focus on the immigrant market. Revenues rose from $2.7 million in 1991 to $9 million in 1993.

Snyder became the youngest CEO of a New York Stock Exchange listed company at the age of 32 when it underwent an initial public offering in September 1996. His top investors, including media mogul Barry Diller and Robert Strauss, earned significant returns on their initial investment. Mortimer Zuckerman and Fred Drasner, whom Snyder owed $3 million from the failure of his first business venture, were given company stock, which ended up being worth over $500 million. His parents sold their stock in the company for over $60 million.

Snyder continued to expand the company through a string of acquisitions, such as Arnold Worldwide in 1997. By 1998, the company had over 12,000 employees and $1 billion in annual revenues. In April 2000, Snyder Communications was sold to the French advertising and marketing services group Havas in an all-stock transaction valued at in excess of $2 billion. Snyder's personal share of the proceeds was estimated to be $300 million.

=== Washington Redskins / Football Team / Commanders ownership (1999–2023) ===
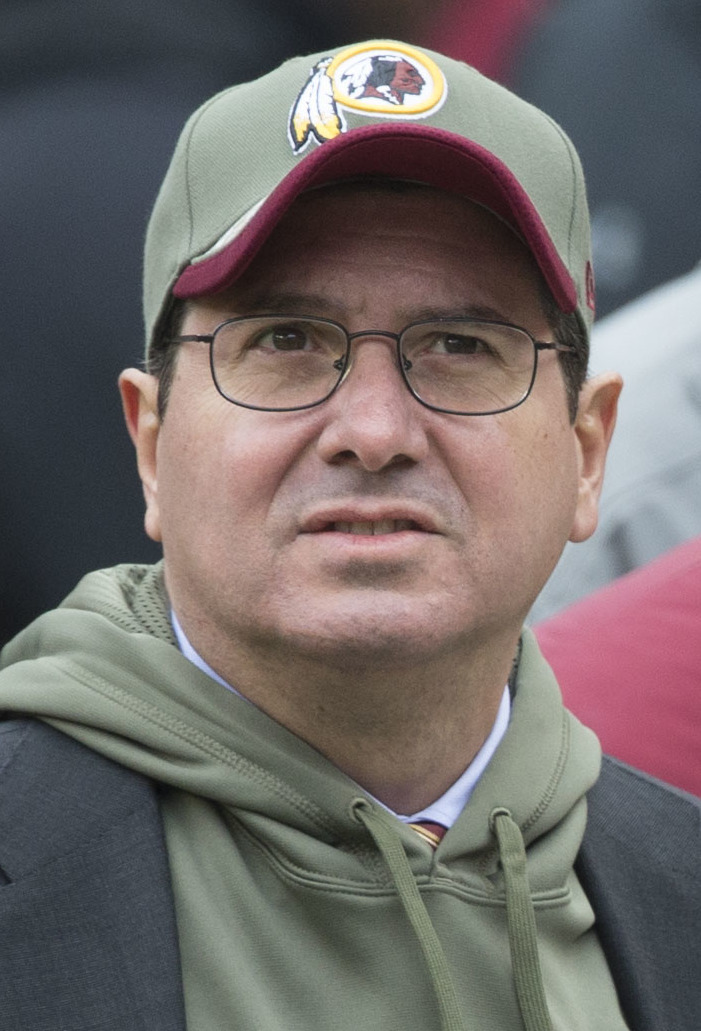
Snyder in 2014

In May 1999, Snyder purchased the Washington Redskins and Jack Kent Cooke Stadium for $800 million from the estate of Jack Kent Cooke, the team's former owner who died in 1997. At the time, it was the most expensive transaction in sporting history. The deal was financed largely through borrowed money, including $340 million borrowed from Société Générale and $155 million debt assumed on the stadium. To pay down the team's debt, in 2003, he sold 15% of the team to real estate developer Dwight Schar for $200 million, 15% to Florida financier Robert Rothman for a like amount; and 5% to FedEx founder Frederick W. Smith, leaving him with a 65% ownership interest. Over the years, Snyder served on the NFL's broadcast, business ventures, digital media, international, stadium, and Hall of Fame committees.

In late December 2019, Snyder announced that team president Bruce Allen and several other front office members were fired after a dismal 3–13 season.

In 2020, Snyder blocked the minority owners from selling their combined 35% ownership stake to an outside party by exercising his right of first refusal, only offering to buy back the 20% held by Rothman and Smith but not the 15% owned by Schar.

In March 2021, after a period of litigation, the league approved Snyder for a debt waiver of $450 million to acquire the remaining ownership stake held by the three in a deal worth about $875 million. Due to financial problems and increasing pressure from the NFL and other parties, he hired BofA Securities in November 2022 to explore selling the team. Snyder began negotiating with a group headed by Josh Harris in April 2023, and agreed in May to sell the franchise for $6.05 billion. The deal was unanimously approved by other NFL owners on July 20, 2023, and closed the following day.

== Other ventures ==
Snyder owned expansion rights to an Arena Football League team for the Washington, D.C., market before the 2009 demise of the original league. He purchased the rights to the team for $4 million in 1999. The team was going to be called the Washington Warriors and play their games at the Comcast Center in 2003 but the team never started.

In 2005, Snyder bought 12% of the stock of amusement park operator Six Flags through his private equity company RedZone Capital. He later gained control of the board, placing his friend and ESPN executive Mark Shapiro as CEO and himself as chairman. In April 2009, the New York Stock Exchange delisted Six Flags' stock as it had fallen below the minimal market capitalization. Two months later, Six Flags announced that the company was delaying a $15 million debt payment and two weeks later, Six Flags filed for Chapter 11 bankruptcy protection. As part of the reorganization, 92% of the company ended up in the hands of their lenders, with Snyder and Shapiro being removed from their positions.

In July 2006, Snyder launched Red Zebra Broadcasting with the purchase of a trio of sports radio stations in Washington, D.C. He purchased three other radio stations in the mid-Atlantic region, and broadcast coverage of Redskins games on all of his stations. In 2017 and 2018, Red Zebra sold off all of its radio stations and ceased doing business.

Also in July 2006, Snyder and other investors signed a deal to provide financing to the production company run by Tom Cruise and his partner, Paula Wagner. This came one week after Paramount Pictures severed its ties with Cruise and Wagner. Snyder is credited as an executive producer for the 2008 movie Valkyrie, which starred Cruise.

In February 2007, it was announced that Snyder's private equity firm Red Zone Capital Management would purchase Johnny Rockets, the 1950s-themed diner chain. RedZone Capital Management sold the company to Sun Capital Partners in 2013. From 2007 to 2012, Snyder also owned entertainment company Dick Clark Productions.

Snyder is a backer of the film production company Kinematics, which was founded by filmmaker Mark H. Rapaport. The production company financed the 2024 film The Apprentice, which is a portrayal of Donald Trump early in his business and real estate career in New York City. According to ESPN sources, Snyder invested in the film believing it would portray Trump favorably. When the film was screened in his home in February 2024, Snyder reportedly became upset about the negative portrayal of Trump. The film was shelved before Kinematics sold its stake in the film in the summer of 2024.

== Reception and controversies ==
Snyder is widely considered to be one of the worst owners in the history of North American professional sports. Under his ownership, the team had a regular season record of 164–220–2 (.427) with a postseason record of 2–6 (.250), never reaching past the Divisional Round. The media alleged that his managerial style and workplace culture directly affected the team's performance during his tenure as the principal owner. In reflecting on Snyder in 2025, The Washington Post referred to him as "largely forgotten", while Snyder reportedly said that he "fucking hates it" when asked how he felt about seeing Washington win games without him in the 2024 NFL season, where they made their first NFC Championship Game appearance since the 1991 season, eight years before Snyder bought the team.

Under Snyder, the team sued season ticket holders who were unable to pay during the Great Recession in the late 2000s, despite his claim that there were over 200,000 people on the season ticket waiting list. Partway through the 2009 season, Snyder temporarily banned all signs from FedExField, leading to further fan discontentment. Fans also expressed discontentment about the game day experience, rising ticket and parking prices, and Snyder's policy of charging fans for tailgates in special areas of the stadium lot. A 2023 survey conducted by the NFL Players Association ranked Washington as the worst team to play for, with the lowest grades for their team facilities and lack of accommodations for the players and their families.

=== Redskins name ===
In May 2013, in response to a question regarding the team's federal trademark and name, Snyder told the USA Today: "We'll never change the name. It's that simple. NEVER—you can use caps." Snyder refused to meet with Native American advocates for a name change. A pitched public relations battle in 2013 and 2014 led Snyder to employ crisis management and PR firms in an effort to defend the name. Snyder's creation of the Washington Redskins Original Americans Foundation in 2014 was seen by some activists as a disingenuous effort to buy favor from Native American communities.

Following renewed attention to questions of racial justice in wake of the George Floyd protests in 2020, a letter signed by 87 shareholders and investors was sent to team and league sponsors Nike, FedEx, and PepsiCo urging them to cut their ties unless the name was changed. Around the same time, several retail companies had begun removing Redskins merchandise from their stores. In response, the team underwent a review in July 2020 and announced they would be retiring the name, with a new name and logo to be chosen at a later date. As a team rebranding process usually takes over a year, the team temporarily played as the Washington Football Team for the 2020 and 2021 seasons. The name was changed to the Commanders in 2022.

=== Defamation suit ===
Threatening a lawsuit in January 2011, Snyder demanded the dismissal of sports writer Dave McKenna, who had written an article for the Washington City Paper titled "The Cranky Redskins Fan's Guide to Dan Snyder", creating a list of controversies involving Snyder. McKenna had been needling Snyder for years in his columns, and the front-page of the article had a defaced picture of Snyder with devil's horns and a beard, an image Snyder claimed was antisemitic. Other sportswriters have come out in support of McKenna. In a statement released by the Simon Wiesenthal Center, while acknowledging that public figures are fair game for criticism, said the artwork used by the City Paper was reminiscent of "virulent antisemitism going back to the Middle Ages" and urged the City Paper issue an apology. Mike Madden of the City Paper issued a statement saying they take accusations of antisemitism very seriously and said the artwork was meant to "resemble the type of scribbling that teenagers everywhere have been using to deface photos" and the cover art was not an antisemitic caricature. In February, Snyder filed a lawsuit against the City Paper before dropping it in September.

=== Environmental ===
In 2004, Snyder brokered a deal with the National Park Service to remove old growth trees from the 200 feet (61 m) of national parkland behind his home to grant him a better view of the Potomac River, on the condition that Snyder would replace the trees with 600 native saplings. Lenn Harley, a real estate broker who was not involved in Snyder's purchase of the estate but was familiar with the area, estimated that the relatively unobstructed view of the river and its surroundings that resulted from Snyder's clearing could add $500,000 to $1 million to his $10 million home's value. The clearcutting was started without approval from Montgomery County, Maryland, and without environmental assessments, as required by law. As a result, Snyder was fined $100 by the Maryland-National Capital Park and Planning Commission in December 2004. Snyder's neighbors also filed complaints regarding his clearcutting of scenic and historic easements behind his home.

The NPS ranger who investigated the complaints of Snyder's neighbors and clearcutting along the Potomac was transferred multiple times due to his continued pursuit of the complaints and the Snyder property. Eventually, the NPS ranger filed a whistleblower complaint regarding the Snyder case. Later, the ranger's anonymity as a whistleblower was lost, potentially leading to extreme harassment and a trial of the park ranger, ultimately ending the ranger's career.

=== Workplace culture ===
In July 2020, The Washington Post published a series of articles alleging that over 40 women who were former employees of the organization, including office workers and cheerleaders, had been sexually harassed and discriminated against by Snyder and other male executives, colleagues, and players of the team since at least 2006. That December, it was also reported that Snyder had settled a sexual harassment claim with a former female employee for a sum of $1.6 million. The alleged incident had occurred on his private plane while returning from the Academy of Country Music Awards in 2009. Two private investigations at the time, hired by the team and an outside law firm, failed to substantiate the woman's claim, and it was reported that Snyder paid the sum to avoid any negative publicity. A year-long independent investigation into the team's workplace culture, led by lawyer Beth Wilkinson, was concluded in July 2021. It found that incidents of sexual harassment, bullying, and intimidation were commonplace throughout the organization under his ownership. The NFL fined the team $10 million in response, with Snyder also voluntarily stepping down from running the team's day-to-day operations for a few months, giving those responsibilities to his wife Tanya Snyder.

On July 28, 2022, Snyder voluntarily testified before the congressional House Committee on Oversight and Reform regarding its investigation into Washington's workplace misconduct. Following a 14-month probe, the Oversight and Reform committee published a report in December 2022 that found that Snyder gave "misleading" answers when he testified about his team's workplace issues. The report also accused Snyder of paying former employees hush money so they would not come forward with their allegations of abuse, which included "sexual misconduct, exploitation of women, bullying of men, and other inappropriate behavior," describing it as "commonplace, and that he was a hands-on owner who had a role in nearly every organizational decision." The report also stated the NFL "has not protected workers from sexual harassment and abuse." Former cheerleader Melanie Coburn testified before Congress that she was sexually harassed up to 200 times during her employment with the team, with a former video production manager for the team testifying that Snyder requested that lewd footage of a cheerleader photo shoot, without their consent, be compiled into a video. Snyder was also alleged to have hired private investigators to gather damaging information on team and NFL employees, including commissioner Roger Goodell and other team owners.

=== Financial improprieties ===
In 2021, the U.S. House Oversight Committee looked into reports that Snyder may have under reported ticket sales to the league, a move that would have allowed him to keep more ticket revenue. On April 12, 2022, the Committee sent a letter to the Federal Trade Commission alleging Snyder had been keeping two separate financial ledgers since at least 2012: one that he would submit to the NFL and one that showed the actual numbers, which were much different. Congress also alleged that Snyder would drive up prices by selling cheaper tickets in bulk to third-party vendors, causing the remaining tickets to become far more expensive. This would in turn force fans who wanted to attend games at FedExField to either join an expensive waiting list or buy expensive tickets.

A criminal inquiry by the Attorney's Office for the Eastern District of Virginia alleged that Snyder possibly committed bank fraud after learning he was granted a $55 million line of credit in November 2018 without the knowledge and permission of the team's board of directors. In February 2023, a federal grand jury issued subpoenas for a cache of documents related to the team's finances.

In October 2022, attorney general of Washington, D.C. Karl Racine filed a consumer protection lawsuit against Snyder and the NFL. The criminal inquiry began after the US House Committee on Oversight and Accountability sent a letter to the Federal Trade Commission detailing that it had found evidence of deceptive business practices over the span of more than a decade, including withholding ticket revenue from visiting teams and refundable deposits from fans.

A $55 million loan became the primary focus of federal prosecutors, which initially was discovered as a footnote in an April 2020 financial report. The team had taken out the credit line 16 months earlier without the knowledge and required approval of Snyder's minority partners, Robert Rothman, Dwight Schar, and Frederick W. Smith, who owned 40% of the team collectively. Bank of America officials repeatedly asked team executives for proof that the board had approved the loan, but team executives ignored all requests before the loan closed. According to arbitration documents, the partners demanded that the NFL investigate the origin of Snyder's loan, yet neither NFL commissioner Roger Goodell nor the NFL arbitrator investigated the allegations. Four days after the partners asked the NFL to seek proof that the loan was legally obtained, the NFL shut down arbitration proceedings.

== Personal life ==
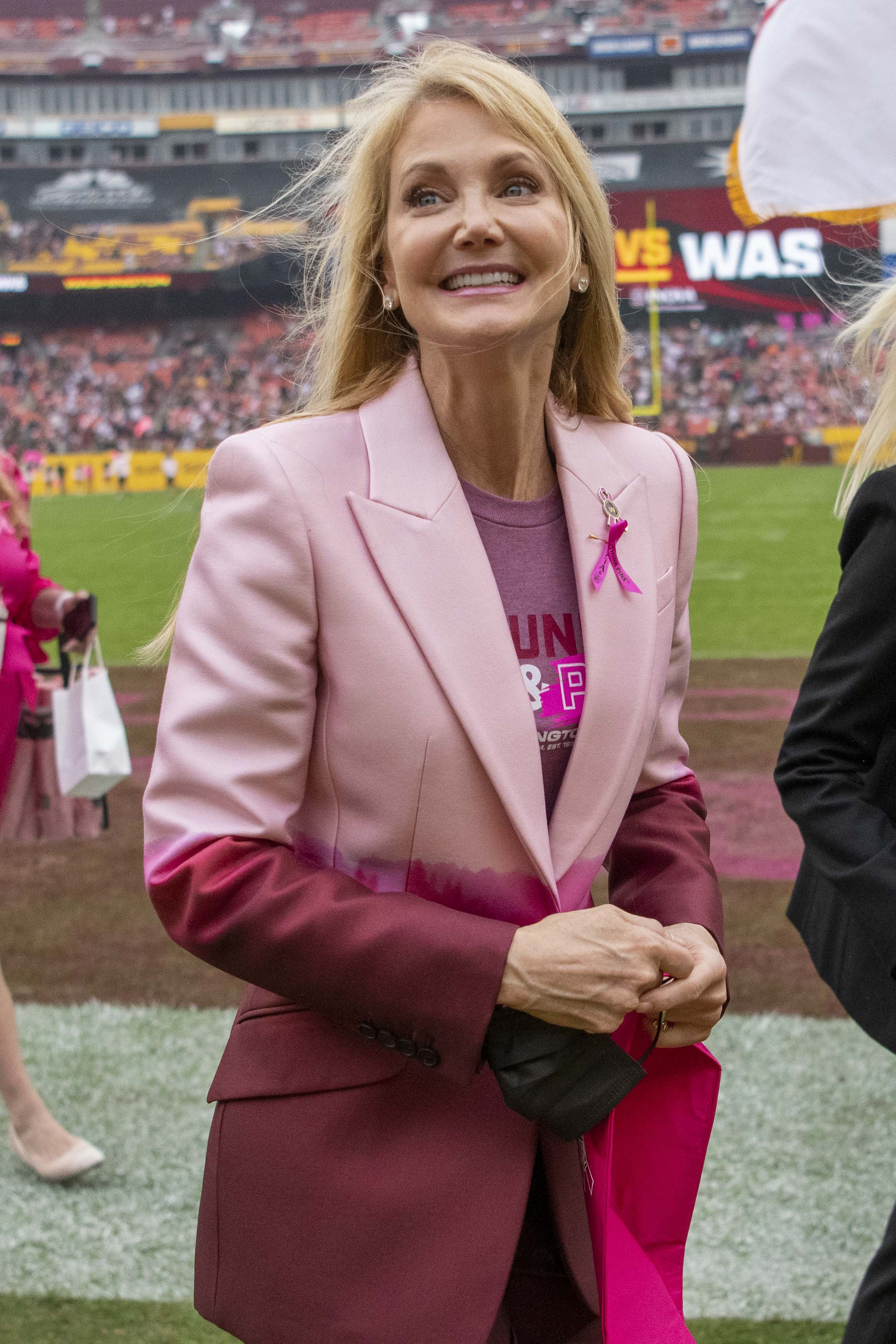
Snyder's wife Tanya at FedExField, 2021

In 1994, Snyder married Tanya Ivey, a former fashion model from Atlanta. She is a national spokesperson for breast cancer awareness and was named co-CEO of the team in 2021. They have three children. In 2001, Snyder had surgery to remove a cancerous thyroid gland. In November 2022, he incorporated a private limited company in London that listed his residency in England.

Snyder contributed $1 million to victims of the September 11 attacks and $600,000 to victims of Hurricane Katrina in 2005. He paid shipping costs for charitable food shipments to those affected by the 2004 tsunami in Indonesia and Thailand. In 2016, following Hurricane Matthew, Snyder dispatched his private plane to provide emergency supplies in the Bahamas and medical supplies to Bernard Mevs Hospital in Port-au-Prince.

In 2000, Snyder founded the Washington Redskins Charitable Foundation. He has been a long-time supporter of Youth For Tomorrow, an organization founded by former Redskins head coach and Pro Football Hall of Famer Joe Gibbs. In April 2010, the organization presented Snyder with its Distinguished Leader Award. In 2005, Snyder was inducted as a member of the Greater Washington Jewish Sports Hall of Fame. He owns a private plane, a Bombardier BD-700 Global Express XRS.

In 2014, Snyder formed the Washington Redskins Original Americans Foundation to provide opportunities and resources to aid Tribal communities. The foundation was formed to address the challenges in the daily lives of Native Americans. Snyder has also supported Children's National Hospital, the National Center for Missing and Exploited Children (NCMEC), and other organizations. In May 2014, Snyder and Tanya received the Charles B. Wang International Children's Award from the NCMEC. He contributed $100,000 to Donald Trump's 2020 presidential campaign and $300,000 to humanitarian aid organizations for people affected by the Russian invasion of Ukraine in 2022.

In March 2024, Snyder donated his 30,000 sq. ft. mansion in Potomac, Maryland, to the American Cancer Society (ACS) after being unable to find a buyer. The property, known as River House as it overlooks the Potomac River, was purchased from the estate of King Hussein and Queen Noor of Jordan in 2001 for $8.64 million. The ACS plans to sell the property and use the proceeds to support its mission of improving the lives of cancer patients and their families.
