= 2024 FIBA 3x3 U23 World Cup – Women's tournament =

Tournament details
- Host country: Mongolia
- City: Ulaanbaatar
- Dates: 11–15 September
- Teams: 20

Final positions
- Champions: United States (1st title)
- Runners-up: Netherlands
- Third place: China
- Fourth place: Germany

Tournament statistics
- MVP: (United States) Sania Feagin

The 2024 FIBA 3x3 U23 World Cup – Women's tournament is the 5th edition of this championship. The event was held in Ulaanbaatar, Mongolia. It was contested by 20 teams. Netherlands are the defending champions.

United States won their first title with a win against Netherlands in the final.

== Host selection ==
During the 2022 FIBA 3x3 World Cup in Antwerp, FIBA signed an agreement with the Mongolian Basketball Association to host future 3x3 events in 2023 and 2024; including the 2024 FIBA U23 World Cup.

== Teams ==
Africa

- Egypt
- Kenya
- Uganda
- Benin

Americas

- Chile
- United States

Asia and Oceania

- China
- Japan
- Mongolia (hosts)
- New Zealand

Europe

- France
- Germany
- Hungary
- Italy
- Netherlands
- Poland
- Spain
- Austria
- Ukraine
- Israel

== Seeding ==
The seeding and groups were as follows:

Pool A	Pool B	Pool C	Pool D
China (1); Hungary (8); Ukraine (9); Austria (16); Benin (17)	United States (2); Japan (7); Spain (10) (H); Italy (15); New Zealand (18)	Germany (3); Mongolia (6) (Hosts); Poland (11); Israel (14); Kenya (19)	France (4); Egypt (5) (Hosts); Netherlands (12); Chile (13); Uganda (20)

== Venue ==
The venue was at the Sükhbaatar Square in Ulaanbaatar.

== Preliminary round ==
=== Pool A ===
Pos	Team	Pld	W	L	PF	PA	PD	Qualification	(Hungary)	(China)	(Ukraine)	(Austria)	(Benin)
1	Hungary	4	4	0	69	36	+33	Quarterfinals			18–9		19–5
2	China	4	3	1	70	63	+7	Quarterfinals	13–16			20–18 OT	
3	Ukraine	4	2	2	51	57	−6			18–19		12–9	
4	Austria	4	1	3	48	56	−8		9–16				12–8
5	Benin	4	0	4	35	61	−26			11–18	11–12		

Source: FIBA
Rules for classification: 1) Wins; 2) Head-to-head record; 3) Points scored.

=== Pool B ===
Pos	Team	Pld	W	L	PF	PA	PD	Qualification	(United States)	(Spain)	(Japan)	(Italy)	(New Zealand)
1	United States	4	4	0	81	58	+23	Quarterfinals			21–14	21–14	
2	Spain	4	2	2	74	70	+4	Quarterfinals	17–18			21–12	
3	Japan	4	2	2	69	66	+3			21–15			21–16
4	Italy	4	2	2	61	70	−9				14–13		21–15
5	New Zealand	4	0	4	63	84	−21		13–21	19–21			

Source: FIBA
Rules for classification: 1) Wins; 2) Head-to-head record; 3) Points scored.

=== Pool C ===
Pos	Team	Pld	W	L	PF	PA	PD	Qualification	(Poland)	(Germany)	(Israel)	(Mongolia)	(Kenya)
1	Poland	4	4	0	81	52	+29	Quarterfinals		21–20	18–13		
2	Germany	4	3	1	82	55	+27	Quarterfinals			21–11	20–15	
3	Israel	4	2	2	63	65	−2					18–15	21–11
4	Mongolia (H)	4	1	3	66	64	+2		15–21				21–5
5	Kenya	4	0	4	28	84	−56		4–21	8–21			

Source: FIBA
Rules for classification: 1) Wins; 2) Head-to-head record; 3) Points scored.
(H) Hosts

=== Pool D ===
Pos	Team	Pld	W	L	PF	PA	PD	Qualification	(Netherlands)	(France)	(Egypt)	(Chile)	(Uganda)
1	Netherlands	4	4	0	70	30	+40	Quarterfinals		18–9		17–4	
2	France	4	2	2	65	53	+12	Quarterfinals			21–11	14–16	
3	Egypt	4	2	2	54	57	−3		11–16				18–10
4	Chile	4	2	2	49	52	−3				10–14		19–7
5	Uganda	4	0	4	31	77	−46		6–19	8–21			

Source: FIBA
Rules for classification: 1) Wins; 2) Head-to-head record; 3) Points scored.

== Knockout stage ==
All times are local.

Quarter-finals
15 September 12:00
Hungary	15
Germany	19
15 September 12:25
Netherlands	19
Spain	17
15 September 13:50
Poland	13
China	16
15 September 14:15
United States	21
France	11

Semi-finals
15 September 15:40
Germany	16
Netherlands	17 OT
15 September 16:05
China	10
United States	19

Final
15 September 18:20
Netherlands	15
United States	18
Bronze medal
15 September 17:30
Germany	14
China	20

== Final standings ==
=== Tiebreakers ===
- 1) Wins
- 2) Points scored
- 3) Seeding

Pos	Team	Pld	W	L	W%	PF	PA
1	United States	7	7	0	100%	19.9	139
2	Netherlands	7	6	1	86%	17.3	121
3	China	7	5	2	71%	16.6	116
4	Germany	7	4	3	57%	18.7	131
5	Poland	5	4	1	80%	18.8	94
6	Hungary	5	4	1	80%	16.8	84
7	Spain	5	2	3	40%	18.2	91
8	France	5	2	3	40%	15.2	76
9	Japan	4	2	2	50%	17.3	69
10	Israel	4	2	2	50%	15.8	63
11	Italy	4	2	2	50%	15.3	61
12	Egypt	4	2	2	50%	13.5	54
13	Ukraine	4	2	2	25%	12.8	51
14	Chile	4	2	2	25%	12.3	49
15	Mongolia	4	1	3	25%	16.5	66
16	Austria	4	1	3	25%	12.0	48
17	New Zealand	4	0	4	0%	15.8	63
18	Benin	4	0	4	0%	8.8	35
19	Uganda	4	0	4	0%	7.8	31
20	Kenya	4	0	4	0%	7.0	28

== Awards ==
Team of the tournament
(United States) Sania Feagin	(Netherlands) Liselot Skul	(China) JianPing Zhang
Most valuable player
(United States) Sania Feagin
Top scorer
(United States) Sania Feagin (44 points)
