= Mami Koyama (basketball) =

Japanese basketball player

Mami Koyama 小山真実
No. 10 – Tokyo Dime
- Position: Forward
- League: FIBA 3X3

Personal information
- Born: May 1, 1995 (age 31) Chiba, Chiba
- Listed height: 5 ft 11 in (1.80 m)
- Listed weight: 148 lb (67 kg)

Career information
- High school: Showa Gakuin (Ichikawa, Chiba)
- Playing career: 2014–present

Career history
- 2014-17: JX-Eneos Sunflowers
- 2017-19: Haneda Vickies
- 2019-present: Tokyo Dime

Career highlights
Medals
Women's basketball
Representing Japan
FIBA 3x3 Under-23 World Cup
Silver medal – second place	2018 Xi'an	Japan 3x3

Mami Koyama (小山真実, Koyama Mami; born May 1, 1995) is a Japanese professional basketball player who plays for Tokyo Dime. She also plays for Japan women's national 3x3 team. She brought the U23 national team to a silver medal at the FIBA 3x3 Under-23 World Cup in Xi'an .
