= Sania Feagin =

American basketball player (born 2003)

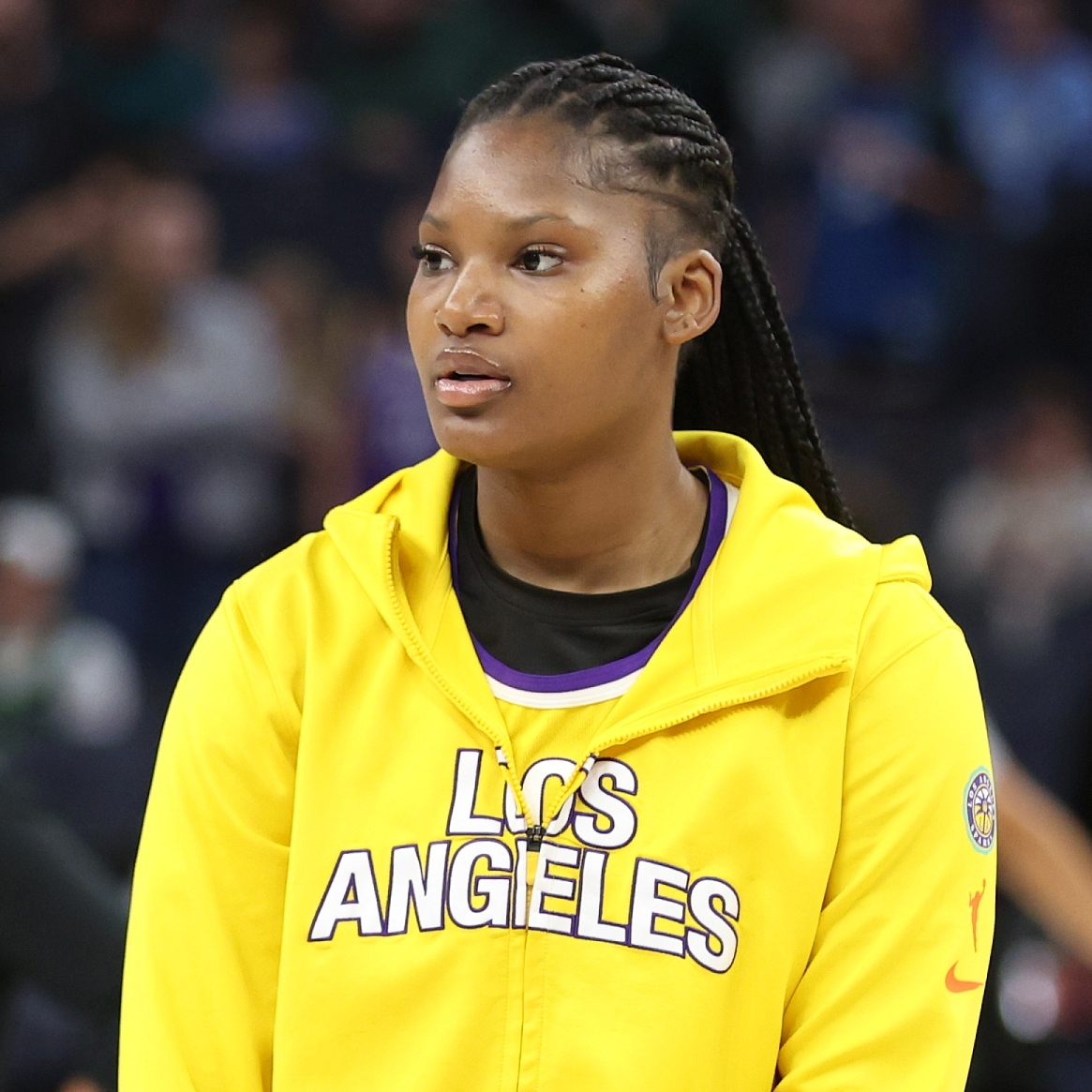
- Feagin with the Los Angeles Sparks in 2025

No. 20 – Portland Fire
- Position: Forward
- League: WNBA

Personal information
- Born: March 15, 2003 (age 23) Decatur, Georgia, U.S.
- Listed height: 6 ft 3 in (1.91 m)

Career information
- High school: Forest Park (Forest Park, Georgia)
- College: South Carolina (2021–2025)
- WNBA draft: 2025: 2nd round, 21st overall pick
- Drafted by: Los Angeles Sparks
- Playing career: 2025–present

Career history
- 2025–2026: Los Angeles Sparks
- 2025–present: Adelaide Lightning
- 2026-present: Portland Fire

Career highlights
- 2× NCAA champion (2022, 2024); SEC All-Defensive Team (2025); FIBA 3x3 U23 Women's World Cup MVP (2024); McDonald's All-American (2021)
- Stats at Basketball Reference
Medals
Women's 3x3 basketball
Representing the United States
FIBA 3x3 Under-23 World Cup
Gold medal – first place	2024 Ulaanbaatar	Team
Women's basketball
Representing the United States
FIBA Under-19 World Cup
Gold medal – first place	2021 Hungary	Team

Sania Nicole Feagin (born March 15, 2003) is an American professional basketball player for the Portland Fire of the Women's National Basketball Association (WNBA) and for the Adelaide Lightning of the Women's National Basketball League (WNBL). She played college basketball at South Carolina.

== High school career ==
Feagin attended Forest Park High School in Forest Park, Georgia. During her freshman year, she averaged 11.6 points, 9.7 rebounds, 1.5 assists, 1.6 steals and 4.0 blocks per game. During her sophomore year, she averaged 13.9 points, 10.1 rebounds, 1.4 assists, 2.2 steals and 3.7 blocks per game. During her junior year, she averaged 17.2 points, 10.4 rebounds, 3.6 blocks, 3.0 steals and 2.5 assists per game, and led Forest Park to the 6A state championship in 2020. Following the season she was named Georgia Gatorade Player of the Year. During her senior year she averaged 18.9 points, 10.3 rebounds and 4.2 blocks per game, and led Forest Park to the 5A state championship runner-up finish in 2021.

She was a four-time All-State selection, including first-team honors as a junior and senior, and was named a 2021 McDonald's All-American. She was a five-star recruit, and ranked the No. 1 forward and No. 4 overall player in the class of 2021 by ESPN. In 2024, her jersey was retired by Forest Park High School.

== College career ==
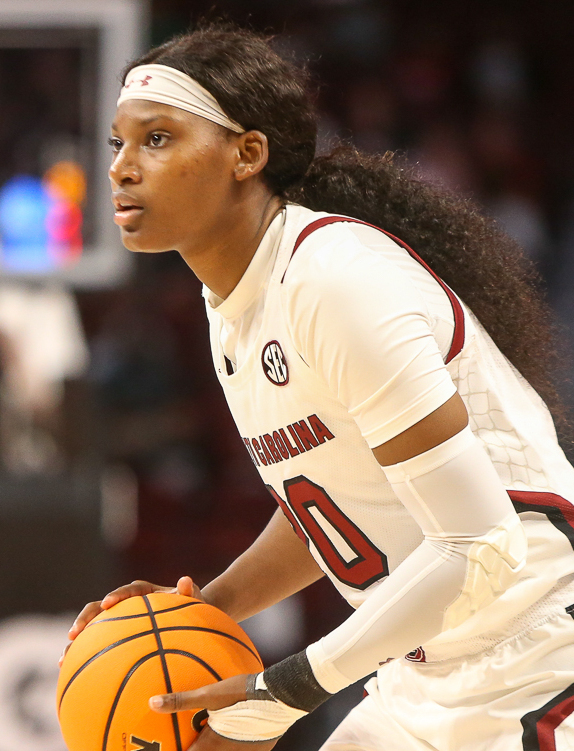
Feagin with South Carolina in 2022

During the 2021–22 season, in her freshman year, she appeared in 31 games and averaged 1.9 points and 1.5 rebounds per game. During the first round of the 2022 NCAA Division I women's basketball tournament against Howard, she posted a season-high 10 points and a season-high seven rebounds in 14 minutes off the bench, and helped South Carolina win their second national championship in program history.

During the 2022–23 season, in her sophomore year, she appeared in 27 games and averaged 4.9 points and 2.4 rebounds per game. During the 2023–24 season, in her junior year, she appeared in 38 games, with three starts, and averaged 6.7 points and 3.8 rebounds per game. She had ten double-figure scoring games, playing a then career-high 15.2 minutes per game. On March 22, 2024, during the first round of the 2024 NCAA Division I women's basketball tournament against Presbyterian, she scored 12 points and ten rebounds for her first career double-double, and helped South Carolina win their third national championship in program history.

During the 2024–25 season, in her senior year, she started all 38 games, and averaged 8.1 points and 4.6 rebounds per game. On February 27, 2025, in a game against Ole Miss she scored a career-high 22 points, with six rebounds and five blocks. During the 2025 SEC women's basketball tournament, she scored 38 points in three games, to help South Carolina win the SEC women's basketball tournament, and earn the conference's automatic bid to the 2025 NCAA Division I women's basketball tournament. She was subsequently named to the All-SEC tournament team. Following the season she was named to the SEC All-Defensive team.

== Professional career ==
=== WNBA ===
==== Los Angeles Sparks (2025–2026) ====
On April 14, 2025, Feagin was drafted in the second round, 21st overall, by the Los Angeles Sparks in the 2025 WNBA draft. During the 2025 WNBA season, she saw limited action during her rookie season, appearing in 16 games and averaging 4.8 minutes per game. During the 2026 WNBA season, she appeared in three games, before being waived by the Sparks on June 19, 2026.

==== Portland Fire (2026–present) ====
On June 24, 2026, Feagin signed a player development contract with the Portland Fire.

=== Overseas ===
On June 30, 2025, Feagin signed with the Adelaide Lightning of the Women's National Basketball League (WNBL) for the 2025–26 season.

== National team career ==
Feagin represented the United States at the 2021 FIBA Under-19 Women's Basketball World Cup, where she averaged 5.6 points and 5.0 rebounds and won a gold medal.

On September 3, 2024, she was named to team USA's roster for the 2024 FIBA 3x3 U23 World Cup. During the tournament she was the leading scorer with 44 points in seven games, and won a gold medal. She was subsequently named to the Team of the Tournament and tournament MVP.

== Personal life ==
Feagin was born to Charles and Sherri Feagin, and has two older sisters, Temeka Adderton and Kiera Wills, an older brother, Jacari Davison, and a younger brother, Jacob Feagin. Her father played college basketball at Morgan State, while her mother played college basketball at Washington.

== Career statistics ==
Legend
GP	Games played	GS	Games started	MPG	Minutes per game	RPG	Rebounds per game
APG	Assists per game	SPG	Steals per game	BPG	Blocks per game	PPG	Points per game
TO	Turnovers per game	FG%	Field-goal percentage	3P%	3-point field-goal percentage	FT%	Free-throw percentage
**Bold**	Career best	°	League leader

=== WNBA ===
==== Regular season ====
Stats current through end of 2025 season

WNBA regular season statistics
Year	Team	GP	GS	MPG	FG%	3P%	FT%	RPG	APG	SPG	BPG	TO	PPG
2025	Los Angeles	16	0	4.8	.357	.000	.000	0.7	0.3	0.0	0.4	0.4	1.3
**Career**	1 year, 1 team	16	0	4.8	.357	.000	.000	0.7	0.3	0.0	0.4	0.4	1.3

=== College ===
*	Denotes season(s) in which Feagin won an NCAA Championship

Year	Team	GP	GS	MPG	FG%	3P%	FT%	RPG	APG	SPG	BPG	TO	PPG
2021–22*	South Carolina	31	0	4.3	**61.8**	0.0	57.1	1.5	0.2	0.2	0.4	**0.6**	1.9
2022–23	South Carolina	27	0	7.9	60.0	0.0	73.3	2.4	0.3	0.1	0.7	0.8	4.9
2023–24*	South Carolina	**38**	3	15.2	55.0	14.3	68.3	3.8	1.0	0.4	0.6	1.1	6.7
2024–25	South Carolina	**38**	**38**	**19.8**	59.9	**33.3**	**79.7**	**4.6**	**1.3**	**0.8**	**1.5**	1.7	**8.1**
**Career**		134	41	12.5	58.3	28.6	71.4	3.2	0.8	0.4	0.8	1.1	5.6
Statistics retrieved from Sports-Reference.
