= Forest Park High School (Georgia) =

Public high school in Forest Park, Georgia, United States

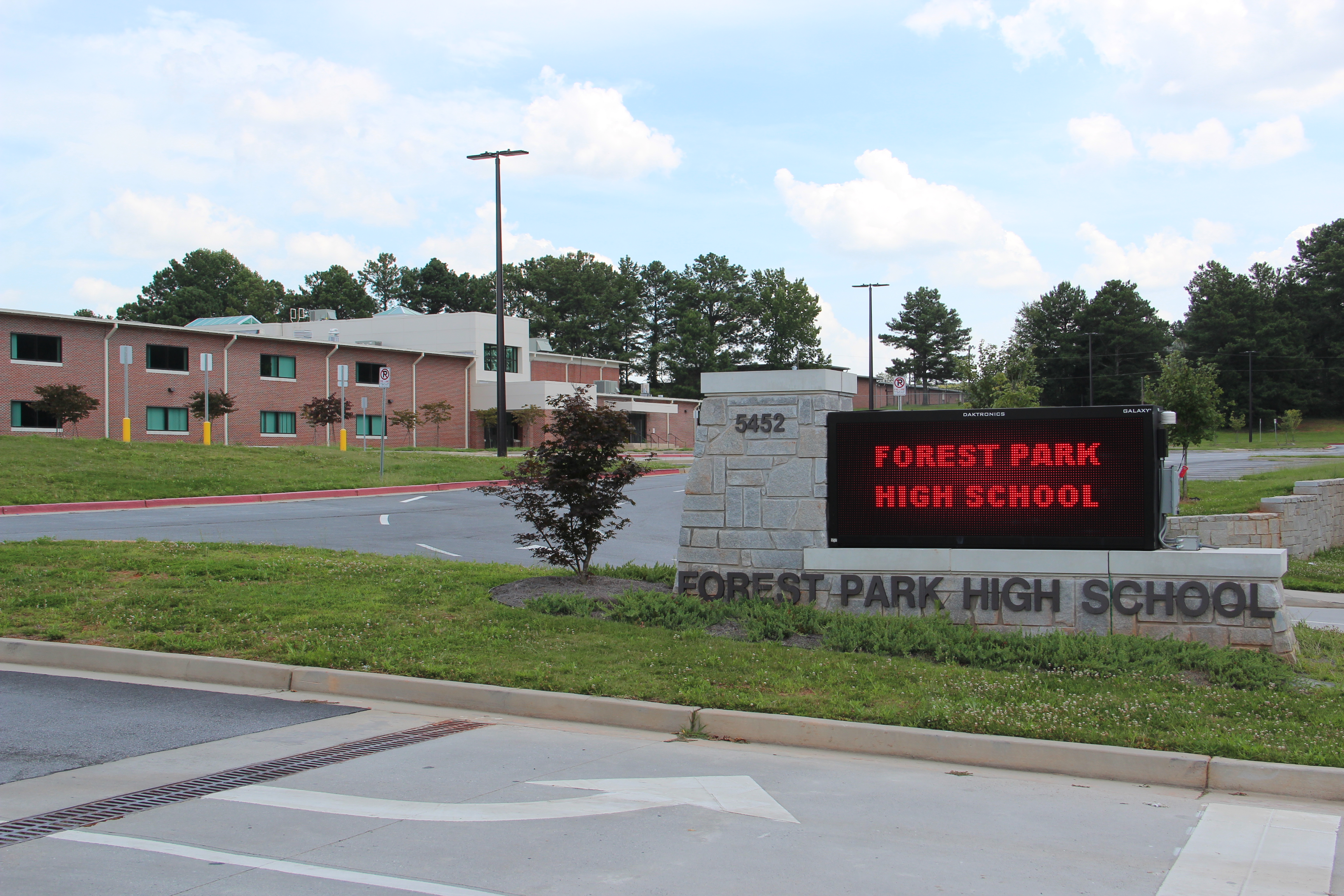

Location
- 5452 Phillips Dr; Forest Park, Georgia 30297; United States; 33.60555°N 84.35439°W

Information
- Type: Public secondary
- Established: 1928
- Principal: Dr. Kim A. Dancy
- Teaching staff: 96.00 (FTE)
- Grades: 9–12
- Enrollment: 1,684 (2023–2024)
- Student to teacher ratio: 17.54
- Campus: Suburban
- Colors: Wine, gold, and black
- Nickname: Panther
- Website: Forest Park

Forest Park High School is a four-year public high school located in Forest Park, Georgia, United States. It is part of Clayton County Public Schools. Middle schools generally associated with Forest Park High School are Forest Park Middle and Babb Middle.

Forest Park High School, one of Clayton County Public Schools oldest high schools, was established in 1928.

The school's attendance boundary includes: Conley, and western parts of Morrow.

== Notable alumni ==
- BruceDropEmOff, Content creator
- Philip M. Breedlove, Air Force general
- Justin Eboigbe (2019), defensive lineman for the Alabama Crimson Tide and Los Angeles Chargers.
- Sania Feagin, WNBA player
- Hines Ward, former Pittsburgh Steelers wide receiver, Super Bowl XL Most Valuable Player
- Bill Lee, former Georgia Representative
- Tanya Snyder, former co-owner and co-CEO of the Washington Commanders
- Charlton Warren, college football coach
