= Snyder Communications =

American marketing company

Snyder Communications Inc.
- Type: Public
- Traded as: NYSE: SNC
- Industry: Marketing
- Founded: 1988; 38 years ago
- Founders: Daniel Snyder; Michelle Snyder
- Defunct: 2000
- Fate: Merged (Euro RSCG, Campus, and Diversified Agencies)
- Owner: Havas
- Divisions: Arnold Communications; Brann Worldwide

Snyder Communications Inc. (SNC) was an American advertising corporation founded in 1988 by Daniel Snyder and his sister Michelle Snyder. Their activities were mainly outsourced marketing services, such as direct marketing, database marketing, proprietary product sampling, sponsored information display in prime locations, call centers, and field sales.

There was an initial public offering for SNC in September 1996 with a sale of 7.8 million shares at $17 a share. The IPO raised more than $130 million. Daniel Snyder became the youngest ever CEO of a New York Stock Exchange listed company at the age of 32.

Snyder Communications was acquired on April 4, 2000 by Havas, then Havas Advertising, in an all-share transaction worth in excess of US$2 billion.

== History ==
SNC grew aggressively through acquisitions. In 1995, Arnold Communications boss Ed Eskandarian sold out to Snyder. It acquired four other firms since the beginning of 1997, including Medical Marketing Detailing Inc., a New York-based provider of pharmaceutical marketing services; American List Corp. of Mineola, New York, which maintains a database of more than 30 million students that it rents to direct mail and telemarketing companies; Good Neighbor Direct, which provides marketing services for clients in 5,000 retail outlets; and Brann Holding Ltd., a British direct marketing company.

On an organic basis, SNC's revenue nearly doubled between 1995 and 1996 to $82.8 million. Medical Marketing Detailing itself had revenue of about $35 million in its fiscal year ended in October. American List's revenues in 1996 were about $19 million. The cost of those two acquisitions was just over $200 million. Prior to the IPO, Ventiv Health was hived off and distributed to the existing SNC shareholders. Circle.com, the online activities of SNC, was listed separately as a tracking stock.

Within two years after the IPO, Snyder had negotiated to acquire at least 14 companies In March 1997, SNC bought PromoTech Research Associates, a pharmaceutical marketing communications and direct marketing firm for an undisclosed sum. In December 1997, SNC agreed to buy Blau Marketing, a closely held direct marketing firm based in Wilton, Connecticut, for $72 million. It also bought two pharmaceutical contract sales organizations for a total of $58.5 million: Pharmflex for $34 million and Rapid Deployment Group Ltd. for $24.5 million. Pharmflex, of Malvern, Pennsylvania, and Rapid Deployment, of Winchester, England, provide sales services to pharmaceutical companies. In September 1998, acquired MKM Marketing of Munich, Germany for $58 million.

In January 2000, SNC launched Bounty SCA Worldwide, a division that organized the numerous marketing services businesses it had acquired over the previous few years.

=== Sale to Havas Advertising ===
At the end of 1999, SNC was put up for sale by Snyder who wanted to concentrate on running the Washington Redskins American football team, whom he had bought earlier that year. Later on April 4, 2000, at the height of the M&A frenzy, French multinational company Havas Advertising agreed to acquire Snyder in an all-share transaction in a deal worth in excess of US$2 billion. Just prior to the takeover, the market capitalization of SNC was just US$1.3 billion. SNC's three divisions – Bounty SCA Worldwide, Arnold Communications and Brann Worldwide – were respectively merged with Euro RSCG, Campus, and Diversified Agencies. Arnold Communications became Havas' second network, Arnold Worldwide Partners.
