= Tanya Snyder =

American businesswoman (born 1967)

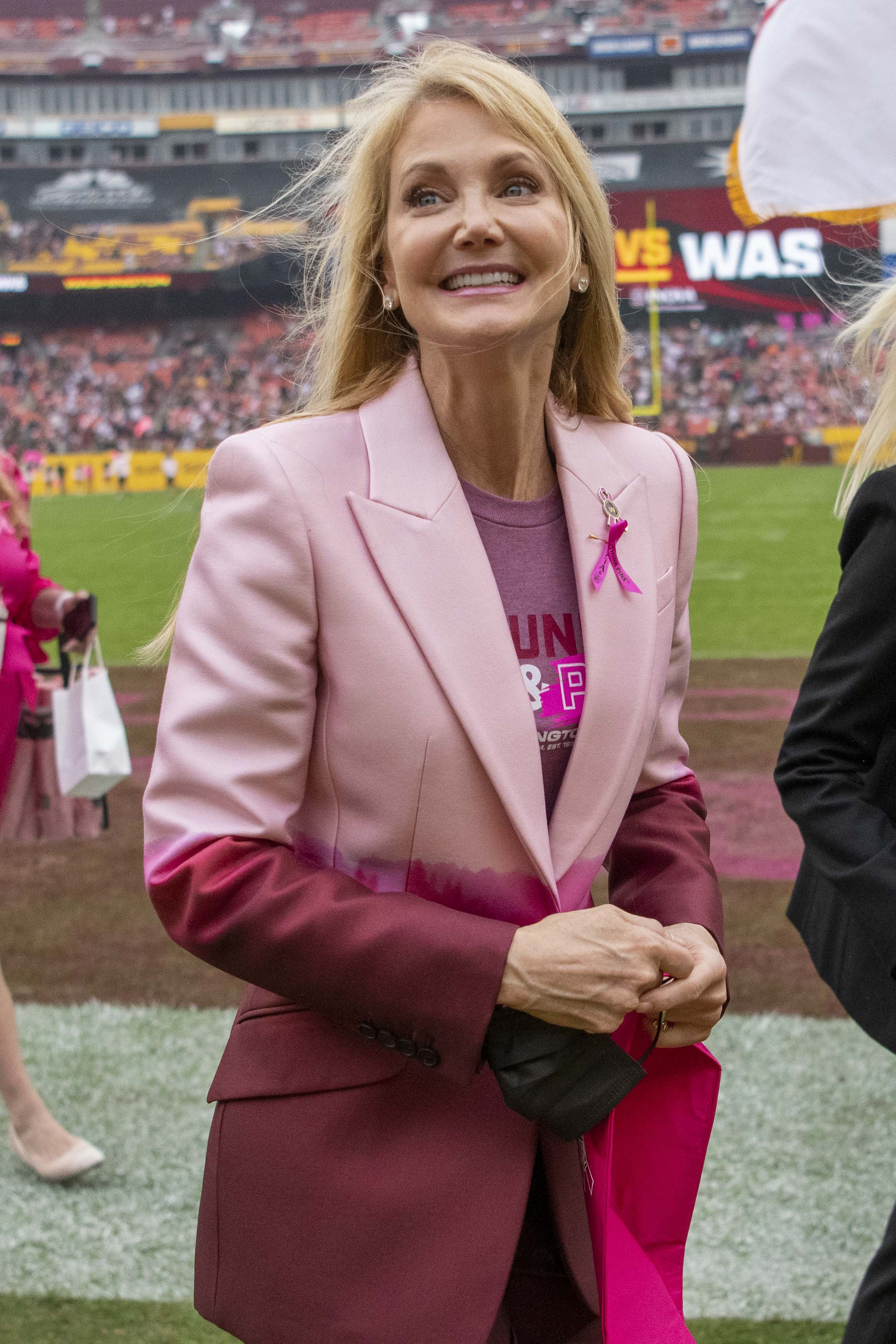
- Snyder in Landover, Maryland in 2021
- Born: 1967 (age 58–59); Atlanta, Georgia, U.S.
- Education: Forest Park High School
- Occupation: Businesswoman
- Known for: Former CEO of the Washington Commanders
- Spouse(s): Art Foreman (divorced); Daniel Snyder (m. 1994)
- Children: 3

Tanya Ivey Snyder (born 1967) is an American businesswoman. She and her husband, Daniel Snyder, owned the Washington Commanders of the National Football League (NFL) from 1999 to 2023. Snyder launched a charitable foundation in 1999, contributing more than $31 million to local community initiatives, and also helped establish the NFL's "Think Pink" breast cancer awareness campaign.

== Early life ==
Snyder grew up in the Forest Park, a suburb of Atlanta. She was the third of four daughters. Her father worked in the computer and tech businesses. Snyder was a cheerleader in junior high school and high school, graduating from Forest Park High School in 1985.

== Career ==
Snyder worked as a fashion model and as a clothing representative in Atlanta.

Snyder and her husband Daniel purchased the Washington Redskins in 1999, and she later launched the Washington Commanders Charitable Foundation. Since 2000, the foundation contribute more than $31 million to local community initiatives under her leadership.

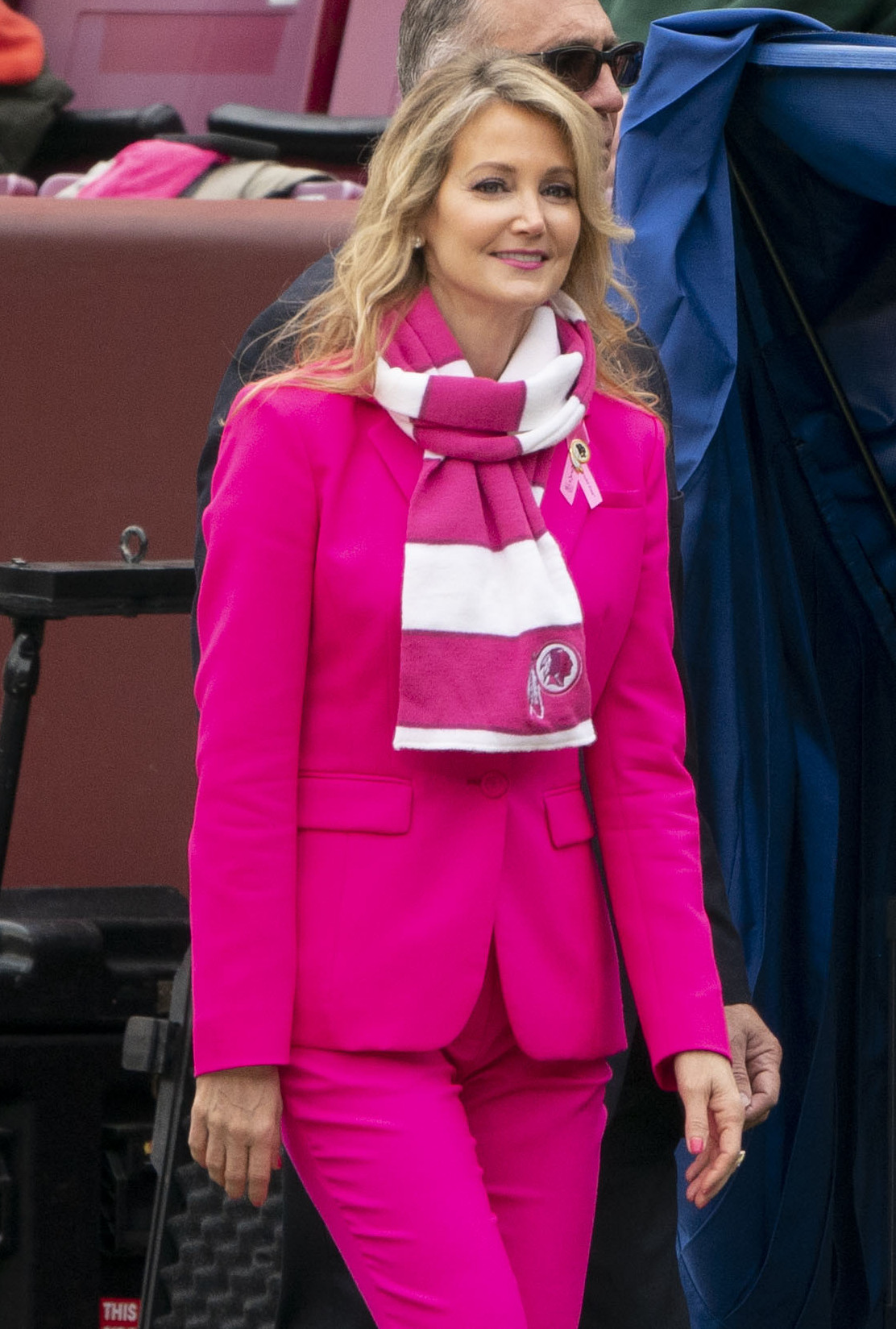
Snyder in 2018

Snyder partnered with Zeta Tau Alpha to co-find the THINK PINK campaign for breast cancer awareness within the National Football League in 1999. They passed out 8,000 handmade pink ribbons at FedExField to spread awareness, which led to the pink movement each October throughout the League. She was honored as Mother of the Year in 2013 by the American Cancer Society, the Gloria Heyison Award by Men Against Breast Cancer in 2012, and the Zeta Tau Alpha Foundation's ZTA THINK-PINK! Ambassador Award in 2008.

In May 2014, Snyder and her husband received the Charles B. Wang International Children's Award from the National Center for Missing & Exploited Children.

In 2021, Snyder was named as co-CEO of the team, leading the transition from the old name, Washington Redskins, to a cultural and business transformation as the Washington Commanders. In October 2022, she was criticized for saying "Hail to the Redskins" after the team had already changed its name. In July 2023, the Commanders were sold to a group led by Josh Harris for $6.05 billion, the largest sales transaction for a sports franchise in history.

== Personal life ==
At age 20, Snyder married Art Foreman, a jewelry sales representative and current VP of sales of JBS USA. They divorced two years later. She met American businessman Daniel Snyder on a blind date in 1993, and they married in April 1994. The Snyders have three children and reside in Alexandria, Virginia. She was diagnosed with breast cancer in 2008. Snyder is a Republican and has donated to campaigns for Donald Trump and George Allen, whose father, George H. Allen, coached the Redskins from 1971 to 1977.

In 2023, Snyder and her husband donated their $49 million home to the American Cancer Society to be sold for cancer research. The house sold at auction in December 2025 for $13.3 million.
