= Japan men's national under-23 3x3 team =

National 3x3 basketball team

Japan
- FIBA zone: FIBA Asia
- Coach: Torsten Loibl

World Championships
- Appearances: 1
- Medals: none
Home	Away

The Japan men's national under-23 3x3 team is the national basketball team of Japan and is governed by the Japan Basketball Association.

It represents the country in international under-23 (under age 23) men's basketball competitions.

== 3x3 Under-23 World Cup ==
Year	Position	Pld	W	L	Players
(China) 2018 Xi'an	15th	4	1	3	Sugimoto, Kawashima, Nozaki, Saito
Total	-	4	1	3	

== See also ==
- Japan men's national 3x3 team
- Japan men's national basketball team
- Japan men's national under-17 basketball team
- Japan men's national under-19 basketball team
