= Torsten Loibl =

German professional basketball couch

- Loibl in 2016

Japan national 3x3 team
- Position: Head coach

Personal information
- Born: May 1, 1972 (age 54) Karl-Marx-Stadt, Germany

Career history

Coaching
- 1988-1999: BSG Lok Karl-Marx-Stadt junior team
- 1995-2000: Saxony
- 2000-2002: Saitama Prefecture
- 2002-2006: BV Chemnitz 99
- 2006-2008: Toyota Alvark
- 2008: BV Chemnitz 99
- 2010-2011: BV Chemnitz 99
- 2011-2012: Levanga Hokkaido
- 2015-2018: Japan U19
- 2018-present: Japan men's 3x3 and Japan women's 3x3

Career highlights
- ProA Coach of the Year (2010-11); FIBA 3x3 Under-23 World Cup Champion (2019)
Medals
Basketball coaching
Representing Japan
FIBA Asia Under-18 Championship
Silver medal – second place	2016 Tehran	Japan U18
Asian Games
Silver medal – second place	2018 Jakarta (3x3)	Japan 3x3
FIBA 3x3 Under-23 World Cup
Silver medal – second place	2018 Xi'an	Japan 3x3
Gold medal – first place	2019 Lanzhou	Japan 3x3
FIBA 3x3 Women's Series
Silver medal – second place	2019 Chengdu	Japan 3x3
Gold medal – first place	2019 Xiong An	Japan 3x3
Bronze medal – third place	2019 Tokyo	Japan 3x3
Silver medal – second place	2019 Montreal	Japan 3x3

Torsten Loibl (born May 1, 1972) is a German basketball coach. He won the 2019 3x3 U23 World Championship as head coach of the Japanese women's national team, the country's first-ever world title in basketball.

== Career ==
Torsten Loibl's sports career began at the age of 16 as a youth coach at BSG Lok Karl-Marx-Stadt. He has been an honorary member of this club (today ESV Lok Chemnitz) since 2012. In 2000, Loibl moved to Japan as the prefecture Saitama's state coach and stayed until 2002. He then took over the second-division team BV Chemnitz 99 as head coach from 2002,[1] led them into the top tier of the 2nd Bundesliga, and ended the 2005/06 season in third place, which was the best result in the club's history until then.[2] In 2004, Loibl was also assistant coach of the German U16 national team and participated in the Albert Schweitzer Tournament in that role.[3]

Afterwards, Loibl received an offer from the Japanese first-division team Toyota Alvark, which he reportedly 'could not refuse.'[2] He was head coach of Toyota Alvark until 2008 and later served as head coach of Levanga Hokkaido from 2011 to 2012 in the same country. In the 2008/09 season (until the end of December 2008) as well as in the 2010/11 season, he was once again the coach of the Chemnitz second-division team.

Loibl founded the Euro Basketball Academy, through which he is involved in youth basketball work and conducts coach training sessions. As a member of the Association for Integration through Sport, Loibl was committed to helping victims of the tsunami disaster on March 11, 2011. Immediately after the natural disaster, he traveled to the earthquake-affected regions and organized basketball camps for affected children and teenagers.

Loibl gave several lectures at coach training events during major tournaments, such as at the U19 World Championship in Prague in 2013, the U17 World Championship in Dubai in 2014, the Women's European Championship in Prague in 2017, and the U19 World Championship in Cairo in 2017, where he simultaneously served as head coach of the Japanese national team. For the Japanese Basketball Association, he worked as a junior national coach and among other things supervised the selection at the U19 World Championship 2017,[6] the U16 at the 2018 Asian Championship[7] as well as the country's U18 team at the Albert Schweitzer Tournament 2018.[8] From 2018 to 2021, Loibl was head coach for 3x3 basketball at the Japanese federation. On October 6, 2019, Loibl's team became U23 world champion in 3x3. At the 2020 Summer Olympics in Tokyo, held in 2021, he coached the Japanese 3x3 teams (men and women). Under Loibl's guidance, both reached the quarterfinals,[9] with the women finishing fifth and the men sixth.

In October 2021, Loibl was honored by the city of Chemnitz for his sporting achievements and entered the city's Golden Book.[10] In May 2022, Loibl took over responsibilities for the U16, U18, and U20 age groups at the Czech Basketball Federation, and as head coach, he led the men's U18 national team. He was also assigned the role of director of elite sports with responsibilities in player development as well as structural association work.[11] Since August 2025, Loibl has been working again as head coach at Levanga Hokkaido in Japan's top professional league (B-League).[12] In August 2023, the world federation FIBA appointed the Chemnitz native to the executive committee of the World Association of Basketball Coaches (WABC) for the period from 2023 to 2027
