= Stephanie Mawuli =

Japanese basketball player (born 1998)

Stephanie Mawuli 馬瓜ステファニー
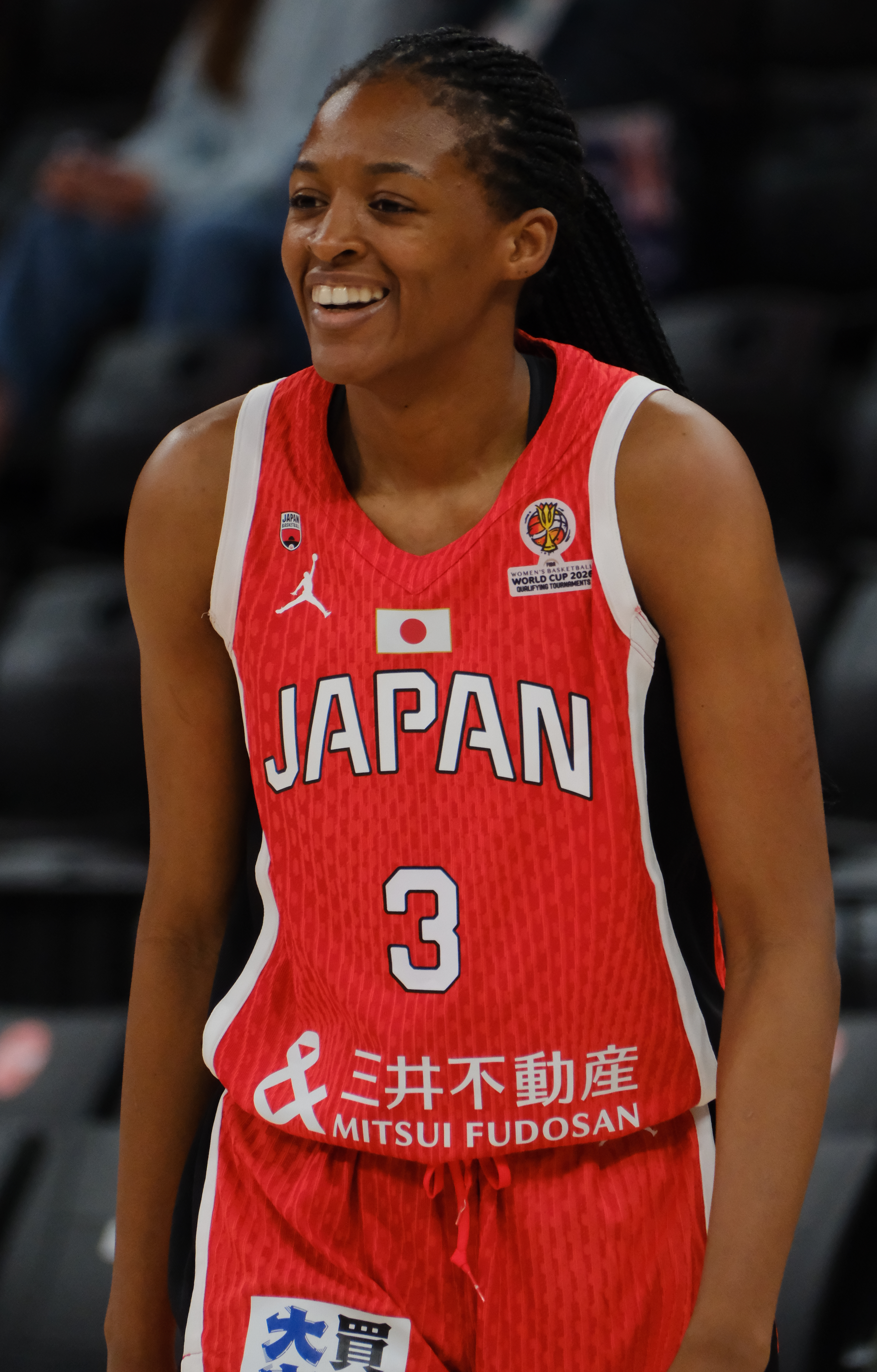
- Mawuli in 2026

No. 33 – Casademont Zaragoza
- Position: C/F
- League: Liga Femenina de Baloncesto, FIBA 3X3

Personal information
- Born: November 25, 1998 (age 27) Toyohashi, Aichi
- Listed height: 5 ft 11 in (1.80 m)
- Listed weight: 172 lb (78 kg)

Career information
- High school: Oka Gakuen (Shōwa-ku, Nagoya)
- Playing career: 2017–present

Career history
- 2017–2024: Toyota Antelopes
- 2024–present: Basket Zaragoza

Career highlights
- Japanese High School Champion (2016)
- Stats at Basketball Reference
Medals
Women's basketball
Representing Japan
FIBA Asia Cup
Gold medal – first place	2021 Jordan
Silver medal – second place	2023 Australia
Silver medal – second place	2025 China
Asian Games
Bronze medal – third place	2018 Jakarta	Team
Asia U-18 Championship
Silver medal – second place	2016 Bangkok	Team
Asia U-16 Championship
Silver medal – second place	2013 Colombo	Team
Women's 3x3 basketball
Asian Games
Representing Japan
Silver medal – second place	2018 Jakarta (3x3)	3x3
FIBA 3x3 Under-23 World Cup
Gold medal – first place	2019 Lanzhou	Team
Silver medal – second place	2018 Xi'an	Team

Stephanie Mawuli (馬瓜ステファニー, Mauri Sutefani; born November 25, 1998) is a Japanese basketball player for Casademont Zaragoza of the Liga Femenina de Baloncesto, in Spain.

Previously, she played for the Toyota Antelopes of the Women's Japan Basketball League. She also plays for the Japan women's national 3x3 team. The younger Mawuli led the national U23 3x3 team to the World championship in 2019. She became the first-ever player to win both 5x5 and 3x3 medals at Asian Games in 2018. In 2023, Mawuli signed a contract to play on the training camp roster of the New York Liberty. On 11 May 2024, Mawuli was waived by the New York Liberty.

On May 22, 2024 she signed for Casademont Zaragoza for the 2024-2025 season.

== Personal ==
She played with her sister Evelyn for the Toyota Antelopes. Her parents were both born in Ghana and emigrated to Japan. Stephanie was born in Toyohashi, Aichi. She naturalized along with her entire family to become a Japanese citizen, in order to represent Japan in international tournaments.

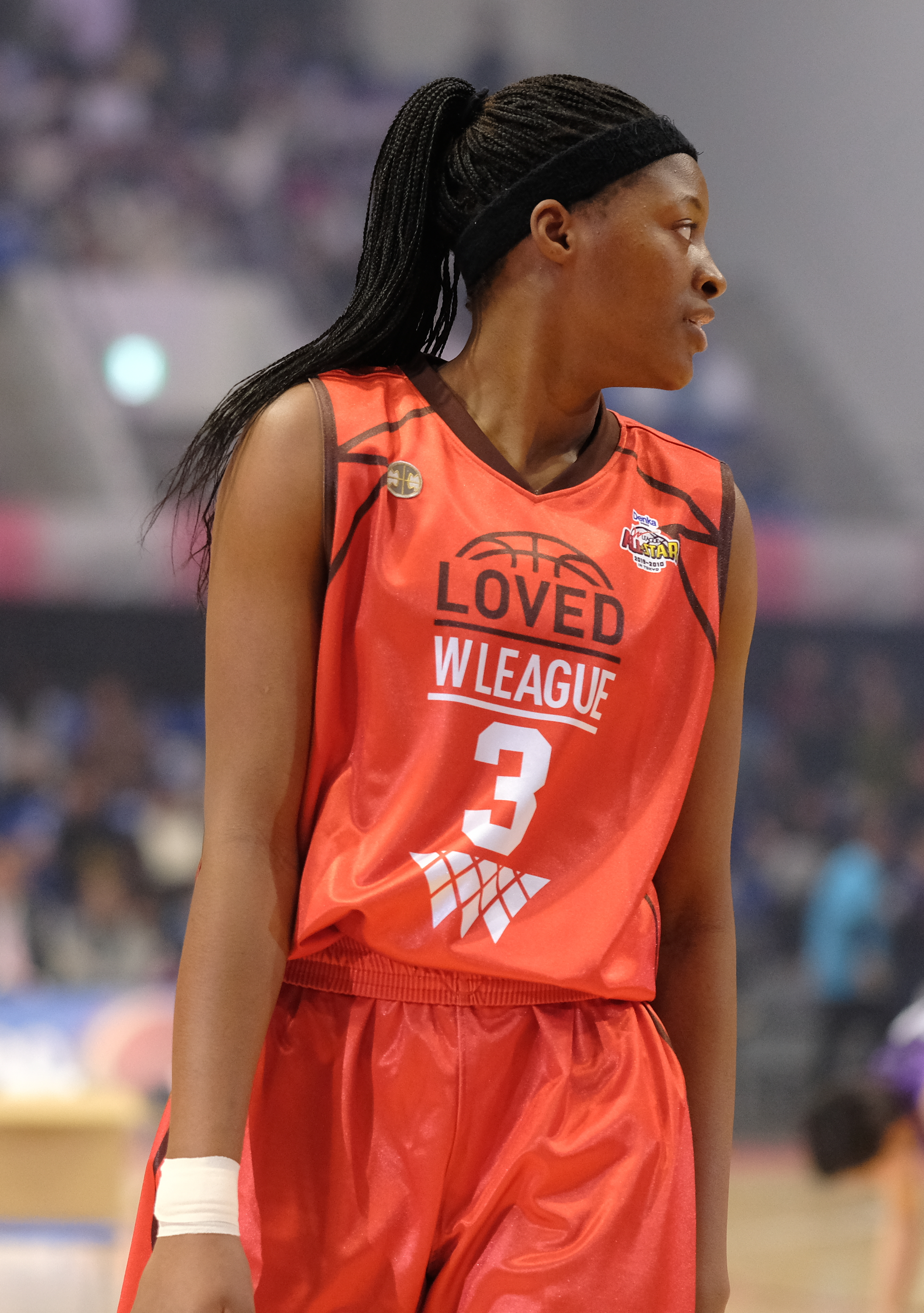
WJBL All-star
