= 2018 FIBA 3x3 U23 World Cup – Men's tournament =

Tournament details
- Host country: China
- City: Xi'an
- Dates: 3–7 October
- Teams: 20

Final positions
- Champions: Russia (1st title)
- Runners-up: Latvia
- Third place: Hungary
- Fourth place: France

Tournament statistics
- MVP: (Russia) Alexander Zuev

The 2018 FIBA 3x3 U23 World Cup – Men's tournament is the inaugural edition of this championship. The event was held in Xi'an, China. It was contested by 20 teams.

Russia won their first title with a win against Latvia in the final.

== Host selection ==
Chinese city, Xi'an, was given the hosting rights on 17 July 2018.

== Teams ==
FIBA announced the qualified teams on 26 September 2018.

Africa

- Egypt

Americas

- None

Asia and Oceania

- China (hosts)
- Chinese Taipei
- Indonesia
- Japan
- Kyrgyzstan
- Mongolia
- Philippines
- Turkmenistan

Europe

- Czech Republic
- Estonia
- France
- Hungary
- Latvia
- Netherlands
- Romania
- Russia
- Serbia
- Slovenia
- Ukraine

== Seeding ==
The pools were announced on 26 September 2018. The seeding and groups were as follows:

Pool A	Pool B	Pool C	Pool D
Latvia (1); Mongolia (8); Estonia (9); Indonesia (16); Hungary (17)	Russia (2); Netherlands (7); France (10); Kyrgyzstan (15); Egypt (18)	China (3) (H); Slovenia (6); Serbia (11); Turkmenistan (14); Philippines (19)	Romania (4); Ukraine (5); Czech Republic (12); Japan (13); Chinese Taipei (20)

== Preliminary round ==
=== Pool A ===
Pos	Team	Pld	W	L	PF	PA	PD	Qualification	(Latvia)	(Hungary)	(Estonia)	(Mongolia)	(Indonesia)
1	Latvia	4	4	0	85	53	+32	Quarterfinals				21–14	22–7
2	Hungary	4	3	1	77	63	+14	Quarterfinals	19–20		21–18		
3	Estonia	4	1	3	67	73	−6		10–12				22–8
4	Mongolia	4	1	3	65	71	−6			12–15	22–14		
5	Indonesia	4	1	3	49	83	−34			13–22		21–17	

Source: FIBA
Rules for classification: 1) Wins; 2) Head-to-head record; 3) Points scored.

=== Pool B ===
Pos	Team	Pld	W	L	PF	PA	PD	Qualification	(Russia)	(France)	(Netherlands)	(Egypt)	(Kyrgyzstan)
1	Russia	4	4	0	86	60	+26	Quarterfinals			22–13		22–13
2	France	4	3	1	77	49	+28	Quarterfinals	17–21				22–4
3	Netherlands	4	2	2	71	57	+14			14–16 OT		22–13	
4	Egypt	4	1	3	61	76	−15		17–21	10–22			
5	Kyrgyzstan	4	0	4	34	87	−53				6–22	11–21	

Source: FIBA
Rules for classification: 1) Wins; 2) Head-to-head record; 3) Points scored.

=== Pool C ===
Pos	Team	Pld	W	L	PF	PA	PD	Qualification	(China)	(Slovenia)	(Philippines)	(Turkmenistan)	(Serbia)
1	China (H)	4	3 (Note: China 21–17 Slovenia)	1	79	57	+22	Quarterfinals		21–17		22–6	
2	Slovenia	4	3	1	80	57	+23	Quarterfinals			21–14		21–12
3	Philippines	4	2	2	72	65	+7		21–15				16–21
4	Turkmenistan	4	1 (Note: Turkmenistan 21–19 Serbia)	3	45	83	−38			10–21	8–21		
5	Serbia	4	1	3	65	79	−14		13–21			19–21	

Source: FIBA
Rules for classification: 1) Wins; 2) Head-to-head record; 3) Points scored.
(H) Hosts

=== Pool D ===
Pos	Team	Pld	W	L	PF	PA	PD	Qualification	(Ukraine)	(Chinese Taipei)	(Romania)	(Japan)	(Czech Republic)
1	Ukraine	4	4	0	85	62	+23	Quarterfinals		20–14			22–15
2	Chinese Taipei	4	3	1	73	58	+15	Quarterfinals			20–17		22–8
3	Romania	4	1	3	68	83	−15		15–22			15–21	
4	Japan	4	1	3	62	69	−7		18–21	13–17			
5	Czech Republic	4	1	3	59	75	−16				20–21	16–10	

Source: FIBA
Rules for classification: 1) Wins; 2) Head-to-head record; 3) Points scored.

== Knockout stage ==
All times are local.

Quarter-finals
7 October – 13:00
Latvia	21
Slovenia	10
7 October – 13:25
Ukraine	17
France	19 OT
7 October – 15:05
Russia	21
Chinese Taipei	13
7 October – 15:30
China	15
Hungary	18

Semi-finals
7 October – 17:00
Latvia	21
France	14
7 October – 17:30
Russia	21
Hungary	10

Final
7 October – 21:05
Latvia	18
Russia	21
Bronze medal
7 October – 19:15
France	14
Hungary	15

== Final standings ==
=== Tiebreakers ===
- 1) Wins
- 2) Points scored
- 3) Seeding

Pos	Team	Pld	W	L	PF	PA	PD
1	Russia	7	7	0	149	101	+48
2	Latvia	7	6	1	145	98	+47
3	Hungary	7	5	2	120	113	+7
4	France	7	4	3	124	102	+22
5	Ukraine	5	4	1	102	81	+21
6	China	5	3	2	94	75	+19
7	Slovenia	5	3	2	90	78	+12
8	Chinese Taipei	5	3	2	82	79	+3
9	Philippines	4	2	2	72	65	+7
10	Netherlands	4	2	2	71	57	+14
11	Romania	4	1	3	68	83	–15
12	Estonia	4	1	3	67	73	–6
13	Mongolia	4	1	3	65	71	–6
14	Serbia	4	1	3	65	79	–14
15	Japan	4	1	3	62	69	–7
16	Egypt	4	1	3	61	76	–15
17	Czech Republic	4	1	3	59	75	–16
18	Indonesia	4	1	3	49	83	–34
19	Turkmenistan	4	1	3	45	83	–38
20	Kyrgyzstan	4	0	4	38	83	–53

== Awards ==
These players were given the awards after the competition:

=== Most valuable player ===
- (Russia) Alexander Zuev

=== Top scorer ===
- (Russia) Alexander Zuev (52 points)

=== Team of the tournament ===
- (Russia) Alexander Zuev
- (Latvia) Armands Ginters
- (Hungary) Attila Demeter

== See also ==
- 2018 FIBA 3x3 World Cup – Men's tournament
- 2018 FIBA 3x3 World Cup – Women's tournament
- 2018 FIBA 3x3 U23 World Cup – Women's tournament
- 2018 FIBA 3x3 Asia Cup
- 2018 FIBA 3x3 Europe Cup
