= FIBA 3x3 U23 World Cup =

International youth basketball tournament

- Current season, competition or edition: 2026 FIBA 3x3 U23 World Cup
- Sport: 3x3 basketball
- Founded: 2018
- Founder: FIBA
- First season: 2018
- No. of teams: 20
- Continent: FIBA (International)
- Most recent champions: Men: Lithuania (2nd title); Women: United States (2nd title)
- Most titles: Men: Russia; Lithuania (2 titles each); Women: United States; Netherlands (2 titles each)
- Related competitions: FIBA 3x3 World Cup

The FIBA 3x3 U23 World Cup is a 3x3 youth international tournament sanctioned by the International Basketball Federation (FIBA) since 2018 for basketball players up to 23 years old. The first edition was held in Xi'an, China in 2018. FIBA decided to launch the tournament after the hosting of the first edition of the FIBA 3x3 U23 Nations League in 2017 which was deemed a success by the international basketball body.

== Results ==
=== Men ===
#	Year	Host	Final			Third place match		
#	Year	Host	Champion	Score	Second place	Third place	Score	Fourth place
1	2018; Details	(China); Xi'an	Russia	21–18	Latvia	Hungary	15–14	France
2	2019; Details	(China); Lanzhou	Russia	21–11	Ukraine	Serbia	21–13	Netherlands
-	2020	(China); Lanzhou	Cancelled due to the COVID-19 pandemic			Cancelled due to the COVID-19 pandemic		
3	2022; Details	(Romania); Bucharest	Poland	21–20	Serbia	France	21–17	Lithuania
4	2023; Details	(Poland); Lublin	United States	21–3	Israel	Germany	22–14	France
5	2024; Details	(Mongolia); Ulaanbaatar	Germany	21–13	United States	Spain	21–16	Lithuania
6	2025; Details	(China); Xiong'an	Lithuania	19–14	Serbia	Czech Republic	17–15	Croatia
7	2026; Details	(China); Wuhan	Lithuania	19–18	Latvia	Australia	22–20	Serbia

=== Women ===
#	Year	Host	Final			Third place match		
#	Year	Host	Champion	Score	Second place	Third place	Score	Fourth place
1	2018; Details	(China); Xi'an	Russia	21–12	Japan	Ukraine	18–14	Germany
2	2019; Details	(China); Lanzhou	Japan	19–14	Russia	France	20–14	Belarus
-	2020	(China); Lanzhou	Cancelled due to the COVID-19 pandemic			Cancelled due to the COVID-19 pandemic		
3	2022; Details	(Romania); Bucharest	France	21–18	United States	Netherlands	21–18	China
4	2023; Details	(Poland); Lublin	Netherlands	19–17	Poland	Lithuania	19–12	China
5	2024; Details	(Mongolia); Ulaanbaatar	United States	18–15	Netherlands	China	20–14	Germany
6	2025; Details	(China); Xiong'an	Netherlands	17–13	France	Spain	18–12	Japan
7	2026; Details	(China); Wuhan	United States	15–10	Canada	Spain	22–14	Latvia

== Medal table ==
Rank	Nation	Gold	Silver	Bronze	Total
1	United States	3	2	0	5
2	Russia	3	1	0	4
3	Netherlands	2	1	1	4
4	Lithuania	2	0	1	3
5	France	1	1	2	4
6	Japan	1	1	0	2
6	Poland	1	1	0	2
8	Germany	1	0	1	2
9	Serbia	0	2	1	3
10	Latvia	0	2	0	2
11	Ukraine	0	1	1	2
12	Canada	0	1	0	1
12	Israel	0	1	0	1
14	Spain	0	0	3	3
15	Australia	0	0	1	1
15	China	0	0	1	1
15	Czech Republic	0	0	1	1
15	Hungary	0	0	1	1
Totals (18 entries)		14	14	14	42

== Participating teams ==
=== Men's teams ===
Nation	(China) 2018	(China) 2019	(Romania) 2022	(Poland) 2023	(Mongolia) 2024	(China) 2025	(China) 2026
Algeria	–	–	–	–	11th	14th	16th
Argentina	–	7th	–	–	10th	6th	11th
Australia	–	–	–	–	–	–	3rd
Austria	–	–	–	10th	–	–	–
Benin	–	–	–	17th	19th	–	–
Brazil	–	9th	14th	–	–	–	–
Chile	–	–	17th	7th	20th	–	–
China	6th	5th	7th	18th	6th	8th	14th
Chinese Taipei	8th	–	20th	–	–	–	–
Croatia	–	-	–	-	-	4th	–
Czech Republic	17th	–	–	5th	–	3rd	–
Egypt	16th	–	10th	14th	17th	17th	15th
Estonia	12th	–	–	–	–	–	–
Fiji	–	–	–	–	–	20th	–
France	4th	–	3rd	4th	8th	16th	5th
Germany	–	–	8th	3rd	1st	12th	10th
Hungary	3rd	–	–	–	–	–	–
Indonesia	18th	–	–	–	–	–	–
Israel	–	–	11th	2nd	15th	–	–
Italy	–	6th	–	9th	18th	7th	–
Iran	–	-	–	-	-	18th	–
Japan	15th	–	6th	19th	5th	–	–
Kazakhstan	–	16th	18th	–	–	–	17th
Kenya	–	–	–	16th	16th	–	19th
Kyrgyzstan	20th	20th	–	–	–	–	–
Latvia	2nd	8th	5th	–	12th	5th	2nd
Lithuania	–	15th	4th	6th	4th	1st	1st
Mongolia	13th	10th	9th	11th	13th	9th	–
Netherlands	10th	4th	15th	12th	9th	–	7th
New Zealand	–	11th	–	–	7th	10th	6th
Philippines	9th	–	–	–	–	–	18th
Poland	–	–	1st	15th	–	13th	9th
Qatar	–	14th	16th	13th	–	15th	–
Romania	11th	12th	13th	8th	–	–	–
Russia	1st	1st	DQ	–	–	–	–
Serbia	14th	3rd	2nd	–	–	2nd	4th
Slovakia	–	–	19th	–	–	–	–
Slovenia	7th	13th	–	–	–	–	–
South Korea	–	18th	–	–	–	–	13th
Spain	–	–	–	–	3rd	–	12th
Tonga	–	–	–	–	–	–	20th
Tunisia	–	–	–	20th	–	–	–
Turkey	–	19th	–	–	–	–	–
Turkmenistan	19th	–	–	–	–	–	–
Ukraine	5th	2nd	12th	–	14th	–	–
United States	–	17th	–	1st	2nd	11th	8th
Venezuela	–	–	–	–	–	19th	–

=== Women's teams ===
Nation	(China) 2018	(China) 2019	(Romania) 2022	(Poland) 2023	(Mongolia) 2024	(China) 2025	(China) 2026
Andorra	11th	–	–	–	–	–	–
Algeria	-	–	–	–	–	19th	–
Argentina	6th	–	–	–	–	–	–
Australia	–	–	–	–	–	–	5th
Austria	–	–	14th	14th	16th	–	–
Belarus	5th	4th	–	–	–	–	–
Benin	–	–	–	–	18th	–	–
Canada	–	–	–	–	–	–	2nd
Chile	–	–	15th	12th	14th	11th	–
China	12th	7th	4th	4th	3rd	5th	7th
Chinese Taipei	–	–	13th	–	–	17th	17th
Czech Republic	15th	11th	–	8th	–	6th	10th
Dominican Republic	–	15th	16th	–	–	–	–
Egypt	–	–	17th	13th	12th	15th	9th
Fiji	–	–	–	–	-	20th	–
France	10th	3rd	1st	6th	8th	2nd	6th
Germany	4th	8th	9th	9th	4th	10th	–
Greece	–	–	–	18th	–	–	–
Hungary	8th	12th	7th	7th	6th	–	–
Indonesia	16th	18th	–	–	–	–	–
Iran	7th	16th	–	–	–	–	–
Israel	–	–	18th	–	10th	–	–
Italy	–	13th	–	10th	11th	9th	13th
Japan	2nd	1st	5th	5th	9th	4th	12th
Kazakhstan	19th	–	–	–	–	–	–
Kenya	–	–	–	16th	20th	–	14th
Latvia	–	–	–	–	–	–	4th
Lithuania	–	–	12th	3rd	–	–	–
Madagascar	–	–	–	–	–	–	18th
Malaysia	14th	–	–	–	–	–	–
Mexico	–	–	–	–	-	18th	–
Mongolia	18th	6th	10th	15th	15th	–	–
Netherlands	9th	5th	3rd	1st	2nd	1st	8th
New Zealand	–	–	–	–	17th	12th	–
Poland	–	–	6th	2nd	5th	8th	16th
Philippines	–	–	–	–	–	13th	19th
Romania	17th	10th	11th	19th	–	–	–
Russia	1st	2nd	DQ	–	–	–	–
Slovenia	–	–	–	–	–	–	15th
Spain	–	–	–	–	7th	3rd	3rd
Sri Lanka	20th	19th	20th	–	–	–	–
Switzerland	–	14th	–	–	–	–	–
Thailand	–	–	–	20th	–	–	–
Tonga	–	–	–	–	–	–	20th
Tunisia	–	–	–	17th	–	–	–
Turkmenistan	–	20th	–	–	–	–	–
Uganda	13th	17th	–	–	19th	14th	11th
Ukraine	3rd	9th	8th	–	13th	–	–
United States	–	–	2nd	11th	1st	7th	1st
Uzbekistan	–	–	19th	–	–	–	–
Venezuela	–	–	–	–	–	16th	–

== See also ==
- FIBA 3x3 World Cup
- FIBA 3x3 U18 World Cup
