= Mai Yamamoto =

Japanese basketball player

Mai Yamamoto 山本麻衣
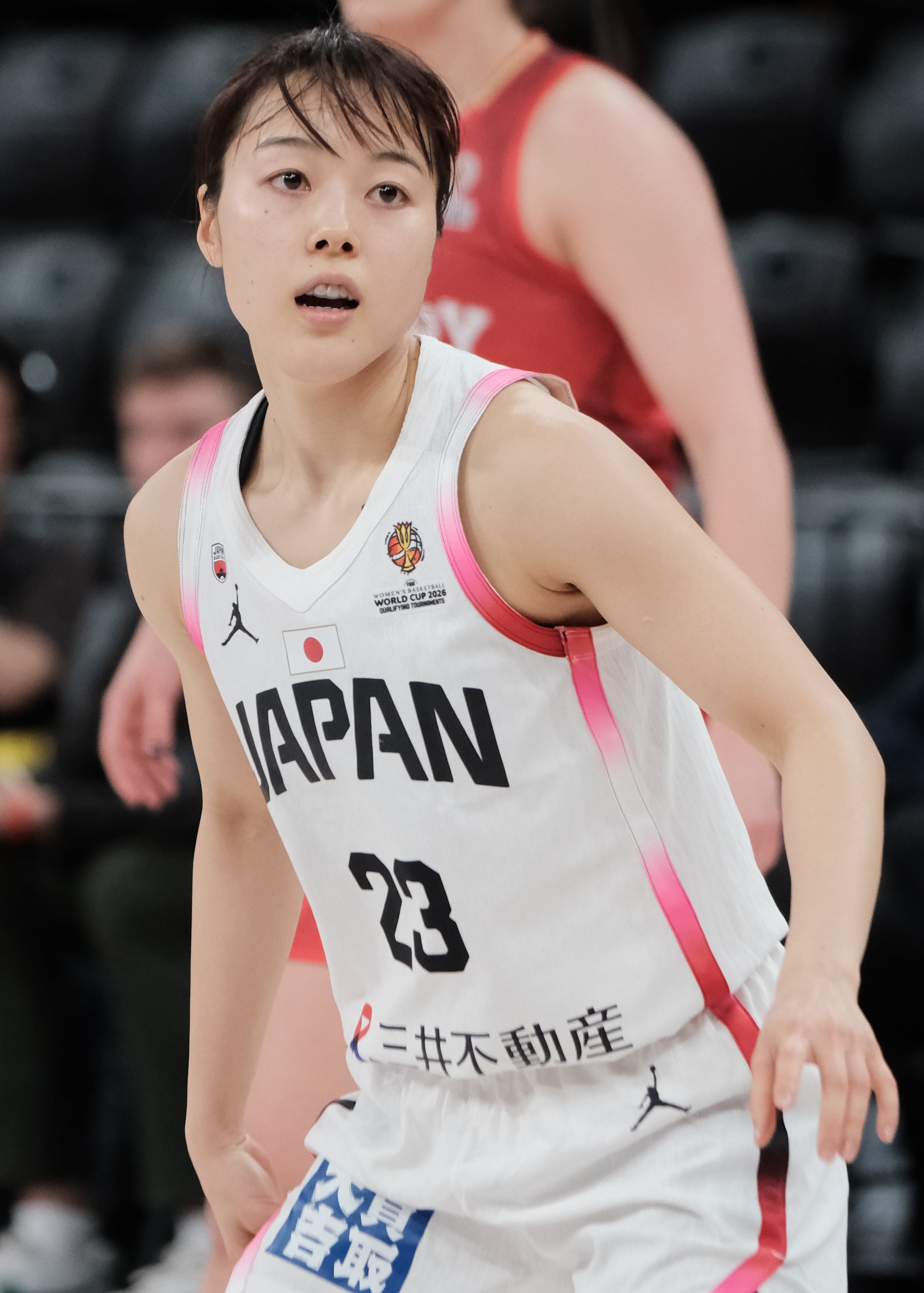

No. 18 – Las Vegas Aces
- Position: Guard
- League: Women's Japan Basketball League, FIBA 3X3

Personal information
- Born: October 23, 1999 (age 27) Hiroshima
- Listed height: 5 ft 5 in (1.65 m)
- Listed weight: 128 lb (58 kg)

Career information
- High school: Oka Gakuen (Shōwa-ku, Nagoya)
- Playing career: 2017–present

Career history
- 2017-present: Toyota Antelopes
- 2026-Present: Las Vegas Aces

Career highlights
- Stats at Basketball Reference
Medals
Women's basketball
Representing Japan
FIBA Asia Cup
Gold medal – first place	2021 Jordan
Silver medal – second place	2023 Australia
Asia U-18 Championship
Silver medal – second place	2016 Bangkok	Team
Women's 3x3 basketball
Representing Japan
FIBA 3x3 Under-23 World Cup
Gold medal – first place	2019 Lanzhou	Team
Silver medal – second place	2018 Xi'an	Team

Mai Yamamoto (山本麻衣, Yamamoto Mai; born October 23, 1999) is a Japanese professional basketball player who plays for the Las Vegas Aces in the WNBA and the Toyota Antelopes of the Women's Japan Basketball League.

Yamamoto won a gold medal with the U23 national team at the FIBA 3x3 Under-23 World Cup in Lanzhou, and was named the tournament MVP and shoot-out contest gold medalist. It was Japan's first world title in basketball. At the Olympics, Yamamoto played both on the Japanese 3x3 team at the 2020 Tokyo Olympics and on the 5x5 basketball team at the 2024 Paris Olympics.

== Professional career ==
On February 5, 2025, Yamamoto signed a contract with the Dallas Wings of the WNBA in the United States. On July 17, 2026, she signed a rest-of-season contract with the Las Vegas Aces.

== Personal life ==
Yamamoto has two dogs named Minto and Rachel.

== Career statistics ==
Legend
GP	Games played	GS	Games started	MPG	Minutes per game	RPG	Rebounds per game
APG	Assists per game	SPG	Steals per game	BPG	Blocks per game	PPG	Points per game
TO	Turnovers per game	FG%	Field-goal percentage	3P%	3-point field-goal percentage	FT%	Free-throw percentage
**Bold**	Career best	°	League leader

=== WNBA ===
==== Regular season ====
WNBA regular season statistics
Year	Team	GP	GS	MPG	FG%	3P%	FT%	RPG	APG	SPG	BPG	TO	PPG
2026	Las Vegas	14	0	15.1	.371	.381	1.000	1.1	1.4	.8	.0	.5	5.1
**Career**	1 year, 1 team	14	0	15.1	.371	.381	1.000	1.1	1.4	.8	.0	.5	5.1

==== Playoffs ====
WNBA playoff statistics
Year	Team	GP	GS	MPG	FG%	3P%	FT%	RPG	APG	SPG	BPG	TO	PPG
2026	Las Vegas	5	0	11.0	.176	.000	—	.4	.4	.2	.2	.4	1.2
**Career**	1 year, 1 team	5	0	11.0	.176	.000	—	.4	.4	.2	.2	.4	1.2
