= 2019 FIBA 3x3 U23 World Cup – Women's tournament =

Tournament details
- Host country: China
- City: Lanzhou
- Dates: 2–6 October
- Teams: 20

Final positions
- Champions: Japan (1st title)
- Runners-up: Russia
- Third place: France
- Fourth place: Belarus

Tournament statistics
- MVP: (Japan) Mai Yamamoto

The 2019 FIBA 3x3 U23 World Cup – Women's tournament is the second edition of this championship. The event was held in Lanzhou, China. It was contested by 20 teams. Russia are the defending champions.

Japan won their first title with a win against Russia in a repeat of the 2018 final.

== Host selection ==
Chinese city, Lanzhou, was given the hosting rights on 17 July 2018. Although 2018 host city, Xi'an, originally planned to host it.

== Teams ==
FIBA announced the qualified teams on 19 December 2018.

Africa

- Uganda

Americas

- Dominican Republic

Asia and Oceania

- China (hosts)
- Indonesia
- Iran
- Japan
- Mongolia
- Sri Lanka
- Turkmenistan

Europe

- Belarus
- Czech Republic
- France
- Germany
- Hungary
- Netherlands
- Romania
- Russia
- Switzerland
- Ukraine

== Seeding ==
The pools were announced on 19 December 2018.

The seeding and groups were as follows:

Pool A	Pool B	Pool C	Pool D
Russia (1); Belarus (8); Indonesia (9); Czech Republic (16); Dominican Republic (17)	China (2) (H); Netherlands (7); Hungary (10); Switzerland (15); Sri Lanka (18)	Mongolia (3); Romania (6); Germany (11); Iran (14); Uganda (19)	Ukraine (4); France (5); Japan (12); Italy (13); Turkmenistan (20)

== Preliminary round ==
=== Pool A ===
Pos	Team	Pld	W	L	PF	PA	PD	Qualification	(Russia)	(Belarus)	(Czech Republic)	(Dominican Republic)	(Indonesia)
1	Russia	4	4	0	79	40	+39	Quarterfinals		15–12	21–18		
2	Belarus	4	3	1	75	51	+24	Quarterfinals				22–12	20–13
3	Czech Republic	4	2	2	72	64	+8			11–21		22–11	
4	Dominican Republic	4	1	3	49	82	−33		7–22				19–16
5	Indonesia	4	0	4	43	81	−38		3–21		11–21		

Source: FIBA
Rules for classification: 1) Wins; 2) Head-to-head record; 3) Points scored.

=== Pool B ===
Pos	Team	Pld	W	L	PF	PA	PD	Qualification	(Netherlands)	(China)	(Hungary)	(Switzerland)	(Sri Lanka)
1	Netherlands	4	4	0	73	43	+30	Quarterfinals			19–12		19–8
2	China (H)	4	3	1	63	44	+19	Quarterfinals	11–19			21–12	
3	Hungary	4	2	2	60	49	+11			7–10		21–14	
4	Switzerland	4	1	3	58	65	−7		12–16				20–7
5	Sri Lanka	4	0	4	27	80	−53			6–21	6–20		

Source: FIBA
Rules for classification: 1) Wins; 2) Head-to-head record; 3) Points scored.
(H) Hosts

=== Pool C ===
Pos	Team	Pld	W	L	PF	PA	PD	Qualification	(Mongolia)	(Germany)	(Romania)	(Iran)	(Uganda)
1	Mongolia	4	3	1	73	64	+9	Quarterfinals			20–21 OT	21–15	
2	Germany	4	3	1	72	34	+38	Quarterfinals	11–13 OT			21–6	
3	Romania	4	3	1	67	66	+1			9–21			19–12
4	Iran	4	1	3	47	70	−23				13–18		13–10
5	Uganda	4	0	4	45	70	−25		17–19	6–19			

Source: FIBA
Rules for classification: 1) Wins; 2) Head-to-head record; 3) Points scored.

=== Pool D ===
Pos	Team	Pld	W	L	PF	PA	PD	Qualification	(France)	(Japan)	(Ukraine)	(Italy)	(Turkmenistan)
1	France	4	3	1	76	40	+36	Quarterfinals		21–10			22–8
2	Japan	4	3	1	73	56	+17	Quarterfinals			20–11	21–20	
3	Ukraine	4	3	1	70	56	+14		16–13			21–19	
4	Italy	4	1	3	66	72	−6		6–20				21–10
5	Turkmenistan	4	0	4	26	87	−61			4–22	4–22		

Source: FIBA
Rules for classification: 1) Wins; 2) Head-to-head record; 3) Points scored.

== Knockout stage ==
All times are local.

Quarter-finals
6 October – 12:10
Russia	21
Germany	6
6 October – 12:35
France	18
China	17
6 October – 14:10
Netherlands	9
Japan	22
6 October – 14:35
Mongolia	10
Belarus	21

Semi-finals
6 October – 16:30
Russia	16
France	11
6 October – 16:55
Japan	16
Belarus	9

Final
6 October – 19:40
Russia	14
Japan	19
Bronze medal
6 October – 18:20
France	20
Belarus	14

== Final standings ==
=== Tiebreakers ===
- 1) Wins
- 2) Points scored
- 3) Seeding

Pos	Team	Pld	W	L	W%	PF	PA
1	Japan	7	6	1	86%	130	18.6
2	Russia	7	6	1	86%	130	18.6
3	France	7	5	2	71%	125	17.9
4	Belarus	7	4	3	57%	119	17.0
5	Netherlands	5	4	1	80%	82	16.4
6	Mongolia	5	3	2	60%	83	16.6
7	China	5	3	2	60%	80	16.0
8	Germany	5	3	2	60%	78	15.6
9	Ukraine	4	3	1	75%	70	17.5
10	Romania	4	3	1	50%	67	16.8
11	Czech Republic	4	2	2	50%	72	18.0
12	Hungary	4	2	2	50%	60	15.0
13	Italy	4	1	3	25%	66	16.5
14	Switzerland	4	1	3	25%	58	14.5
15	Dominican Republic	4	1	3	25%	49	12.3
16	Iran	4	1	3	25%	47	11.8
17	Uganda	4	0	4	0%	45	11.3
18	Indonesia	4	0	4	0%	43	10.8
19	Sri Lanka	4	0	4	0%	27	6.8
20	Turkmenistan	4	0	4	0%	26	6.5

== Awards ==
These players were given the awards after the competition:

=== Most valuable player ===
- (Japan) Mai Yamamoto

=== Top scorer ===
- (France) Victoria Majekodunmi (57 points)

=== Team of the tournament ===
- (Japan) Mai Yamamoto
- (France) Victoria Majekodunmi
- (Russia) Ekaterina Polyashova

== See also ==
- 2019 FIBA 3x3 World Cup – Men's tournament
- 2019 FIBA 3x3 World Cup – Women's tournament
- 2019 FIBA 3x3 U23 World Cup – Men's tournament
- 2019 FIBA 3x3 Asia Cup
- 2019 FIBA 3x3 Africa Cup
- 2019 FIBA 3x3 Europe Cup
