= 2025 FIBA 3x3 U23 World Cup – Women's tournament =

International basketball competition in China

Tournament details
- Host country: China
- City: Xiong'an
- Dates: 17–21 September
- Teams: 20

Final positions
- Champions: Netherlands (2nd title)
- Runners-up: France
- Third place: Spain
- Fourth place: Japan

Tournament statistics
- MVP: (Netherlands) Lotte van Kruistum

The 2025 FIBA 3x3 U23 World Cup – Women's tournament was the 6th edition of this championship. The event was held in Xiong'an, China. It was contested by 20 teams. United States are the defending champions.

Netherlands won their second title with a win against France in the final.

== Teams ==
Africa

- Algeria
- Egypt
- Uganda

Americas

- Chile
- Mexico
- United States
- Venezuela

Asia and Oceania

- China (hosts)
- Chinese Taipei
- Fiji
- Japan
- New Zealand
- Philippines

Europe

- Czech Republic
- France
- Germany
- Italy
- Netherlands
- Poland
- Spain

== Seeding ==
The seeding and groups were as follows:

Pool A	Pool B	Pool C	Pool D
China (1) (H); Italy (8); Japan (9); Egypt (16); Chinese Taipei (17)	Spain (2); Chile (7); United States (10); Mexico (15); Philippines (18)	Germany (3); France (6); Poland (11); Algeria (14); Venezuela (19)	Netherlands (4); Czech Republic (5); New Zealand (12); Uganda (13); Fiji (20)

== Venue ==
The venue was at the Xiong'an Country Park in Xiong'an.

== Preliminary round ==
=== Pool A ===
Pos	Team	Pld	W	L	PF	PA	PD	Qualification	(Japan)	(China)	(Italy)	(Egypt)	(Chinese Taipei)
1	Japan	4	4	0	80	66	+14	Quarterfinals		20–19		22–11	
2	China (H)	4	3	1	71	58	+13	Quarterfinals			14–13 OT	17–13	
3	Italy	4	2	2	73	49	+24		18–19				21–10
4	Egypt	4	1	3	51	79	−28				6–21		21–20
5	Chinese Taipei	4	0	4	60	83	−23		18–20	12–21			

Source: FIBA
Rules for classification: 1) Wins; 2) Head-to-head record; 3) Points scored.
(H) Hosts

=== Pool B ===
Pos	Team	Pld	W	L	PF	PA	PD	Qualification	(Spain)	(United States)	(Chile)	(Philippines)	(Mexico)
1	Spain	4	4	0	78	40	+38	Quarterfinals			21–6		22–11
2	United States	4	3	1	72	61	+11	Quarterfinals	12–18				19–11
3	Chile	4	2	2	57	70	−13			18–20		19–17	
4	Philippines	4	1	3	61	70	−9		11–18	14–21			
5	Mexico	4	0	4	46	73	−27				12–14	12–19	

Source: FIBA
Rules for classification: 1) Wins; 2) Head-to-head record; 3) Points scored.

=== Pool C ===
Pos	Team	Pld	W	L	PF	PA	PD	Qualification	(France)	(Poland)	(Germany)	(Venezuela)	(Algeria)
1	France	4	4	0	79	37	+42	Quarterfinals		21–11		21–7	
2	Poland	4	3	1	73	52	+21	Quarterfinals			20–18		21–4
3	Germany	4	2	2	71	51	+20		11–16				21–7
4	Venezuela	4	1	3	42	77	−35			9–22	8–22		
5	Algeria	4	0	4	33	81	−48		8–22			14–18	

Source: FIBA
Rules for classification: 1) Wins; 2) Head-to-head record; 3) Points scored.

=== Pool D ===
Pos	Team	Pld	W	L	PF	PA	PD	Qualification	(Netherlands)	(Czech Republic)	(New Zealand)	(Uganda)	(Fiji)
1	Netherlands	4	4	0	78	28	+50	Quarterfinals		16–14		20–9	
2	Czech Republic	4	3	1	69	39	+30	Quarterfinals			21–11		21–3
3	New Zealand	4	2	2	48	62	−14		3–21			19–13	
4	Uganda	4	1	3	52	55	−3			9–13			21–3
5	Fiji	4	0	4	15	78	−63		2–21		7–15		

Source: FIBA
Rules for classification: 1) Wins; 2) Head-to-head record; 3) Points scored.

== Knockout stage ==
All times are local.

Quarter-finals
21 September 13:20
Japan	17
Poland	11
21 September 13:45
Netherlands	21
United States	14
21 September 15:10
Spain	21
Czech Republic	17
21 September 15:35
France	19 (OT)
China	17

Semi-finals
21 September 17:50
Japan	18
Netherlands	20
21 September 18:15
Spain	17
France	18

Final
21 September 20:30
Netherlands	17
France	13
Bronze medal
21 September 19:40
Japan	12
Spain	18

== Final standings ==
=== Tiebreakers ===
- 1) Wins
- 2) Points scored
- 3) Seeding

Pos	Team	Pld	W	L	W%	PA	PF
1	Netherlands	7	7	0	100%	19.4	136
2	France	7	6	1	86%	18.4	129
3	Spain	7	6	1	86%	19.1	134
4	Japan	7	5	2	71%	18.1	127
5	China	5	3	2	60%	17.6	88
6	Czech Republic	5	3	2	60%	17.2	86
7	United States	5	3	2	60%	17.2	86
8	Poland	5	3	2	60%	16.8	84
9	Italy	4	2	2	50%	18.3	73
10	Germany	4	2	2	50%	17.8	71
11	Chile	4	2	2	50%	14.3	57
12	Germany	4	2	2	50%	15.8	63
13	New Zealand	4	2	2	50%	12.0	48
14	Uganda	4	1	3	25%	13.0	52
15	Egypt	4	1	3	25%	12.8	51
16	Venezuela	4	1	3	25%	10.5	42
17	Chinese Taipei	4	0	4	0%	14.0	60
18	Mexico	4	0	4	0%	11.5	46
19	Algeria	4	0	4	0%	8.3	33
20	Fiji	4	0	4	0%	3.8	15

== Awards ==
Team of the tournament
(Netherlands) Lotte van Kruistum	(France) Vaciana Gomis	(Spain) Marta García
Most valuable player
(Netherlands) Lotte van Kruistum
Top scorer
(Spain) Marta García (51 points)
