= Fred Drasner =

American media executive and lawyer (1943-2026)

- Born: 1943
- Died: 2026 (aged 82–83)
- Occupations: Media executive, lawyer, entrepreneur
- Employer(s): New York Daily News; U.S. News & World Report
- Known for: Co-owner and Vice Chairman of the Washington Redskins (1999–2004)

Fred Drasner (1943 – 2026) was an American media executive, lawyer, and entrepreneur. He was the head of the New York Daily News and U.S. News & World Report. From 1999 to 2004, he was a co-owner and Vice Chairman of the Washington Redskins.
