= 2022 FIBA 3x3 U17 Africa Cup =

2022 FIBA 3x3 U17 Africa Cup consists of two sections:

- 2022 FIBA 3x3 U17 Africa Cup – Men's tournament
- 2022 FIBA 3x3 U17 Africa Cup – Women's tournament
