= 2018 FIBA 3x3 U23 World Cup – Women's tournament =

Tournament details
- Host country: China
- City: Xi'an
- Dates: 3–7 October
- Teams: 20

Final positions
- Champions: Russia (1st title)
- Runners-up: Japan
- Third place: Ukraine
- Fourth place: Germany

Tournament statistics
- MVP: (Russia) Elizaveta Komarova

The 2018 FIBA 3x3 U23 World Cup – Women's tournament is the inaugural edition of this championship. The event was held in Xi'an, China. It was contested by 20 teams.

Russia won their first title with a win against Japan in the final.

== Host selection ==
Chinese city, Xi'an, was given the hosting rights on 17 July 2018.

== Teams ==
FIBA announced the qualified teams on 26 September 2018.

Africa

- Uganda

Americas

- Argentina

Asia and Oceania

- China (hosts)
- Indonesia
- Iran
- Japan
- Kazakhstan
- Malaysia
- Mongolia
- Sri Lanka

Europe

- Andorra
- Belarus
- Czech Republic
- France
- Germany
- Hungary
- Netherlands
- Romania
- Russia
- Ukraine

== Seeding ==
The pools were announced on 26 September 2018. The seeding and groups were as follows:

Pool A	Pool B	Pool C	Pool D
China (1) (H); Hungary (8); Romania (9); Germany (16); Uganda (17)	Ukraine (2); Netherlands (7); Indonesia (10); Kazakhstan (15); Belarus (18)	France (3); Mongolia (6); Japan (11); Czech Republic (14); Argentina (19)	Andorra (4); Russia (5); Sri Lanka (12); Iran (13); Malaysia (20)

== Preliminary round ==
=== Pool A ===
Pos	Team	Pld	W	L	PF	PA	PD	Qualification	(Germany)	(Hungary)	(China)	(Uganda)	(Romania)
1	Germany	4	3 (Note: Germany 14–11 Hungary)	1	50	43	+7	Quarterfinals		14–11		13–15	
2	Hungary	4	3	1	54	47	+7	Quarterfinals				14–8	13–10
3	China (H)	4	2 (Note: China 21–13 Uganda)	2	62	48	+14		8–11	15–16			
4	Uganda	4	2	2	53	59	−6				13–21		17–11
5	Romania	4	0	4	38	60	−22		9–12		8–18		

Source: FIBA
Rules for classification: 1) Wins; 2) Head-to-head record; 3) Points scored.
(H) Hosts

=== Pool B ===
Pos	Team	Pld	W	L	PF	PA	PD	Qualification	(Ukraine)	(Belarus)	(Netherlands)	(Indonesia)	(Kazakhstan)
1	Ukraine	4	3	1	68	48	+20	Quarterfinals			16–14		15–7
2	Belarus	4	3	1	63	47	+16	Quarterfinals	18–16			19–15	
3	Netherlands	4	3	1	61	43	+18			12–11		14–9	
4	Indonesia	4	1	3	48	66	−18		9–21				15–12
5	Kazakhstan	4	0	4	30	66	−36			4–15	7–21		

Source: FIBA
Rules for classification: 1) Wins; 2) Head-to-head record; 3) Points scored.

=== Pool C ===
Pos	Team	Pld	W	L	PF	PA	PD	Qualification	(Japan)	(Argentina)	(France)	(Czech Republic)	(Mongolia)
1	Japan	4	4	0	62	43	+19	Quarterfinals			11–10	19–15	
2	Argentina	4	3	1	60	38	+22	Quarterfinals	10–11		16–15		
3	France	4	2	2	68	43	+25					21–6	22–6
4	Czech Republic	4	1	3	53	75	−22			7–21			21–14
5	Mongolia	4	0	4	33	77	−44		8–21	5–13			

Source: FIBA
Rules for classification: 1) Wins; 2) Head-to-head record; 3) Points scored.

=== Pool D ===
Pos	Team	Pld	W	L	PF	PA	PD	Qualification	(Russia)	(Iran)	(Andorra)	(Malaysia)	(Sri Lanka)
1	Russia	4	4	0	78	28	+50	Quarterfinals				21–12	22–1
2	Iran	4	3	1	60	47	+13	Quarterfinals	5–19			13–12	
3	Andorra	4	2	2	63	72	−9		10–16	11–21			
4	Malaysia	4	1	3	64	57	+7				19–20		21–3
5	Sri Lanka	4	0	4	25	86	−61			5–21	16–22		

Source: FIBA
Rules for classification: 1) Wins; 2) Head-to-head record; 3) Points scored.

== Knockout stage ==
All times are local.

Quarter-finals
7 October – 13:50
Germany	13
Argentina	12
7 October – 14:15
Russia	19
Belarus	15
7 October – 15:55
Ukraine	21
Iran	8
7 October – 16:20
Japan	18
Hungary	12

Semi-finals
7 October – 18:00
Germany	10
Russia	16
7 October – 18:30
Ukraine	17
Japan	20

Final
7 October – 20:45
Russia	21
Japan	12
Bronze medal
7 October – 19:45
Germany	14
Ukraine	18

== Final standings ==
=== Tiebreakers ===
- 1) Wins
- 2) Points scored
- 3) Seeding

Pos	Team	Pld	W	L	PF	PA	PD
1	Russia	7	7	0	134	65	+69
2	Japan	7	6	1	112	93	+19
3	Ukraine	7	6	1	124	90	+34
4	Germany	7	4	3	87	89	–2
5	Belarus	5	3	2	78	66	+12
6	Argentina	5	3	2	72	51	+21
7	Iran	5	3	2	68	68	0
8	Hungary	5	3	2	66	65	+1
9	Netherlands	4	3	1	61	43	+18
10	France	4	2	2	68	43	+25
11	Andorra	4	2	2	63	72	–9
12	China	4	2	2	62	48	+14
13	Uganda	4	2	2	53	59	–6
14	Malaysia	4	1	3	64	57	+7
15	Czech Republic	4	1	3	53	75	–22
16	Indonesia	4	1	3	48	66	–18
17	Romania	4	0	4	38	60	–22
18	Mongolia	4	0	4	33	77	–44
19	Kazakhstan	4	0	4	30	66	–36
20	Sri Lanka	4	0	4	25	86	–61

== Awards ==
These players were given the awards after the competition:

=== Most valuable player ===
- (Russia) Elizaveta Komarova

=== Top scorer ===
- (Ukraine) Viktoriia Kondus (58 points)

=== Team of the tournament ===
- (Russia) Elizaveta Komarova
- (Japan) Mai Yamamoto
- (Ukraine) Viktoriia Kondus

== See also ==
- 2018 FIBA 3x3 World Cup – Men's tournament
- 2018 FIBA 3x3 World Cup – Women's tournament
- 2018 FIBA 3x3 U23 World Cup – Men's tournament
- 2018 FIBA 3x3 Asia Cup
- 2018 FIBA 3x3 Europe Cup
