= 2023 FIBA 3x3 U23 World Cup – Women's tournament =

Tournament details
- Host country: Poland
- City: Lublin
- Dates: 27 September–1 October
- Teams: 20

Final positions
- Champions: Netherlands (1st title)
- Runners-up: Poland
- Third place: Lithuania
- Fourth place: China

Tournament statistics
- MVP: (Netherlands) Zoë Slagter

The 2023 FIBA 3x3 U23 World Cup – Women's tournament is the 4th edition of this championship. The event was held in Lublin, Poland. It was contested by 20 teams. France are the defending champions.

Netherlands won their first title with a win against hosts Poland in the final.

== Host selection ==
Lublin was given the hosting rights on 16 December 2021.

== Teams ==
Africa

- Egypt
- Kenya
- Tunisia

Americas

- Chile
- United States

Asia and Oceania

- China
- Japan
- Mongolia
- Thailand

Europe

- Austria
- Czech Republic
- France
- Germany
- Greece
- Hungary
- Italy
- Lithuania
- Netherlands
- Poland (hosts)
- Romania

== Seeding ==
The pools were announced on 13 September 2023.

The seeding and groups were as follows:

| Pool A | Pool B | Pool C | Pool D |
|---|---|---|---|
| China (1); United States (8); Netherlands (9); Kenya (16); Austria (17) | Germany (2); Lithuania (7); Poland (10) (H); Tunisia (15); Greece (18) | France (3); Egypt (6); Italy (11); Thailand (14); Hungary (19) | Japan (4); Mongolia (5); Czech Republic (12); Romania (13); Chile (20) |

== Preliminary round ==
=== Pool A ===
| Pos | Team | Pld | W | L | PF | PA | PD | Qualification | (China) | (Netherlands) | (United States) | (Kenya) | (Austria) |
|---|---|---|---|---|---|---|---|---|---|---|---|---|---|
| 1 | China | 4 | 3 (Note: China 21–15 Netherlands) | 1 | 75 | 68 | +7 | Quarterfinals | | | 22–20 OT | 21–11 | |
| 2 | Netherlands | 4 | 3 | 1 | 77 | 59 | +18 | Quarterfinals | 15–21 | | | 22–5 | |
| 3 | United States | 4 | 2 | 2 | 79 | 69 | +10 | | | 19–21 | | | 19–14 |
| 4 | Kenya | 4 | 1 (Note: Kenya 21–9 Austria) | 3 | 49 | 73 | −24 | | | | 12–21 | | 21–9 |
| 5 | Austria | 4 | 1 | 3 | 59 | 70 | −11 | | 22–11 | 14–19 | | | |

Source: FIBA
Rules for classification: 1) Wins; 2) Head-to-head record; 3) Points scored.

=== Pool B ===
| Pos | Team | Pld | W | L | PF | PA | PD | Qualification | (Lithuania) | (Poland) | (Germany) | (Tunisia) | (Greece) |
|---|---|---|---|---|---|---|---|---|---|---|---|---|---|
| 1 | Lithuania | 4 | 3 | 1 | 78 | 59 | +19 | Quarterfinals | | 15–14 OT | | | 21–17 |
| 2 | Poland (H) | 4 | 3 | 1 | 75 | 63 | +12 | Quarterfinals | | | 22–17 | 21–15 | |
| 3 | Germany | 4 | 3 | 1 | 74 | 62 | +12 | | 22–21 OT | | | 21–6 | |
| 4 | Tunisia | 4 | 1 | 3 | 47 | 73 | −26 | | 6–21 | | | | 20–10 |
| 5 | Greece | 4 | 0 | 4 | 56 | 73 | −17 | | | 16–18 OT | 13–14 | | |

Source: FIBA
Rules for classification: 1) Wins; 2) Head-to-head record; 3) Points scored.
(H) Hosts

=== Pool C ===
| Pos | Team | Pld | W | L | PF | PA | PD | Qualification | (Hungary) | (France) | (Italy) | (Egypt) | (Thailand) |
|---|---|---|---|---|---|---|---|---|---|---|---|---|---|
| 1 | Hungary | 4 | 3 | 1 | 79 | 51 | +28 | Quarterfinals | | 15–21 | 21–10 | | |
| 2 | France | 4 | 3 | 1 | 76 | 52 | +24 | Quarterfinals | | | | 18–15 | 21–4 |
| 3 | Italy | 4 | 3 | 1 | 70 | 58 | +12 | | | 18–16 OT | | | 21–7 |
| 4 | Egypt | 4 | 1 | 3 | 63 | 68 | −5 | | 13–22 | | 14–21 | | |
| 5 | Thailand | 4 | 0 | 4 | 25 | 84 | −59 | | 7–21 | | | 7–21 | |

Source: FIBA
Rules for classification: 1) Wins; 2) Head-to-head record; 3) Points scored.

=== Pool D ===
| Pos | Team | Pld | W | L | PF | PA | PD | Qualification | (Japan) | (Czech Republic) | (Chile) | (Mongolia) | (Romania) |
|---|---|---|---|---|---|---|---|---|---|---|---|---|---|
| 1 | Japan | 4 | 4 | 0 | 74 | 36 | +38 | Quarterfinals | | | | 22–7 | 17–5 |
| 2 | Czech Republic | 4 | 3 | 1 | 68 | 68 | 0 | Quarterfinals | 13–21 | | | | 16–15 |
| 3 | Chile | 4 | 2 | 2 | 69 | 53 | +16 | | 11–14 | 15–17 | | | |
| 4 | Mongolia | 4 | 1 | 3 | 52 | 84 | −32 | | | 17–22 | 8–22 | | |
| 5 | Romania | 4 | 0 | 4 | 52 | 74 | −22 | | | | 14–21 | 18–20 | |

Source: FIBA
Rules for classification: 1) Wins; 2) Head-to-head record; 3) Points scored.

== Knockout stage ==
All times are local.

Quarter-finals
Oct 1, 2023 – 11:10 AM
China | 19
France | 17
Oct 1, 2023 – 11:35 AM
Netherlands
Spain
Oct 1, 2023 – 12:00 PM
Poland
China
Oct 1, 2023 – 12:25 PM
United States
France

Semi-finals
Oct 1, 2023 4:10 PM
China | 15
Poland | 17 OT
Oct 1, 2023 4:35 PM
QF game 3 winner
QF game 4 winner | 21 OT

Final
Oct 1, 2023 7:10 PM
Poland | 17
Netherlands | 19 OT
Bronze medal
Oct 1, 2023 6:20 PM
China | 12
Lithuania | 19

== Final standings ==
=== Tiebreakers ===
- 1) Wins
- 2) Points scored
- 3) Seeding

| Pos | Team | Pld | W | L | W% | PF | PA |
|---|---|---|---|---|---|---|---|
| 1 | Netherlands | 7 | 6 | 1 | 86% | 133 | 17.1 |
| 2 | Poland | 7 | 5 | 2 | 71% | 120 | 19.1 |
| 3 | Lithuania | 7 | 5 | 2 | 71% | 134 | 17.3 |
| 4 | China | 7 | 4 | 3 | 57% | 121 | 16.4 |
| 5 | Japan | 5 | 4 | 1 | 60% | 82 | 18.6 |
| 6 | France | 5 | 3 | 2 | 60% | 93 | 18.2 |
| 7 | Hungary | 5 | 3 | 2 | 60% | 91 | 18.2 |
| 8 | Czech Republic | 5 | 3 | 2 | 60% | 82 | 16.4 |
| 9 | Germany | 4 | 3 | 1 | 75% | 74 | 18.5 |
| 10 | Italy | 4 | 3 | 1 | 75% | 70 | 17.5 |
| 11 | United States | 4 | 2 | 2 | 50% | 79 | 19.8 |
| 12 | Chile | 4 | 2 | 2 | 50% | 69 | 17.3 |
| 13 | Egypt | 4 | 1 | 3 | 25% | 63 | 15.8 |
| 14 | Austria | 4 | 1 | 3 | 25% | 59 | 14.8 |
| 15 | Mongolia | 4 | 1 | 3 | 25% | 52 | 13.0 |
| 16 | Kenya | 4 | 1 | 3 | 25% | 49 | 12.3 |
| 17 | Tunisia | 4 | 1 | 3 | 25% | 47 | 11.8 |
| 18 | Greece | 4 | 0 | 4 | 0% | 56 | 14.0 |
| 19 | Romania | 4 | 0 | 4 | 0% | 52 | 13.0 |
| 20 | Thailand | 4 | 0 | 4 | 0% | 25 | 6.3 |

== Awards ==
Team of the tournament
| (Netherlands) Zoë Slagter | (Poland) Aleksandra Ziemborska | (Lithuania) Egle Zabotkaite |
Most valuable player
(Netherlands) Zoë Slagter
Top scorer
(China) Ming Zheng (56 points)

== See also ==
- 2023 FIBA 3x3 U23 World Cup – Men's tournament
- 2023 FIBA 3x3 World Cup – Men's tournament
- 2023 FIBA 3x3 World Cup – Women's tournament
- 2023 FIBA 3x3 U18 World Cup
- 2023 FIBA 3x3 AmeriCup
- 2023 FIBA 3x3 Africa Cup
- 2023 FIBA 3x3 U17 Africa Cup
- 2023 FIBA 3x3 Asia Cup
- 2023 FIBA 3x3 Europe Cup
