= 2023 FIBA 3x3 U23 World Cup – Men's tournament =

Tournament details
- Host country: Poland
- City: Lublin
- Dates: 27 September–1 October
- Teams: 20

Final positions
- Champions: United States (1st title)
- Runners-up: Israel
- Third place: Germany
- Fourth place: France

Tournament statistics
- MVP: (United States) Trey McGowens

The 2023 FIBA 3x3 U23 World Cup – Men's tournament is the 4th edition of this championship. The event was held in Lublin, Poland. It was contested by 20 teams. Poland are the defending champions.

United States won their first title with a win against Israel in the final.

== Host selection ==
Lublin was given the hosting rights on 16 December 2021.

== Teams ==
Africa

- Benin
- Egypt
- Kenya
- Tunisia (withdrew)

Americas

- Chile
- United States

Asia and Oceania

- China
- Japan
- Mongolia
- Qatar

Europe

- Austria
- Czech Republic
- France
- Germany
- Israel
- Italy
- Lithuania
- Netherlands
- Poland (hosts)
- Romania

== Seeding ==
The pools were announced on 13 September 2023.

The seeding and groups were as follows:

Pool A	Pool B	Pool C	Pool D
Mongolia (1); Czech Republic (8); Netherlands (10); China (16); Chile (17)	France (2); Poland (7) (H); Austria (10); Romania (15); Benin (18)	Germany (3); Israel (6); Qatar (11); Tunisia (14); Kenya (19)	Lithuania (4); Japan (5); Italy (12); Egypt (13); United States (20)

== Preliminary round ==
=== Pool A ===
Pos	Team	Pld	W	L	PF	PA	PD	Qualification	(Czech Republic)	(Chile)	(Netherlands)	(Mongolia)	(China)
1	Czech Republic	4	3 (Note: Czech Republic 20–12 Chile)	1	77	62	+15	Quarterfinals		20–12	18–13		
2	Chile	4	3	1	68	68	0	Quarterfinals			17–14	19–17 OT	
3	Netherlands	4	2 (Note: Netherlands 14–6 Mongolia)	2	62	57	+5					14–6	21–16
4	Mongolia	4	2	2	63	60	+3		19–18				21–9
5	China	4	0	4	60	83	−23		18–21	17–20			

Source: FIBA
Rules for classification: 1) Wins; 2) Head-to-head record; 3) Points scored.

=== Pool B ===
Pos	Team	Pld	W	L	PF	PA	PD	Qualification	(France)	(Romania)	(Austria)	(Benin)	(Poland)
1	France	4	4	0	80	54	+26	Quarterfinals		17–15 OT			21–13
2	Romania	4	2 (Note: Romania 21–10 Austria)	2	66	61	+5	Quarterfinals				18–12	12–22
3	Austria	4	2	2	70	67	+3		17–21	10–21			
4	Benin	4	1 (Note: Benin 16–15 Poland)	3	47	76	−29		9–21		10–22		
5	Poland (H)	4	1	3	65	70	−5				15–21	15–16	

Source: FIBA
Rules for classification: 1) Wins; 2) Head-to-head record; 3) Points scored.
(H) Hosts

=== Pool C ===
Pos	Team	Pld	W	L	PF	PA	PD	Qualification	(Israel)	(Germany)	(Qatar)	(Kenya)	(Tunisia)
1	Israel	3	3	0	62	45	+17	Quarterfinals			22–13	21–15	
2	Germany	3	2	1	59	39	+20	Quarterfinals	17–19 OT			19–17	
3	Qatar	3	1	2	40	59	−19		13–22	9–22			
4	Kenya	3	0	3	44	62	−18			14–20	15–21		
5	Tunisia	0	0	0	0	0	0	Withdrew					

Source: FIBA
Rules for classification: 1) Wins; 2) Head-to-head record; 3) Points scored.

=== Pool D ===
Pos	Team	Pld	W	L	PF	PA	PD	Qualification	(United States)	(Lithuania)	(Italy)	(Egypt)	(Japan)
1	United States	4	4	0	84	55	+29	Quarterfinals		21–16	21–16		
2	Lithuania	4	3	1	78	69	+9	Quarterfinals				20–18	21–14
3	Italy	4	2	2	74	74	0			16–21		21–16	
4	Egypt	4	1	3	66	78	−12		11–21				21–16
5	Japan	4	0	4	58	84	−26		12–21		16–21		

Source: FIBA
Rules for classification: 1) Wins; 2) Head-to-head record; 3) Points scored.

== Knockout stage ==
All times are local.

Quarter-finals
1 October – 12:00
Czech Republic	20
Germany	21 OT
1 October – 12:25
United States	21
Romania	13
1 October – 13:50
France	18
Lithuania	17
1 October – 14:15
Israel	18 OT
Chile	16

Semi-finals
1 October – 17:00
Germany	10
United States	21
1 October – 17:25
France	16
Israel	21

Final
1 October – 19:35
United States	21
Israel	3
Bronze medal
1 October – 18:45
Germany	22
France	14

== Final standings ==
=== Tiebreakers ===
- 1) Wins
- 2) Points scored
- 3) Seeding

Pos	Team	Pld	W	L	W%	PF	PA
1	United States	7	7	0	100%	147	21.0
2	Israel	7	6	1	86%	104	17.3
3	Germany	7	5	2	71%	112	18.7
4	France	7	5	2	71%	128	18.3
5	Czech Republic	5	3	2	60%	97	19.4
6	Lithuania	5	3	2	60%	95	19.0
7	Chile	5	3	2	60%	84	16.8
8	Romania	5	2	3	40%	79	15.8
9	Italy	4	2	2	50%	74	18.5
10	Austria	4	2	2	50%	70	17.5
11	Mongolia	4	2	2	50%	63	15.8
12	Netherlands	4	2	2	50%	62	15.5
13	Qatar	4	2	2	50%	40	13.3
14	Egypt	4	1	3	25%	66	16.5
15	Poland	4	1	3	25%	65	16.3
16	Kenya	4	1	3	25%	44	14.7
17	Benin	4	1	3	25%	48	11.7
18	China	4	0	4	0%	60	15.0
19	Japan	4	0	4	0%	58	14.5
20	Tunisia	0	0	0	0%	0.0	0

== Awards ==
Team of the tournament
(United States) Trey McGowens	(Israel) Omer Sadeh	(Germany) Leon Fertig
Most valuable player
(United States) Trey McGowens
Top scorer
(United States) Trey McGowens (54 points)

== See also ==
- 2023 FIBA 3x3 U23 World Cup – Women's tournament
- 2023 FIBA 3x3 World Cup – Men's tournament
- 2023 FIBA 3x3 World Cup – Women's tournament
- 2023 FIBA 3x3 U18 World Cup
- 2023 FIBA 3x3 AmeriCup
- 2023 FIBA 3x3 Africa Cup
- 2023 FIBA 3x3 U17 Africa Cup
- 2023 FIBA 3x3 Asia Cup
- 2023 FIBA 3x3 Europe Cup
