= Ciarrocca =

Ciarrocca is an Italian surname. Notable people with the surname include:

- Franco Ciarrocca (born 2004), Argentine basketball player
- Kirk Ciarrocca (born 1965), American football coach
- Luca Ciarrocca (born 1953), Italian journalist
