= Wall Street Italia =

- Type: Business, finance, politics
- Format: website
- Owner: T-Mediahouse Srl
- Editor-in-chief: Leopoldo Gasbarro
- Founded: 1999
- Language: Italian
- Headquarters: IT, Italy
- Country: Italy
- Website: www.wallstreetitalia.com

Wall Street Italia (WSI) is a news website in Italy, specialized in business, financial, political news and analysis aimed to institutional and private investors. It is published by T.Mediahouse Srl.

== Description ==
Wall Street Italia is not a broker, consequently, it can be considered "market neutral" for private and institutional investors who are active in the global market. Furthermore, WSI has never received public contributions or subsidies of any kind (contrary to a common practice in Italy).

== History ==
Founded in New York in October 1999 by longtime financial journalist Luca Ciarrocca (who holds a degrees in law and a Master in Business Administration) Wall Street Italia went through all Internet cycles: boom, crisis, restructuring. In 2001 HdpNet, the media company controlled by RCS Media Group – Corriere della Sera (the largest public media company in Italy) acquired 30,24% of WSI shares. After a "buy back" of RCS Media Group's shares and in spite of economic and financial crisis (the worst since the Great Depression), starting from 2008 WSI experienced a substantial increase in web traffic.
