= 2026 FIBA 3x3 U23 World Cup – Men's tournament =

Tournament details
- Host country: China
- City: Wuhan
- Dates: 15–19 September
- Teams: 20

Final positions
- Champions: Lithuania (2nd title)
- Runners-up: Latvia
- Third place: Australia
- Fourth place: Serbia

Tournament statistics
- MVP: (Lithuania) Paulius Velutis
- Top scorer: (Serbia) Vuk Vukićević (9.0 ppg)
- Top rebounds: (Australia) Griffin Biwer (6.9 rpg)

The 2026 FIBA 3x3 U23 World Cup – Men's tournament was the 7th edition of the FIBA 3x3 U23 World Cup, the annual international 3x3 basketball championship organised under the auspices of FIBA for under-23 men's national teams across the world.

The tournament took place in Wuhan, marking the first time the city hosts the event and fourth time it will be in China after, 2018, 2019, and 2025.

Twenty teams took part for the seventh time. Lithuania are the defending champions after beating Serbia in the final in Xiong'an.

Lithuania won their second title with a win against Latvia in the final.

== Participating nations ==
Host China as well as defending champions Lithuania automatically qualifies. The winner of the FIBA 3x3 Nations League conferences as well as the best performing team across all conferences qualified.

=== Qualification ===
Qualification method		Berths	Qualified team
Host nation		1	China
2025 FIBA 3x3 U23 World Cup champions		1	Lithuania
FIBA 3x3 Nations League	2026 Americas North Conference	1	United States
FIBA 3x3 Nations League	2026 Africa East Conference	1	Kenya
FIBA 3x3 Nations League	2026 Pacific Conference	1	Tonga
FIBA 3x3 Nations League	2026 FIBA 3x3 Nations League Asia Conference	1	Philippines

== Seeding ==
The seeding and groups were as follows:

Pool A	Pool B	Pool C	Pool D
Germany (1); Netherlands (8); Serbia (9); Kazakhstan (16); Tonga (17)	Latvia (2); New Zealand (7); Spain (10); Egypt (15); Philippines (18)	Algeria (3); France (6); Poland (11); Kenya (14); Australia (19)	China (4) (H); Lithuania (5); United States (12); Argentina (13); South Korea (20)

== Preliminary round ==
=== Pool A ===
Pos	Team	Pld	W	L	PF	PA	PD	Qualification	(Serbia)	(Netherlands)	(Germany)	(Kazakhstan)	(Tonga)
1	Serbia	4	4	0	84	46	+38	Quarterfinals			21–13	21–11	
2	Netherlands	4	3	1	75	57	+18	Quarterfinals	15–21				21–12
3	Germany	4	2	2	69	64	+5			15–18		21–14	
4	Kazakhstan	4	1	3	55	77	−22			9–22			21–14
5	Tonga	4	0	4	44	83	−39		7–21		11–20		

Source: FIBA
Rules for classification: 1) Wins; 2) Head-to-head record; 3) Points scored.

=== Pool B ===
Pos	Team	Pld	W	L	PF	PA	PD	Qualification	(Latvia)	(New Zealand)	(Spain)	(Egypt)	(Philippines)
1	Latvia	4	4	0	81	48	+33	Quarterfinals		21–16		21–9	
2	New Zealand	4	3	1	78	63	+15	Quarterfinals			20–15		21–11
3	Spain	4	2	2	64	68	−4		12–18			16–15	
4	Egypt	4	1	3	61	74	−13			16–21			21–16
5	Philippines	4	0	4	53	84	−31		11–21		15–21		

Source: FIBA
Rules for classification: 1) Wins; 2) Head-to-head record; 3) Points scored.

=== Pool C ===
Pos	Team	Pld	W	L	PF	PA	PD	Qualification	(Australia)	(France)	(Poland)	(Algeria)	(Kenya)
1	Australia	4	4	0	84	60	+24	Quarterfinals			21–18	21–13	
2	France	4	3	1	82	54	+28	Quarterfinals	21–22 OT		20–13		
3	Poland	4	2	2	73	72	+1					21–14	21–17
4	Algeria	4	1	3	60	80	−20			14–20			19–18
5	Kenya	4	0	4	49	82	−33		8–21	6–21			

Source: FIBA
Rules for classification: 1) Wins; 2) Head-to-head record; 3) Points scored.

=== Pool D ===
Pos	Team	Pld	W	L	PF	PA	PD	Qualification	(Lithuania)	(United States)	(Argentina)	(South Korea)	(China)
1	Lithuania	4	4	0	83	60	+23	Quarterfinals		21–14		20–18	
2	United States	4	2	2	70	73	−3	Quarterfinals			21–14		21–17
3	Argentina	4	2	2	65	75	−10		12–21			21–20	
4	South Korea	4	1	3	70	71	−1			21–14			11–16
5	China	4	1	3	62	71	−9		16–22		13–18		

Source: FIBA
Rules for classification: 1) Wins; 2) Head-to-head record; 3) Points scored.

== Knockout stage ==
All times are local.

Quarter-finals
19 September 14:10
Serbia	22
France	19
19 September 14:35
Lithuania	21
New Zealand	17
19 September 16:00
Latvia	19
United States	17
19 September 16:25
Australia	21
Netherlands	17

Semi-finals
19 September 18:40
Serbia	15
Lithuania	22
19 September 19:05
Latvia	21
Australia	18

Final
19 September 20:05
Lithuania	19
Latvia	18
Bronze medal
19 September 20:55
Serbia	20
Australia	22 (OT)

== Final standings ==
=== Tiebreakers ===
- 1) Wins
- 2) Points scored
- 3) Seeding

Pos	Team	Pld	W	L	W%	PA	PF
1	Lithuania	7	7	0	100%	20.6	144
2	Latvia	7	6	1	86%	19.9	139
3	Australia	7	6	1	86%	20.6	144
4	Serbia	7	5	2	71%	20.0	140
5	France	5	3	2	60%	20.2	101
6	New Zealand	5	3	2	60%	19.0	95
7	Netherlands	5	3	2	60%	18.4	92
8	United States	5	2	3	40%	17.4	87
9	Poland	4	2	2	50%	18.3	73
10	Germany	4	2	2	50%	17.3	69
11	Argentina	4	2	2	50%	16.3	65
12	Spain	4	2	2	50%	16.0	64
13	South Korea	4	1	3	25%	17.5	70
14	China	4	1	3	25%	15.5	62
15	Egypt	4	1	3	25%	15.3	61
16	Algeria	4	1	3	25%	15.0	60
17	Kazakhstan	4	1	3	25%	13.8	55
18	Philippines	4	0	4	0%	13.3	53
19	Kenya	4	0	4	0%	12.3	49
20	Tonga	4	0	4	0%	11.0	44

== See also ==
- 2026 FIBA 3x3 U23 World Cup – Women's tournament
- 2026 FIBA 3x3 World Cup – Men's tournament
- 2026 FIBA 3x3 World Cup – Women's tournament
