= Sydney Johnson =

American basketball player-coach

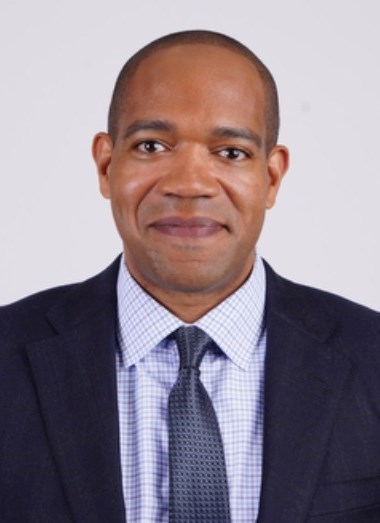
- Johnson in 2020

Washington Mystics
- Position: Head coach
- League: WNBA

Personal information
- Born: April 26, 1974 (age 52) Lansing, Michigan, U.S.

Career information
- High school: Moorhead (Moorhead, Minnesota); Towson Catholic (Towson, Maryland); Fork Union Military Academy (Fork Union, Virginia)
- College: Princeton (1993–1997)
- NBA draft: 1997: undrafted
- Playing career: 1997–2004
- Coaching career: 2004–present

Career history

Playing
- 1997–1998: Nuova Pallacanestro Gorizia
- 1998–1999: Viola Reggio Calabria
- 2000–2002: S.S. Felice Scandone
- 2003–2004: Montepaschi Siena

Coaching
- 2004–2007: Georgetown (assistant)
- 2007–2011: Princeton
- 2011–2019: Fairfield
- 2020–2021: Air Force (AHC)
- 2024: Chicago Sky (assistant)
- 2025–present: Washington Mystics

Career highlights
- As head coach: Ivy League regular season (2011); 2× Ivy League Coach of the Year (2010, 2011); As player: LBA champion (2004); 2× Serie A2 champion (1998, 1999); Ivy League Player of the Year (1997)

Sydney Johnson (born April 26, 1974) is an American professional basketball coach and former player who is the head coach of the Washington Mystics of the Women's National Basketball Association (WNBA). A 1997 Princeton alumnus, Johnson played for the Princeton Tigers men's basketball from 1993 to 1997.

As a player, he was a member of the 1995–96 Ivy League champions and the undefeated (in conference) 1996–97 Princeton Tigers. He earned Ivy League Men's Basketball Player of the Year recognition for the undefeated 1997 team. He continues to hold the Ivy League records for consecutive three-point shots made and most single-game three-point shots made without a miss. He also holds Princeton's record for career steals. His college career was marked by many memorable overtime performances, game-winning shots and game-clinching free throws. Nonetheless, his greatest recognition came for his defense. During a seven-year professional playing career, he won three championships in Europe.

After transitioning into coaching, Johnson began as an assistant coach at Georgetown, where he was part of the 2006–07 Big East Conference champions. In 2007, he became the youngest head coach in the Ivy League when hired by Princeton. Over his four-year tenure, he led the Tigers to the 2011 Ivy League title and an NCAA tournament appearance. He then served as head coach for the Fairfield Stags from 2011 to 2019. Johnson worked as associate head coach at Air Force during the 2020–21 season.

Beyond collegiate coaching, Johnson coached 3x3 basketball for USA Basketball and worked as an assistant coach for the Chicago Sky in the WNBA.

== Playing career ==
Johnson spent much of his childhood in Baltimore. He played his sophomore and junior season of high school basketball at Moorhead Senior High School in Moorhead, Minnesota. Johnson transferred from Minnesota to Towson Catholic High School prior to his senior season. During the early signing period from November 13 through November 20, 1991, Johnson, who was considering several Ivy League schools as well as Northeastern University, verbally committed to Boston University. On December 1, 1991, Boston University announced that Johnson signed a letter of intent. During his senior season, Johnson lead Towson to the Baltimore Catholic Basketball League Championship. Following the season, he earned Baltimore Catholic Basketball League All-league first-team recognition. He was also selected to participate in the Rodney Beasley East vs. West All-Star Games, sponsored by the Baltimore Metro Coaches Association. He was also a second team All-metro selection and following his 1992 graduation attended the Fork Union Military Academy in Virginia for a postgraduate year. In April 1993, after playing a year a Fork Union, Johnson signed a letter of intent with Herb Sendek's Miami (OH) team, but upon being accepted by Princeton University in June of that year, he revoked his letter.

Johnson showed strong leadership skills early at Princeton and is the only three-time captain in university history. During his freshman year, he was twice named Ivy League Men's Basketball Rookie of the Week for the 1993–94 team. That season the 11–3 Tigers could not match the Penn Quakers who were led by Jerome Allen and Matt Maloney. Johnson provided heroics for the 1994–95 Tigers on a couple of occasions. On December 27, 1994, he hit what The New York Times described as "a falling-down 3-point basket with three seconds left in regulation". The basket forced overtime. At the end of the third overtime period Johnson converted two foul shots with three seconds left to cement a 71–66 victory over Texas A&M. Later that season, he set a career-high with a 25-point performance against Harvard in a double-overtime victory. He recorded seven steals in a game against Brown on February 3, 1995, which is one shy of the school record. Again the Tigers could not get past Penn.

As a junior, he was named Ivy League Player of the week for the second weekend in February as he led the team on both ends of the court. The following week, he posted 21 points against Yale, which established his season-high. Even after Allen and Maloney graduated, Princeton's only two losses were to Penn. After Princeton and Penn ended the 1995–96 season tied as Ivy League Co-Champions, Johnson made the decisive three point shot with one minute and four seconds remaining in overtime in the one-game playoff, corralled a defensive rebound, added a pair of free throws with 24 seconds left and then made a steal. The win ended an eight-game losing streak to Penn. The win earned the team the conference automatic bid to the 1996 NCAA tournament and following the game head coach Pete Carril announced his retirement. The thirteen seeded team was matched against the defending national champion UCLA Bruins in its first round pairing. He was the team's leading scorer with 11 points in the 43–41 first round victory over UCLA in the 1996 NCAA Tournament. The team fell behind 41–34 with over six minutes remaining. His 3-of-7 three point shooting performance included a shot to bring the team to within 4. He also made the game-tying layup to knot the score at 41. He also defended Toby Bailey's last second shot after Princeton took the lead with 3.9 seconds remaining. During the game, UCLA jumped out to a 7–0 lead at the first TV timeout, and Johnson's leadership held the team together early when UCLA looked strong.

As a senior, his new head coach, Bill Carmody described him as a shutdown defender. He was 1997 Ivy League Men's basketball Player of the Year. Johnson earned the award for his defense and was the first winner with a single-digit scoring average. He scored 15 on February 22, when Princeton clinched the Ivy League regular season championship by defeating Dartmouth. The following week, he established Ivy League records for most consecutive three-point field goals made, with 11, and the most single-game three-point field goals made with no misses (6 for 6) against Columbia Lions men's basketball on February 28, 1997, and Cornell Big Red men's basketball (first 5) on March 1, 1997. He had twelve points in the regular season finale during which Princeton tied the school record with its nineteenth consecutive win. In the 1997 NCAA tournament opening round matchup against the Cal Bears, when a final second pass was intercepted, he attempted to shoulder the blame with the press. He retired as the Princeton University all-time leader in steals. His 169 total steals were fifth in Ivy League history at the end of his career and was eleventh at the end of the 2009-10 NCAA Division I men's basketball season. He retired second in Princeton history in career three point shots and fourth in career assists. When Johnson established his Ivy League three-point shot records, the three-point line was at 19 feet 9 inches (6.02 metres), but for the 2008–09 NCAA Division I men's basketball season, the NCAA men's basketball three-point line was extended to 20 feet 9 inches (6.32 metres). For the 2019–20 NCAA Division I men's basketball season, the line was further extended to 22 feet 1.75 inches (6.75 metres). As of February 12, 2024, Johnson's 11 consecutive three-point shots record stood alone in Ivy League history, but 3 subsequent players had tied his 6–6 single-game performance (Christian Webster — Harvard -vs- Appalachian St., March 27, 2010; Siyani Chambers — Harvard -vs- Vermont, Dec. 21, 2013; Devin Cannady — Princeton -vs- Fairleigh Dickinson, Nov. 26, 2017). Although Johnsons career steals total had fallen to 12th in the Ivy League, it remained the highest total by a Princeton Tiger.

After writing his senior thesis on Kenyan education under British colonial rule and graduating with a bachelor's degree in history, Johnson declined the postgraduate scholarship that he was awarded and played five years in Italy followed by two in Spain. Johnson played professional basketball in the Lega Basket Serie A and Legadue Basket in Italy and Liga Española de Baloncesto in Spain, one season each for Gorizia Pallacanestro A2, Viola Reggio Calabria, Adecco Milano/Ducato Siena, Casademont Girona and Montepaschi Siena. He played two seasons with the Avellino in Italy from 2000 to 2002. He had a seven-year professional career before becoming a coach. In 1998, he won an Italian Second Division championship as a starter for Gorizia Pallacanestro. In 1999, he earned another league championship with for Reggio Calabria, and in his final professional season in 2004 he earned a league title with Siena. With Reggio Calabria, he teamed with Brent Scott, Brian Oliver, and Manu Ginóbili to win a championship.

== Coaching career ==
=== Georgetown (2004–2007) ===
Johnson was then brought on as an assistant to the newly appointed head coach at Georgetown, John Thompson III, in 2004. The team was coming off of a losing record and made it to a 2005 National Invitation Tournament. The team reached the Sweet Sixteen round of the 2006 NCAA Division I men's basketball tournament. During his tenure at Georgetown, he helped coach the team to an overall 72–30 record over 3 seasons and the 2006–07 team the 2007 Big East regular season championship, the 2007 Big East men's basketball tournament championship, and a trip to the Final Four of the 2007 NCAA Division I men's basketball tournament.

=== Princeton (2007–2011) ===
When Scott abandoned his struggling Princeton team to coach at Denver in 2007, athletic director Gary Walters hired Johnson to take over the program. Johnson emerged from a field of Princeton offense veterans that included Mike Brennan, Robert Burke, Craig Robinson, Bill Carmody, Armond Hill, Chris Mooney, and Mitch Henderson. Johnson's demeanor as a coach was said by players to be more benevolent than his predecessor, Joe Scott, who left for the University of Denver after compiling a losing record in three years at Princeton. He was regarded as an inexperienced coach because he only had three years of experience as an assistant coach. He became the youngest coach in the Ivy League. Johnson inherited a team that had gone 2–12 in conference the prior season and 38–45 overall during the prior three season. Among the lowlights that the team had achieved during the Scott era was a 21-point performance that tied the record for fewest points since the inception of the three-point shot and the shot clock. The team had ranked last in the nation in scoring in both 2006 and 2007. Although race is an issue among collegiate coaching ranks, in Johnson's first year, he was one of six African-American men's basketball head coaches in the 8-team Ivy League. Johnson employs the Princeton offense. Former Tiger stars Brian Earl and Scott Greenman were among Johnson's assistants at Princeton.

After a tumultuous first season of rebuilding during which it posted a 3–11 record, Princeton began to show great improvement in 2008–2009. Even with only three games left on their schedule and a 7–4 conference record, they still controlled their own destiny for a possible postseason bid. They finished 13–14 with an 8–6 record in the Ivy League, which tied them with Yale for second place. Along the way, the Tigers defeated Fordham, UNC-Greensboro, and Lehigh during their non-conference schedule and also notched wins over Harvard twice. One highlight of the season was an early season victory over eventual Ivy League champs Cornell who had possessed a 19-game Ivy League winning streak. The Ivy League does not name a coach of the year in any sport, but Collegeinsider.com named Johnson Ivy League Coach of the Year.

During Johnson's third season, the 2009–10 team rebounded from a 2–4 start to win 20 of its final 25 games and earn a berth in the 2010 College Basketball Invitational. Princeton's 22 wins were its most since 1999, as were its two postseason wins, and the postseason berth was its first since 2004. In the March 17, opening round game at home, Princeton defeated the Duquesne Dukes 65–51. The game was Princeton's first postseason appearance since the 2003–04 team went to the 2004 NCAA Division I men's basketball tournament and the first postseason victory since the 1998–99 team won two games in the 1999 National Invitation Tournament. On March 22, the team defeated IUPUI 74–68 in double overtime at IUPUI Gymnasium in Indianapolis, Indiana. The Tigers had previously won in the postseason in Indianapolis when the Johnson-led 1995–96 team pulled off a first round upset of the national defending champion UCLA in the 1996 Tournament. In the tournament semifinals the team was defeated by Saint Louis University 69–59 at Chaifetz Arena in St. Louis, Missouri on March 24. Johnson again earned Collegeinsider.com Coach of the Year.

In 2010, Johnson tweaked the motion Princeton offense to be a bit more uptempo, resulting in more possessions and higher scores. On March 5, 2010, the 2010–11 team had a chance to clinch an outright 2010–11 Ivy League men's basketball season championship, but lost to Harvard who clinched a share of the title. Following the game, Johnson made his team sit on the bench and watch the Harvard fans celebrate. On March 8, Princeton defeated Penn to force a one-game playoff at the Payne Whitney Gymnasium in New Haven, Connecticut. On March 12, Princeton earned the Ivy League's automatic bid to the 2011 NCAA Division I men's basketball tournament, making the NCAA Division I men's basketball tournament for the first time since 2004 and 24th time in school history by defeating Harvard 63–62. Princeton was awarded the number thirteen seed and a first round match against the Kentucky Wildcats. Kentucky had eliminated Ivy League representative Cornell the prior season. Kentucky emerged victorious by a 59–57 margin on a last second layup. He was named as a finalist for the Hugh Durham Award, the Ben Jobe Award, and the Skip Prosser Award.

=== Fairfield (2011–2019) ===
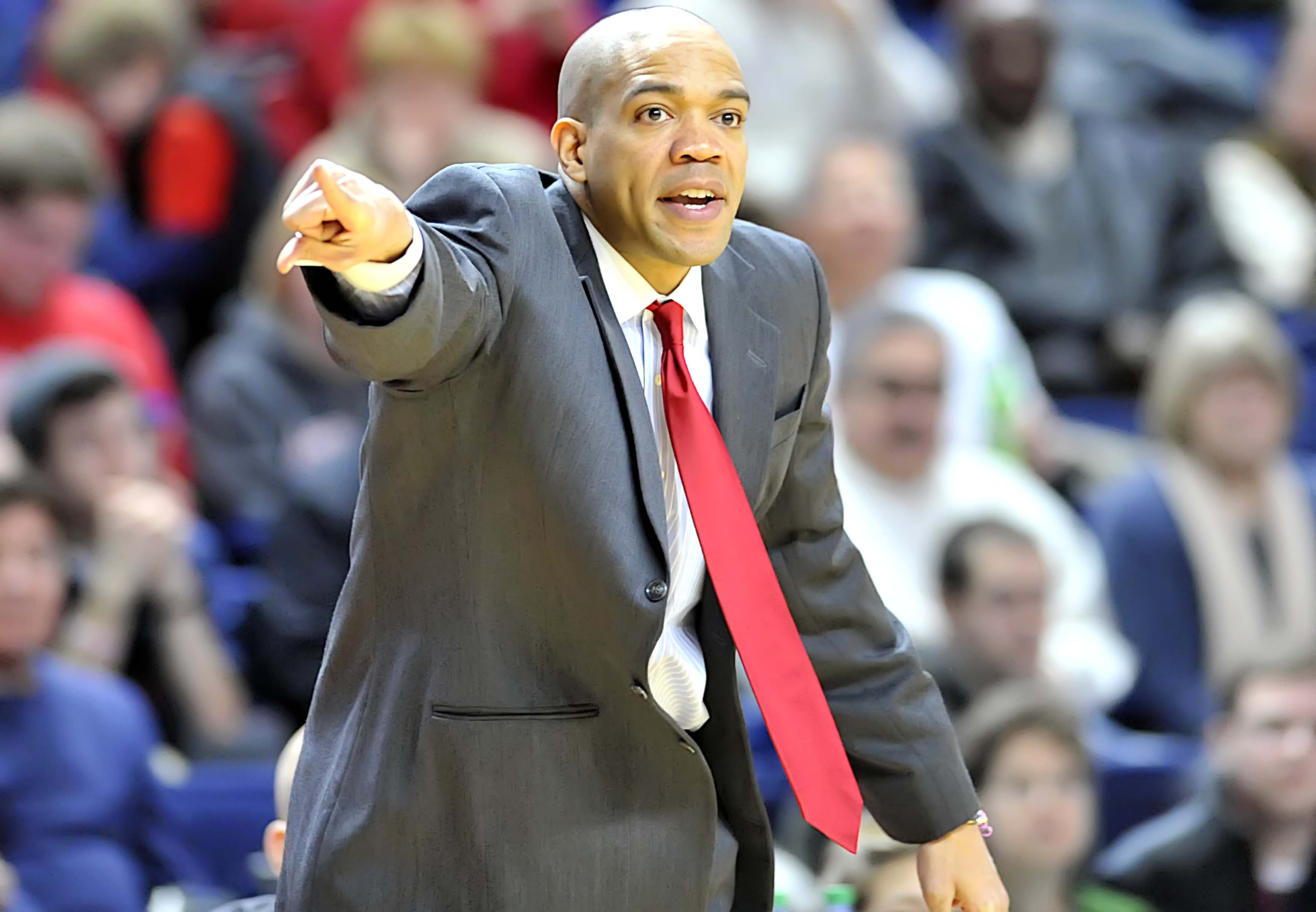
Johnson coaching for Fairfield in 2014

In April 2011, Johnson accepted a head coaching position at Fairfield University, replacing Ed Cooley. He coached the 2011–12 Stags to the semifinals of the 2012 CollegeInsider.com Postseason Tournament where they lost to Mercer, after defeating Yale, Manhattan and Robert Morris to finish with a 22–15 record. Mercer went on to win the tournament. For the second season in a row, he was a finalist for the Ben Jobe Award. The 2012–13 team started the season 10–10 (2–6) before winning five consecutive and seven out of eight Metro Atlantic Athletic Conference games. The team then lost its two final conference games to finish 9–9 in conference. Eventually the team finished 19–15 (9–9).

On March 11, 2019, Fairfield fired Johnson. He finished at Fairfield with an eight-year record of 116–147.

=== Air Force (2020–2021) ===
Johnson was named associate head coach on former Princeton basketball player Joe Scott's staff at Air Force for the 2020–21 season.

=== USA Basketball ===
Johnson served as a USA Basketball scout for the February 2020 FIBA AmeriCup Qualifying Team. He later served as head coach of the July 2023 3x3 Men's U23 Nations League Team and the gold medal winning 2023 FIBA 3x3 U23 World Cup team. Then he served as an assistant coach for the 2025 AmeriCup Qualifying Team in February 2024.

=== Chicago Sky (2024) ===
On February 26, 2024, Johnson was added to the staff of the Chicago Sky as an assistant on Teresa Weatherspoon's coaching staff.

=== Washington Mystics (2025–present) ===
On December 23, 2024, Johnson was named head coach of the Washington Mystics.

== Personal life ==
Johnson's history professor father, Leroy, divorced from his mother when Johnson was young. He grew up in a series of college towns. Johnson's father played basketball for Indiana in the late 1950s. He was also one of the first Americans to play professionally in France. His brother Stephen was on the California Bears team that defeated the two-time defending champion Duke Blue Devils men's basketball team in the 1993 NCAA tournament. While at Princeton, Johnson was a member of the Cap and Gown Club. Johnson met his wife Jennifer (née Zarr) Johnson when they were freshmen in Princeton's First College. When he was initially hired by Princeton the couple had two children: 2-year-old son, Jalen, and newborn daughter, Julia.

Johnson had been very involved with the university as a whole during his head coaching career, participating in a task force charged with surveying the impact of Princeton's eating clubs on campus life, and sitting with his players in the student section at many home football games.

== Head coaching record ==
=== College ===
Record table
Season	Team	Overall	Conference	Standing	Postseason
Princeton Tigers (Ivy League) (2007–2011)
2007–08	Princeton	6–23	3–11	T–6th	
2008–09	Princeton	13–14	8–6	T–2nd	
2009–10	Princeton	22–9	11–3	2nd	CBI semifinal
2010–11	Princeton	25–7	12–2	T–1st	NCAA Division I Round of 64
Princeton:		66–53 (.555)	34–22 (.555)		
Fairfield Stags (Metro Atlantic Athletic Conference) (2011–2019)
2011–12	Fairfield	22–15	12–6	T–3rd	CIT semifinal
2012–13	Fairfield	19–16	9–9	T–6th	
2013–14	Fairfield	7–25	4–16	10th	
2014–15	Fairfield	7–24	5–15	T–10th	
2015–16	Fairfield	19–14	12–8	T–4th	CIT first round
2016–17	Fairfield	16–15	11–9	5th	CIT first round
2017–18	Fairfield	17–16	9–9	T–5th	
2018–19	Fairfield	9–22	6–12	T–9th	
Fairfield:		116–147 (.441)	68–84 (.447)		
Total:		182–200 (.476)			
National champion Postseason invitational champion Conference regular season champion Conference regular season and conference tournament champion Division regular season champion Division regular season and conference tournament champion Conference tournament champion

=== WNBA ===
Legend
Regular season	G	Games coached	W	Games won	L	Games lost	W–L %	Win–loss %
Playoffs	PG	Playoff games	PW	Playoff wins	PL	Playoff losses	PW–L %	Playoff win–loss %

Team	Year	G	W	L	W–L%	Finish	PG	PW	PL	PW–L%	Result
WSH	2025	44	16	28	.364	4th in East	–	–	–	–	Missed Playoffs
Career		44	16	28	.364		–	–	–	–	
