= Franco Ciarrocca =

Argentine basketball player (born 2004)

Franco Luca Ciarrocca
Personal information
- Born: June 12, 2004 (age 22) Buenos Aires, Argentina
- Listed height: 6 ft 8 in (2.03 m)

Career information
- Playing career: 2018–present
- Position: Power forward / Small forward

Career history
- 2018–2021: Fomento Victoria
- 2021–2023: Alem
- 2023–2026: Obras Sanitarias

Franco Luca Ciarrocca (born June 12, 2004) is an Argentine professional basketball player for Obras Sanitarias of the Liga Nacional de Básquet (LNB), the top division of Argentine basketball. He also plays for the Argentine 3x3 team.

== Professional career ==
A versatile forward who plays as both a small forward and a power forward, Ciarrocca began his career at Club Social y de Fomento Victoria in Victoria, later spent time at Club Leandro N. Alem in Bahía Blanca, and currently plays for Obras Sanitarias.

== National team career ==
Ciarrocca competed internationally with the Argentina men's national 3x3 team at the 2026 FIBA 3x3 U23 World Cup, where the team finished in 11th place.
