= United States men's national under-23 3x3 team =

United States
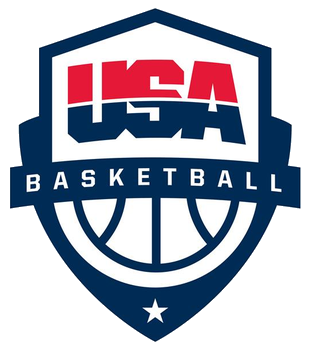
- FIBA zone: FIBA Americas
- National federation: USA Basketball

FIBA 3x3 U23 World Cup
- Appearances: 4
- Medals: Gold: (2023); Silver: (2024)
Medal record
FIBA 3x3 U23 World Cup
| Gold medal – first place | 2023 Lublin |
| Silver medal – second place | 2024 Ulaanbaatar |

The USA Men's under-23 3x3 Teams are two of the under-23 3x3 basketball teams under the auspices of the USA Basketball organization. In 2018, International Basketball Federation (FIBA) held the FIBA 3x3 U23 World Cup. It is an 3x3 under-23 basketball tournament held in every year for basketball players up to 23 years old. In 2020, it was not held due to COVID-19 pandemic.

In 2023 and 2024, the team competed in the final of the U23 World Cup. They won the first title in 2023 and came in second place in 2024.

== Tournament record ==
=== FIBA 3x3 U23 World Cup ===
| Year | Result | Position | Pld | W | L |
|---|---|---|---|---|---|
| (China) 2018 | Did not qualified | | | | |
| (China) 2019 | Preliminary round | 17th | 4 | 0 | 4 |
| (Romania) 2022 | Did not qualified | | | | |
| (Poland) 2023 | Champions | 1st | 7 | 7 | 0 |
| (Mongolia) 2024 | Runners-up | 2nd | 7 | 6 | 1 |
| (China) 2025 | Preliminary round | 11th | 4 | 2 | 2 |
| (China) 2026 | Quarter-final | 8th | 5 | 2 | 3 |
| Total | 1 Title | 5/7 | 27 | 17 | 10 |
