= 2024 FIBA 3x3 U23 World Cup – Men's tournament =

International basketball competition in Mongolia

Tournament details
- Host country: Mongolia
- City: Ulaanbaatar
- Dates: 11–15 September
- Teams: 20

Final positions
- Champions: Germany (1st title)
- Runners-up: United States
- Third place: Spain
- Fourth place: Lithuania

Tournament statistics
- MVP: (Germany) Fabian Giessmann

The 2024 FIBA 3x3 U23 World Cup – Men's tournament is the 5th edition of this championship. The event was held in Ulaanbaatar, Mongolia. It was contested by 20 teams. United States are the defending champions.

Germany won their first title with a win against United States in the final.

== Host selection ==
During the 2022 FIBA 3x3 World Cup in Antwerp, FIBA signed an agreement with the Mongolian Basketball Association to host future 3x3 events in 2023 and 2024; including the 2024 FIBA U23 World Cup.

== Teams ==
Africa

- Egypt
- Algeria
- Benin
- Kenya

Americas

- Argentina
- Chile
- United States

Asia and Oceania

- China
- Mongolia (hosts)
- Japan
- New Zealand

Europe

- France
- Spain
- Ukraine
- Netherlands
- Germany
- Israel
- Italy
- Lithuania
- Latvia

== Seeding ==
The seeding and groups were as follows:

| Pool A | Pool B | Pool C | Pool D |
|---|---|---|---|
| France (1); Egypt (8); Spain (9); Ukraine (16); Algeria (17) | China (2); Netherlands (7); Mongolia (10) (H); Japan (15); Benin (18) | Germany (3); Israel (6); Italy (11); New Zealand (14); Argentina (19) | Lithuania (4); Latvia (5); Chile (12); United States (13); Kenya (20) |

== Venue ==
The venue was at the Sükhbaatar Square in Ulaanbaatar.

== Preliminary round ==
=== Pool A ===
| Pos | Team | Pld | W | L | PF | PA | PD | Qualification | (Spain) | (France) | (Algeria) | (Ukraine) | (Egypt) |
|---|---|---|---|---|---|---|---|---|---|---|---|---|---|
| 1 | Spain | 4 | 4 | 0 | 76 | 44 | +32 | Quarterfinals | | 18–9 | | 16–8 | |
| 2 | France | 4 | 3 | 1 | 60 | 54 | +6 | Quarterfinals | | | | 17–15 | 21–10 |
| 3 | Algeria | 4 | 2 | 2 | 68 | 70 | −2 | | 15–21 | 11–13 | | | |
| 4 | Ukraine | 4 | 1 | 3 | 62 | 70 | −8 | | | | 18–21 | | 21–16 |
| 5 | Egypt | 4 | 0 | 4 | 56 | 84 | −28 | | 12–21 | | 18–21 | | |

Source: FIBA
Rules for classification: 1) Wins; 2) Head-to-head record; 3) Points scored.

=== Pool B ===
| Pos | Team | Pld | W | L | PF | PA | PD | Qualification | (Japan) | (China) | (Netherlands) | (Mongolia) | (Benin) |
|---|---|---|---|---|---|---|---|---|---|---|---|---|---|
| 1 | Japan | 4 | 3 | 1 | 76 | 63 | +13 | Quarterfinals | | | 21–10 | | 21–14 |
| 2 | China | 4 | 3 | 1 | 75 | 64 | +11 | Quarterfinals | 21–13 | | 16–21 | | |
| 3 | Netherlands | 4 | 3 | 1 | 66 | 58 | +8 | | | | | 14–11 | 21–10 |
| 4 | Mongolia (H) | 4 | 1 | 3 | 66 | 68 | −2 | | 18–21 | 16–21 | | | |
| 5 | Benin | 4 | 0 | 4 | 50 | 80 | −30 | | | 14–17 | | 12–21 | |

Source: FIBA
Rules for classification: 1) Wins; 2) Head-to-head record; 3) Points scored.
(H) Hosts

=== Pool C ===
| Pos | Team | Pld | W | L | PF | PA | PD | Qualification | (Germany) | (New Zealand) | (Argentina) | (Israel) | (Italy) |
|---|---|---|---|---|---|---|---|---|---|---|---|---|---|
| 1 | Germany | 4 | 4 | 0 | 82 | 57 | +25 | Quarterfinals | | 21–11 | | 21–10 | |
| 2 | New Zealand | 4 | 3 | 1 | 74 | 62 | +12 | Quarterfinals | | | 22–12 | 20–17 | |
| 3 | Argentina | 4 | 2 | 2 | 69 | 67 | +2 | | 15–18 | | | | 21–10 |
| 4 | Israel | 4 | 1 | 3 | 60 | 75 | −15 | | | | 17–21 | | 16–13 |
| 5 | Italy | 4 | 0 | 4 | 56 | 80 | −24 | | 21–22 OT | 12–21 | | | |

Source: FIBA
Rules for classification: 1) Wins; 2) Head-to-head record; 3) Points scored.

=== Pool D ===
| Pos | Team | Pld | W | L | PF | PA | PD | Qualification | (United States) | (Lithuania) | (Latvia) | (Kenya) | (Chile) |
|---|---|---|---|---|---|---|---|---|---|---|---|---|---|
| 1 | United States | 4 | 4 | 0 | 84 | 38 | +46 | Quarterfinals | | | 22–5 | 21–10 | |
| 2 | Lithuania | 4 | 3 | 1 | 75 | 66 | +9 | Quarterfinals | 13–21 | | 21–19 | | |
| 3 | Latvia | 4 | 2 | 2 | 63 | 69 | −6 | | | | | 21–12 | 18–14 |
| 4 | Kenya | 4 | 1 | 3 | 53 | 73 | −20 | | | 15–20 | | | 16–11 |
| 5 | Chile | 4 | 0 | 4 | 46 | 75 | −29 | | 10–20 | 11–21 | | | |

Source: FIBA
Rules for classification: 1) Wins; 2) Head-to-head record; 3) Points scored.

== Knockout stage ==
All times are local.

Quarter-finals
15 September 12:50
Spain | 20
New Zealand | 12
15 September 13:15
United States | 21
China | 11
15 September 14:40
Germany | 20
France | 15
15 September 15:05
Japan | 17
Lithuania | 21

Semi-finals
15 September 16:30
Spain | 19
United States | 21
15 September 16:55
Germany | 21
Lithuania | 14

Final
15 September 18:45
United States | 13
Germany | 21
Bronze medal
15 September 17:55
Spain | 21
Lithuania | 16

== Final standings ==
=== Tiebreakers ===
- 1) Wins
- 2) Points scored
- 3) Seeding

| Pos | Team | Pld | W | L | W% | PF | PA |
|---|---|---|---|---|---|---|---|
| 1 | Germany | 7 | 7 | 0 | 100% | 20.4 | 143 |
| 2 | United States | 7 | 6 | 1 | 86% | 19.7 | 138 |
| 3 | Spain | 7 | 6 | 1 | 86% | 19.4 | 136 |
| 4 | Lithuania | 7 | 4 | 3 | 57% | 18.0 | 126 |
| 5 | Japan | 5 | 3 | 2 | 60% | 18.6 | 93 |
| 6 | China | 5 | 3 | 2 | 60% | 17.2 | 86 |
| 7 | New Zealand | 5 | 3 | 2 | 60% | 17.0 | 85 |
| 8 | France | 5 | 3 | 2 | 60% | 15.0 | 75 |
| 9 | Netherlands | 4 | 3 | 1 | 75% | 16.5 | 66 |
| 10 | Argentina | 4 | 2 | 2 | 50% | 17.3 | 69 |
| 11 | Algeria | 4 | 2 | 2 | 50% | 17.0 | 68 |
| 12 | Latvia | 4 | 2 | 2 | 50% | 15.8 | 63 |
| 13 | Mongolia | 4 | 1 | 3 | 25% | 16.5 | 66 |
| 14 | Ukraine | 4 | 1 | 3 | 25% | 15.5 | 62 |
| 15 | Israel | 4 | 1 | 3 | 25% | 15.0 | 60 |
| 16 | Kenya | 4 | 1 | 3 | 25% | 13.3 | 53 |
| 17 | Egypt | 4 | 0 | 4 | 25% | 14.0 | 56 |
| 18 | Italy | 4 | 0 | 4 | 0% | 14.0 | 56 |
| 19 | Benin | 4 | 0 | 4 | 0% | 12.5 | 50 |
| 20 | Chile | 4 | 0 | 4 | 0% | 11.5 | 46 |

== Awards ==
Team of the tournament
| (Germany) Fabian Giessmann | (United States) Jameer Lamar Nelson Jr | (Spain) Isaac Mayo |
Most valuable player
(Germany) Fabian Giessmann
Top scorer
(Germany) Fabian Giessmann (72 points)
