= 2019 FIBA 3x3 U23 World Cup – Men's tournament =

Tournament details
- Host country: China
- City: Lanzhou
- Dates: 2–6 October
- Teams: 20

Final positions
- Champions: Russia (2nd title)
- Runners-up: Ukraine
- Third place: Serbia
- Fourth place: Netherlands

Tournament statistics
- MVP: (Russia) Alexander Zuev

The 2019 FIBA 3x3 U23 World Cup – Men's tournament is the second edition of this championship. The event was held in Lanzhou, China. It was contested by 20 teams. Russia are the defending champions.

Russia won their second title with a win against Ukraine in the final.

== Host selection ==
Chinese city, Lanzhou, was given the hosting rights on 17 July 2018. Although 2018 host city, Xi'an, originally planned to host it.

== Teams ==
FIBA announced the qualified teams on 19 December 2018.

Africa

- None

Americas

- Argentina
- Brazil
- United States

Asia and Oceania

- China (hosts)
- Kazakhstan
- Kyrgyzstan
- Mongolia
- New Zealand
- Qatar
- South Korea

Europe

- Italy
- Latvia
- Lithuania
- Netherlands
- Romania
- Russia
- Serbia
- Slovenia
- Turkey
- Ukraine

== Seeding ==
The pools were announced on 19 December 2018.

The seeding and groups were as follows:

Pool A	Pool B	Pool C	Pool D
Russia (1); Slovenia (8); Turkey (9); Argentina (16); New Zealand (17)	China (2) (H); Romania (7); Latvia (10); Kazakhstan (15); United States (18)	Qatar (3); Ukraine (6); Brazil (11); Italy (14); Kyrgyzstan (19)	Mongolia (4); Netherlands (5); Lithuania (12); Serbia (13); South Korea (20)

== Preliminary round ==
=== Pool A ===
Pos	Team	Pld	W	L	PF	PA	PD	Qualification	(Russia)	(Argentina)	(New Zealand)	(Slovenia)	(Turkey)
1	Russia	4	4	0	85	41	+44	Quarterfinals		21–13		21–9	
2	Argentina	4	3	1	71	70	+1	Quarterfinals			18–17 OT	19–16	
3	New Zealand	4	2	2	73	71	+2		14–22				21–12
4	Slovenia	4	1	3	66	79	−13				19–21		22–18
5	Turkey	4	0	4	51	85	−34		5–21	16–21			

Source: FIBA
Rules for classification: 1) Wins; 2) Head-to-head record; 3) Points scored.

=== Pool B ===
Pos	Team	Pld	W	L	PF	PA	PD	Qualification	(China)	(Latvia)	(Romania)	(Kazakhstan)	(United States)
1	China (H)	4	4	0	83	52	+31	Quarterfinals			21–16	21–9	
2	Latvia	4	3	1	69	61	+8	Quarterfinals	12–20			21–15	
3	Romania	4	2	2	70	70	0			12–15			21–18
4	Kazakhstan	4	1	3	61	81	−20				16–21		21–18
5	United States	4	0	4	65	84	−19		15–21	14–21			

Source: FIBA
Rules for classification: 1) Wins; 2) Head-to-head record; 3) Points scored.
(H) Hosts

=== Pool C ===
Pos	Team	Pld	W	L	PF	PA	PD	Qualification	(Ukraine)	(Italy)	(Brazil)	(Qatar)	(Kyrgyzstan)
1	Ukraine	4	3	1	74	59	+15	Quarterfinals			20–16		21–9
2	Italy	4	3	1	73	52	+21	Quarterfinals	21–18				22–4
3	Brazil	4	3	1	68	62	+6			16–13		16–15 OT	
4	Qatar	4	1	3	63	57	+6		13–15	14–17			
5	Kyrgyzstan	4	0	4	36	84	−48				14–20	9–21	

Source: FIBA
Rules for classification: 1) Wins; 2) Head-to-head record; 3) Points scored.

=== Pool D ===
Pos	Team	Pld	W	L	PF	PA	PD	Qualification	(Serbia)	(Netherlands)	(Mongolia)	(Lithuania)	(South Korea)
1	Serbia	4	4	0	72	48	+24	Quarterfinals		15–13			17–5
2	Netherlands	4	3	1	75	60	+15	Quarterfinals				21–12	21–16
3	Mongolia	4	2	2	78	80	−2		18–21	17–20			
4	Lithuania	4	1	3	61	78	−17		12–19		19–21 OT		
5	South Korea	4	0	4	58	78	−20				20–22	17–18	

Source: FIBA
Rules for classification: 1) Wins; 2) Head-to-head record; 3) Points scored.

== Knockout stage ==
All times are local.

Quarter-finals
6 October – 13:00
Russia	18 OT
Italy	16
6 October – 13:25
Serbia	21
Latvia	9
6 October – 15:10
China	17
Netherlands	21
6 October – 15:35
Ukraine	18
Argentina	14

Semi-finals
6 October – 17:20
Russia	21
Serbia	17
6 October – 17:45
Netherlands	9
Ukraine	19

Final
6 October – 20:05
Russia	21
Ukraine	11
Bronze medal
6 October – 18:45
Serbia	21
Netherlands	13

== Final standings ==
=== Tiebreakers ===
- 1) Wins
- 2) Points scored
- 3) Seeding

Pos	Team	Pld	W	L	W%	PF	PA
1	Russia	7	7	0	100%	145	20.7
2	Ukraine	7	5	2	71%	122	17.4
3	Serbia	7	6	1	86%	131	18.7
4	Netherlands	7	4	3	57%	118	16.9
5	China	5	4	1	80%	100	20.0
6	Italy	5	3	2	60%	89	17.8
7	Argentina	5	3	2	60%	85	17.0
8	Latvia	5	3	2	60%	78	15.6
9	Brazil	4	3	1	75%	68	17.0
10	Mongolia	4	2	2	50%	78	19.5
11	New Zealand	4	2	2	50%	73	18.3
12	Romania	4	2	2	50%	70	17.5
13	Slovenia	4	1	3	25%	66	16.5
14	Qatar	4	1	3	25%	63	15.8
15	Lithuania	4	1	3	25%	61	15.3
16	Kazakhstan	4	1	3	25%	61	15.3
17	United States	4	0	4	0%	65	16.3
18	South Korea	4	0	4	0%	58	14.5
19	Turkey	4	0	4	0%	51	12.8
20	Kyrgyzstan	4	0	4	0%	38	9.0

== Awards ==
These players were given the awards after the competition:

=== Most valuable player ===
- (Russia) Alexander Zuev

=== Top scorer ===
- (Netherlands) Dylan Van Eyck (53 points)

=== Team of the tournament ===
- (Russia) Alexander Zuev
- (Serbia) Vladimir Trajkovic
- (Netherlands) Dylan Van Eyck

== See also ==
- 2019 FIBA 3x3 World Cup – Men's tournament
- 2019 FIBA 3x3 World Cup – Women's tournament
- 2019 FIBA 3x3 U23 World Cup – Women's tournament
- 2019 FIBA 3x3 Asia Cup
- 2019 FIBA 3x3 Africa Cup
- 2019 FIBA 3x3 Europe Cup
