= 2025 FIBA 3x3 U23 World Cup – Men's tournament =

International basketball competition in China

Tournament details
- Host country: China
- City: Xiong'an
- Dates: 17–21 September
- Teams: 20

Final positions
- Champions: Lithuania (1st title)
- Runners-up: Serbia
- Third place: Czech Republic
- Fourth place: Croatia

Tournament statistics
- MVP: (Lithuania) Rokas Jocys

The 2025 FIBA 3x3 U23 World Cup – Men's tournament was the 6th edition of this championship. The event was held in Xiong'an, China. It was contested by 20 teams. Germany are the defending champions.

Lithuania won their first title with a win against Serbia in the final.

== Teams ==
Africa

- Algeria
- Egypt

Americas

- Argentina
- United States
- Venezuela

Asia and Oceania

- China (hosts)
- Fiji
- Iran
- Mongolia
- New Zealand
- Qatar

Europe

- Croatia
- Czech Republic
- France
- Germany
- Italy
- Latvia
- Lithuania
- Poland
- Serbia

== Seeding ==
The seeding and groups were as follows:

Pool A	Pool B	Pool C	Pool D
Germany (1); Lithuania (8); Poland (9); Croatia (16); Iran (17)	France (2); New Zealand (7); Czech Republic (10); Serbia (15); Egypt (18)	Mongolia (3); Italy (6); Algeria (11); Argentina (14); Venezuela (19)	China (4) (H); Latvia (5); United States (12); Qatar (13); Fiji (20)

== Venue ==
The venue was at the Xiong'an Country Park in Xiong'an.

== Preliminary round ==
=== Pool A ===
Pos	Team	Pld	W	L	PF	PA	PD	Qualification	(Croatia)	(Lithuania)	(Germany)	(Poland)	(Iran)
1	Croatia	4	4	0	67	56	+11	Quarterfinals		18–17			21–16
2	Lithuania	4	2	2	66	68	−2	Quarterfinals				17–21	17–15
3	Germany	4	2	2	63	49	+14		13–15	14–15			
4	Poland	4	2	2	61	71	−10		10–13		9–21		
5	Iran	4	0	4	61	74	−13				10–15	20–21	

Source: FIBA
Rules for classification: 1) Wins; 2) Head-to-head record; 3) Points scored.

=== Pool B ===
Pos	Team	Pld	W	L	PF	PA	PD	Qualification	(Czech Republic)	(Serbia)	(New Zealand)	(France)	(Egypt)
1	Czech Republic	4	3	1	67	59	+8	Quarterfinals		18–16 OT		17–13	
2	Serbia	4	3	1	79	55	+24	Quarterfinals			21–20		21–8
3	New Zealand	4	2	2	74	70	+4		15–18				21–14
4	France	4	1	3	58	74	−16			9–21	17–18 OT		
5	Egypt	4	1	3	55	75	−20		14–15			18–19 OT	

Source: FIBA
Rules for classification: 1) Wins; 2) Head-to-head record; 3) Points scored.

=== Pool C ===
Pos	Team	Pld	W	L	PF	PA	PD	Qualification	(Argentina)	(Italy)	(Mongolia)	(Algeria)	(Venezuela)
1	Argentina	4	3	1	82	72	+10	Quarterfinals		19–21			21–16
2	Italy	4	3	1	79	60	+19	Quarterfinals				21–14	21–7
3	Mongolia	4	3	1	78	67	+11		19–21	20–16			
4	Algeria	4	1	3	66	83	−17		16–21		15–21		
5	Venezuela	4	0	4	58	81	−23				15–18	20–21	

Source: FIBA
Rules for classification: 1) Wins; 2) Head-to-head record; 3) Points scored.

=== Pool D ===
Pos	Team	Pld	W	L	PF	PA	PD	Qualification	(Latvia)	(China)	(United States)	(Qatar)	(Fiji)
1	Latvia	4	4	0	78	57	+21	Quarterfinals			15–14 OT		21–14
2	China (H)	4	3	1	81	66	+15	Quarterfinals	18–21			21–18	
3	United States	4	2	2	74	59	+15			18–21		21–15	
4	Qatar	4	1	3	61	78	−17		11–21				17–15 OT
5	Fiji	4	0	4	46	80	−34			9–21	8–21		

Source: FIBA
Rules for classification: 1) Wins; 2) Head-to-head record; 3) Points scored.
(H) Hosts

== Knockout stage ==
All times are local.

Quarter-finals
21 September 14:10
Croatia	20 (OT)
Italy	18
21 September 14:35
Latvia	10
Serbia	21
21 September 16:40
Czech Republic	19
China	15
21 September 16:25
Argentina	19
Lithuania	21

Semi-finals
21 September 18:40
Croatia	10
Serbia	17
21 September 19:05
Czech Republic	10
Lithuania	19

Final
21 September 20:05
Serbia	14
Lithuania	19
Bronze medal
21 September 20:55
Croatia	15
Czech Republic	17 (OT)

== Final standings ==
=== Tiebreakers ===
- 1) Wins
- 2) Points scored
- 3) Seeding

Pos	Team	Pld	W	L	W%	PA	PF
1	Lithuania	7	5	2	71%	17.9	125
2	Serbia	7	5	2	71%	18.7	131
3	Czech Republic	7	5	2	71%	16.1	113
4	Croatia	7	5	2	71%	16.0	112
5	Latvia	5	4	1	80%	17.6	88
6	Argentina	5	3	2	60%	20.2	101
7	Italy	5	3	2	60%	19.4	97
8	China	5	3	2	60%	19.2	96
9	Mongolia	4	3	1	75%	19.5	78
10	New Zealand	4	2	2	50%	18.5	74
11	United States	4	2	2	50%	18.5	74
12	Germany	4	2	2	50%	15.8	63
13	Poland	4	2	2	50%	15.3	61
14	Algeria	4	1	3	25%	16.5	66
15	Qatar	4	1	3	25%	15.3	61
16	France	4	1	3	25%	14.5	58
17	Egypt	4	1	3	25%	13.8	55
18	Iran	4	0	4	0%	15.3	61
19	Venezuela	4	0	4	0%	14.5	58
20	Fiji	4	0	4	0%	11.5	46

== Awards ==
Team of the tournament
(Lithuania) Rokas Jocys	(Serbia) Vuk Vukićević	(Czech Republic) Vojtěch Hajič
Most valuable player
(Lithuania) Rokas Jocys
Top scorer
(Serbia) Vuk Vukićević (54 points)
