= 2023 FIBA 3x3 U18 World Cup =

The 2023 FIBA 3x3 U18 World Cup consists of two sections:

- 2023 FIBA 3x3 U18 World Cup – Men's tournament
- 2023 FIBA 3x3 U18 World Cup – Women's tournament
