= Luca Ciarrocca =

Italian writer

Luca Ciarrocca is an Italian Internet entrepreneur, journalist and author of macroeconomic and geopolical books. He has spent years analyzing the dynamics and imbalances of global power. His most recent book is "L'anima nera della Silicon Valley. La vera storia di Peter Thiel". Formerly a New York correspondent for Indro Montanelli’s Il Giornale, in 1999 he founded and directed Wall Street Italia, at the time one of the first independent websites on economics and finance. He is the author of several investigative books, including the long seller "I padroni del mondo" (2013) , L’affaire Soros (2019), and Terza Guerra Mondiale (2022). He writes about international politics for Domani and Il Fatto Quotidiano. He has won the journalistic awards Premiolino and Amerigo.

== Biography ==
He was born in Rome, and completed his professional education with a degree in Law at the Università La Sapienza, Rome, followed by a Master in Business Administration, with a specialty in Finance, from the SAA (Scuola di Amministrazione Aziendale) in Turin.

== Career ==
Luca Ciarrocca chose financial journalism as his career path and landed a post-MBA internship at Mondo Economico, the weekly magazine of Il Sole 24 Ore, his first full-time job. He became a licensed journalist and was appointed senior editor of Il Mondo, a business and political magazine within the RCS-Corriere della Sera Group. Later he was selected to become a correspondent in New York and moved to the US. In New York, over the course of many years, he worked for several major Italian media outlets, including Il Giornale, ANSA and L'Espresso. He has also written for La Repubblica, Milano Finanza and The Street. He regularly appears as a financial, economic and political pundit on Italian television and radio programs, like RAI, Mediaset, SkyNews, La7 and other media.

=== Online Financial News ===
Ciarrocca came up with the idea for Wall Street Italia in New York during the summer of 1999 and the website was launched on 11 October, during the golden season of the "new economy". The offices were on the 73rd floor of the Empire State Building in Manhattan. For a few years about 30% of Wall Street Italia shares were owned by HdpNet, the Internet holding company that belonged to the leading Italian publishing group RCS-Corriere della Sera. Following the withdrawal of Corriere della Sera from the business, as chief executive officer and editor-in-chief, Ciarrocca practised an unbiased and aggressive approach in the world of online business news. Traffic on the website grew during the years 2008–2011, along with financial crisis. Later more space was given to geopolitics and macroeconomy. On the morning of September 11, 2001, Luca Ciarrocca was the first in the world to give news of the al-Qaeda terrorist attack on the World Trade Center towers. Ciarrocca sold Wall Street Italia in October 2014 to an internet media company listed on the Milan Stock Exchange, choosing to remain independent and to pursue a career as macroeconomic and foreign policy author.

== Awards ==
In 1997 he was awarded the Premiolino prize, the oldest and one of the most respected Italian journalistic awards, nominated by ANSA for "having beaten the powerful American news agencies on their own turf". In 2016 Ciarrocca was among the winners of 8th Amerigo/ENAM Journalism Award in the Websites section.

== Published work ==
His latest book, "L'anima nera della Silicon Valley: La vera storia di Peter Thiel (2026)", is Europe’s first biography of the powerful Palantir founder, who has transformed data and surveillance into the strategic infrastructure of the modern era. In May 2022 he published "Terza Guerra Mondiale", an investigative essay on nuclear rearmament. Drafted before the invasion of Ukraine, it is the first analysis, based on intelligence sources, of the geopolitical risks of a Russia-NATO war fought in Europe. "L'affaire Soros" (Chiarelettere, 2019) a biography of the billionaire philanthropist that has been targeted by conspiracy theories. In July 2018 Ciarrocca published "Intervista sulla Cina – Come convivere con la superpotenza globale del futuro" (Gangemi Editore), an economic and geopolitical analysis of the Asian superpower's ambitions and its growing strength in dealing with the United States, Russia and Europe. "Rimetti a noi i nostri debiti" (Guerini) (Forgive Us Our Debt) is a 2015 essay on public debt which proposes a "QE For The People": a new form of quantitative easing whereby central banks would give "helicopter money" directly to taxpayers rather than to commercial banks. "I padroni del mondo" is a 2013 bestseller focused on fixing the dysfunctional global banking system. Ciarrocca's first book was in 2001 "Investire in tempo di guerra" (Investing in Times of War), Edizioni Nutrimenti.
