= Philippines at the FIBA 3x3 World Tour =

Philippines
- FIBA 3x3 World Tour participation
- Flag of the Philippines

Final tournament results
- Appearance: 2 (2014, 2015)
- Best: 5th (2014, Manila West)
- Teams: 2 (Manila West, Manila North)

The Philippines was represented at the FIBA 3x3 World Tour Finals two times, debuting in 2014. So far the teams that represented the country are based in Metro Manila; Manila West and Manila North.

Two Masters tournaments (in 2014 and 2015) were hosted in the Philippines, both of which were hosted within Metro Manila.

The country will host two Masters tournament in 2022; one in Metro Manila and another in Cebu.

== Teams ==
The Philippines had two teams in the mid-2010s, Manila West and Manila North which appeared in the 2014 and 2015 World Tour Finals. No other team to qualified for the World Tour Finals.

Chooks-to-Go would enter the scene and sent multiple teams under its name in the 3x3 pro-circuit.

Two PBA 3x3 teams has also played in the 3x3 pro-circuit namely: TNT Triple Giga (Pasig) and Wilcon Depot (later became Lubao MCFASolver Tech Centrale)

== FIBA 3x3 World Tour ==
=== Finals rosters ===
Tournament	Team	Players	Coach	Honors
2014 Sendai	Manila West	Niño Canaleta; Rey Guevarra; Aldrech Ramos; Terrence Romeo	Eric Altamirano	(gold) 1st – (Philippines) Manila Masters
2015 Abu Dhabi	Manila North	Calvin Abueva; Karl Dehesa; Vic Manuel; Troy Rosario	—	(silver) 2nd – (Philippines) Manila Masters

=== Finals record ===
Team	(United States) 2012	(Turkey) 2013	(Japan) 2014	(United Arab Emirates) 2015	(United Arab Emirates) 2016	(China) 2017	(China) 2018	(Japan) 2019	(Saudi Arabia) 2020	(Saudi Arabia) 2021	(United Arab Emirates) 2022	(Saudi Arabia) 2023
Manila West	—	—	5th	DNQ	—	—	—	—	—	—	—	—
Manila North	—	—	DNQ	6th	—	—	—	—	—	—	—	—
Manila Chooks	—	—	—	—	—	—	—	—	DNQ	DNQ	DNQ	TBD
Balanga Chooks	—	—	—	—	—	—	—	DNQ	—	—	—	—
Cebu Chooks	—	—	—	—	—	—	—	—	—	—	DNQ	—
Isabela City Chooks	—	—	—	—	—	—	—	DNQ	—	—	—	—
Pasig Chooks	—	—	—	—	—	—	—	DNQ	—	—	—	—
Pasig TNT	—	—	—	—	—	—	—	—	—	—	—	TBD
Lubao MCFASolver–Pampanga	—	—	—	—	—	—	—	—	—	—	—	TBD
Wilcon Depot 3x3	—	—	—	—	—	—	—	—	—	—	—	DNQ

== FIBA 3x3 All-Stars ==
=== Rosters ===
Tournament	Team	Players	Coach	Honors
2016 Doha	Manila	Bright Akhuetie; Rey Guevarra; Sidney Onwubere; CJ Perez	—	

== See also ==
- Philippines men's national 3x3 team
