= Canada at the FIBA 3x3 World Tour =

Canada
- FIBA 3x3 World Tour participation
- Flag of Canada

Final tournament results
- Appearance: 3 (2012, 2013, 2014)
- Best: (silver) (2014, Saskatoon)
- Teams: 2 (Edmonton, Saskatoon)

Canada was represented at the FIBA 3x3 World Tour Finals three times, debuting in the inaugural tournament in 2012. So far the teams that represented the country were Edmonton and Saskatoon.

== Finals rosters ==
Tournament	Team	Players	Honors
2012 Miami	Edmonton	Jordan Baker; Dominyck Coward; Joel Friesen; Jarred Ogungbemi Jackson	(bronze) 3rd – (United States) World Tour Final (bronze) 3rd – (United States) New York Masters
2013 Istanbul	Saskatoon	Michael Linklater (USA); Michael Lieffers; Troy Gottselig; Trevor Nerdahl	(silver) 2nd – (Puerto Rico) San Juan Masters
2014 Sendai	Saskatoon	Willie Murdaugh (USA); Michael Linklater (USA); O'Neil Gordon; Michael Lieffers	(silver) 2nd – (United States) World Tour Final; (gold) 1st – (United States) Chicago Masters

== Finals record ==
Team	(United States) 2012	(Turkey) 2013	(Japan) 2014	(United Arab Emirates) 2015
Edmonton	3rd			
Saskatoon		6th	2nd	
