= 2017 FIBA 3x3 World Tour – Prague Masters =

The 2017 FIBA 3x3 World Tour Prague Masters was a 3x3 basketball tournament held in Prague, Czech Republic at a temporary venue constructed at the Wenceslas Square from August 5–6, 2017. This was the third stop on the 2017 FIBA 3x3 World Tour.

== Participants ==
12 teams qualified to participate at the Prague Masters.

Event	Date	Location	Berths	Qualified
Odense 3x3 Challenger 2017	June 10–11, 2017	(Denmark) Odense	2	(Bosnia and Herzegovina) Team Vitez (Poland) Team Kołobrzeg
3x3 Urban Legends Final	June 25, 2017	(Greece) Athens	1	(Greece) Team Don Poly, known at the tournament as Team Athens
Chance 3x3 Tour 2017 - Praha "Finále"	June 25, 2017	(Czech Republic) Prague	1	(Czech Republic) Team Bo!, known in the tournament as Team Ostrava
Decathlon B33 Tour 2017 Final	July 2, 2017	(Hungary) Budapest	1	(Croatia) Team General Vsilije M, known at the tournament as Team Zagreb
Road To Prague Final Stage	July 4–5, 2017	(Lebanon) Beirut	1	(Slovenia) Team Ljubljana
Sibiu 3x3 Challenger 2017	July 15–16, 2017	(Romania) Sibiu	2	(Serbia) Team Belgrade (Serbia) Team Zemun
3x3 Quest 2017 - Final - Poznań	July 22–23, 2017	(Poland) Poznań	1	(Poland) Team R8 Basket 3x3 Kraków known at the tournament as Team Kraków R8 Basket
Hard Seeded Qualifiers	N/A	N/A	2	(United Arab Emirates) Team Novi Sad Al-Wahda (Canada) Team Saskatoon
Wildcard Qualifier	N/A	N/A	1	(Czech Republic) Team Humpolec
TOTAL			12	

== Preliminary round ==
=== Pool A ===
Qualified for Quarterfinals

Team	Pld	W	L	PF	PA	PD	Pts
(United Arab Emirates) Novi Sad Al-Wahda	2	2	0	43	28	+15	4
(Czech Republic) Humpolec	2	1	1	33	38	−5	3
(Croatia) Zagreb	2	0	2	32	42	−10	2

August 5, 2017
Novi Sad Al-Wahda (United Arab Emirates)	21–16	(Croatia) Zagreb
Humpolec (Czech Republic)	21–16	(Croatia) Zagreb
Novi Sad Al-Wahda (United Arab Emirates)	22–12	(Czech Republic) Humpolec

=== Pool B ===
Qualified for Quarterfinals

Team	Pld	W	L	PF	PA	PD	Pts
(Slovenia) Ljubljana	2	1	1	39	37	+2	3
(Bosnia and Herzegovina) Vitez	2	1	1	38	36	+2	3
(Czech Republic) Ostrava	2	1	1	34	38	−4	3

August 5, 2017
Ljubljana (Slovenia)	18–19	(Czech Republic) Ostrava
Vitez (Bosnia and Herzegovina)	20–15	(Czech Republic) Ostrava
Ljubljana (Slovenia)	21–18	(Bosnia and Herzegovina) Vitez

=== Pool C ===
Qualified for Quarterfinals

Team	Pld	W	L	PF	PA	PD	Pts
(Canada) Saskatoon	2	2	0	43	31	+12	4
(Serbia) Belgrade	2	1	1	39	37	+2	3
(Poland) Kołobrzeg	2	0	2	29	43	−14	2

August 5, 2017
Saskatoon (Canada)	22–13	(Poland) Kołobrzeg
Belgrade (Serbia)	21–16	(Poland) Kołobrzeg
Saskatoon (Canada)	21–18	(Serbia) Belgrade

=== Pool D ===
Qualified for Quarterfinals

Team	Pld	W	L	PF	PA	PD	Pts
(Serbia) Zemun	2	2	0	37	31	+6	4
(Poland) Kraków	2	1	1	38	29	+9	3
(Greece) Athens	2	0	2	25	40	−15	2

August 5, 2017
Zemun (Serbia)	19-14	(Greece) Athens
Kraków (Poland)	21–11	(Greece) Athens
Zemun (Serbia)	18–17	(Poland) Kraków

== Final Round ==
Quarterfinal
August 6
(United Arab Emirates) Novi Sad Al-Wahda	21
(Poland) Kraków	14
August 6
(Canada) Saskatoon	19
(Bosnia and Herzegovina) Vitez	21
August 6
(Slovenia) Ljubljana	15
(Serbia) Belgrade	10
August 6
(Serbia) Zemun	20
(Czech Republic) Humpolec	17

Semi-Finals
August 6
(United Arab Emirates) Novi Sad Al-Wahda	21
(Bosnia and Herzegovina) Vitez	18
August 6
(Slovenia) Ljubljana	22
(Serbia) Zemun	14

Final
August 6
(United Arab Emirates) Novi Sad Al-Wahda	21
(Slovenia) Ljubljana	14

== Final standings ==
Qualified for the 2017 FIBA 3x3 World Tour Finals

Rank	Team	Record
1st place, gold medalist(s)	(United Arab Emirates) Novi Sad Al-Wahda	5–0
2nd place, silver medalist(s)	(Slovenia) Ljubljana	3–2
3rd place, bronze medalist(s)	(Serbia) Zemun	3–1
4	(Bosnia and Herzegovina) Vitez	2–2
5	(Canada) Saskatoon	2–1
6	(Poland) Kraków	1–2
7	(Czech Republic) Humpolec	1–2
8	(Serbia) Belgrade	1–2
9	(Czech Republic) Ostrava	1–1
10	(Croatia) Zagreb	0–2
11	(Poland) Kołobrzeg	0–2
12	(Greece) Athens	0–2
