= Michael Linklater =

Canadian basketball player (born 1982)

Personal information
- Born: September 25, 1982 (age 43) Trenton, New Jersey, U.S.
- Listed height: 5 ft 10 in (1.78 m)
- Listed weight: 200 lb (91 kg)

Career information
- High school: Mount Royal Collegiate
- College: University of Saskatchewan
- Playing career: 2010–2019
- Position: Guard
- Number: 3

Career history
- 2010: Edmonton Energy
- 2019: Saskatchewan Rattlers

Career highlights
- CEBL champion (2019); U Sports champion (2010)

Michael Linklater (born September 25, 1982) is a retired Canadian basketball player. He last played for the Saskatchewan Rattlers in the Canadian Elite Basketball League (CEBL). He is a Nehiyaw (Cree). Linklater received the 2018 Tom Longboat Award, which recognizes Aboriginal athletes "for their outstanding contributions to sport in Canada". He won the 2018 Inspire Award in the sports category.

== Early life ==
Linklater was born in Trenton, New Jersey, on September 25, 1982. He is a Nehiyaw (Cree) and a descendant of the Thunderchild First Nation, located on Treaty 6 Territory. Linklater was raised by his great-aunt Maria, and her husband, Walter, who became his legal guardians in Thunder Bay, Ontario. At age 10, both he and his guardians moved to Saskatoon. At 2, he legally changed his last name to Linklater, matching his legal guardians.

Linklater learned how to play basketball in grade school. He attended an inner-city school and was exposed to alcohol and drug abuse from an early age in both his community and in his extended family. His birth mother struggled with drug and alcohol addiction, both of his grandparents died of alcoholism and his half-brother lost his life in his early 20s.

Linklater attended Mount Royal Collegiate. He won Athlete of the Year in grades 9 through 11, competed on both the track & field and the cross country teams, and captained both the football and basketball teams. After graduating from Mount Royal, he attended junior college at the United Tribes Technical College in Bismarck, North Dakota, where he played basketball.

For his second year of post-secondary eligibility, Linklater returned to take classes in the Nutrition program at Southern Alberta Institute of Technology (SAIT) in Calgary. After a year off due to an injury, Linklater transferred to Lakeland College in Lloydminster, Alberta, where he again played basketball. He finished his post-secondary playing career at the University of Saskatchewan where, in 2009–10, the basketball team won its only CanWest Conference Championship and Canadian Intercollegiate Sport (now U Sports) National Championship under his captaincy.

== Career ==
Linklater played for the Edmonton Energy of the International Basketball League. He entered and won a 3-on-3 tournament in Edmonton, advancing with his team to the World Tour Finals in Istanbul where they finished sixth.

Linklater was one of Canada’s best 3-on-3 basketball players; in 2017 he was ranked first in the country and ninth in the world. As a captain of Team Saskatoon, he participated in several FIBA 3x3 World Tour Finals and joined the 3-on-3 world tour in 2012. At the 2017 FIBA 3x3 World Tour Masters tournament in Saskatoon, Linklater helped lead Team Saskatoon to the Final with a 4–0 record, where they lost to Ljubljana. At that time, Team Saskatoon was ranked 5th in the FIBA world rankings. Three-on-three basketball made its Olympic debut in 2020 in Tokyo.

Linklater joined his hometown Saskatchewan Rattlers for the inaugural season of the Canadian Elite Basketball League (CEBL) in 2019. Saskatoon was chosen as the host of the league's first Championship Weekend, and after posting a 11–9 regular season record, the Rattlers won the league's first championship with a 94–83 victory over the Hamilton Honey Badgers. Linklater had announced before the playoffs that he would be retiring. After winning the title, Linklater was quoted as saying, "It's a phenomenal feeling to go out with a championship... just to be part of this family has been amazing."

The Rattlers and the Province of Saskatchewan declared July 5, 2025 to be Michael Linklater day as a celebration of his basketball accomplishments and contributions but also recognizing his community involvement particularly working with First Nations youth. Michael was celebrated during a half time presentation and remained after the game to meet fans, take pictures and sign autographs. The game was won by the Rattlers 93-90 in dramatic fashion as they came back to win over the Ottawa Blackjacks after being down 82-71 at the start of target score time.

== Advocacy ==
Linklater founded a campaign called Boys With Braids to raise awareness of the cultural significance of braided hair as worn by indigenous boys and men. His aim was to educate all on the importance and significance of indigenous traditions. He also founded Prime Basketball Development, which engages with Indigenous communities. Prime Basketball Development holds clinics and educates indigenous youth in both basketball and the importance of living a healthy and sober lifestyle.

== Awards ==
Linklater has been the recipient of awards for his work as an advocate for Indigenous youth and his community involvement. These include:

- Saskatchewan CBC future 40 under 40
- Chief of Police award for community service
- Circle of Honour for Sport
- Sasktel Aboriginal Youth Award of Excellence
- Indspire Award, in the sport category (2018)
- Tom Longboat Award (2018), in the men’s category, awarded to Aboriginal athletes for their outstanding contributions to sport in Canada.
