= 2015 PSA Annual Awards =

The 2015 PSA Annual Awards was an accolade organized by the Philippine Sportswriters Association, the oldest media organization based in the Philippines, helmed by the president Jun Lumibao of Business Mirror, in cooperation with the Philippine Sports Commission, Smart Communications, San Miguel Corporation, Milo, MVP Sports Foundation and Meralco. The awards were given to the Philippine sportsmen in recognition of their achievements in 2014.

Known as the "Oscars" of Philippine sports, the awards proper was held at the One Esplanade, Mall of Asia Complex, Pasay on February 16, 2015. Veteran sportscasters Quinito Henson and Patricia Bermudez-Hizon will be served as the emcees of the formal program. PSC Chairman Richie Garcia was invited to become a guest of honor in the said event, Philippine Olympic Committee chairman Peping Cojuangco is also part of the honorable guests. NU Pep Squad, the 2014 UAAP Cheerdance Competition champion has been performed during the awarding.

Asian Games gold medalist Daniel Caluag was named as the Athlete of the Year, the first time in 7 years where only one athlete was recognized by the PSA as the top sportsman of the year after Manny Pacquiao, in 2008.

== Honor Roll list ==
=== Special awards ===
The following list is the special awards given in the PSA Annual Awards.

Award	Winner	Sport/Team
PSA Sportsman of the Year	Daniel Caluag	BMX cycling
PSA President's Award	National University Bulldogs (team handled by Eric Altamirano, star players: Glenn Khobuntin, Troy Rosario, Gelo Adolino, Nico Javelona, Alfred Aroga and Henri Beteyene)	Collegiate basketball
Lifetime Achievement Award	1973 Philippine men's national basketball team represented by Robert Jaworski, Bogs Adornado, Yoyong Martirez, Manny Paner, Leo Arnaiz (given to Francis Arnaiz), Tembong Melencio (given to Richie Melencio) and Coach Juan Cutillas (given to Joey Campos)	Basketball
Hall of Fame Award	Mitsubishi Lancer International Junior Tennis Championship	Tennis
Sports Patron of the Year	MVP Sports Foundation	Various (Sports advocacy)
Executive of the Year	Hans Sy	National University Bulldogs
Excellence in Basketball	Tim Cone	Basketball (Purefoods Star Hotshots)
Miss Volleyball	Alyssa Valdez	Collegiate volleyball (Ateneo Lady Eagles / Amihan Pilipinas)
Mr. Taekwando	Jean Pierre Sabido	Taekwando
Golfers of the Year	Princess Superal; Tony Lascuna	Golf
Milo Junior Athletes of the Year	Paulo Bersamina	Chess
Milo Junior Athletes of the Year	Kyla Soguilon	Swimming
Princess and Prince of the Night	Alyssa Valdez	Volleyball
Princess and Prince of the Night	Michael Christian Martinez	Figure Skating

=== Major citations ===
Winner	Sport/Team
Donnie "Ahas" Nietes	Boxing
San Mig Super Coffee Mixers (now Purefoods)	Basketball
Luis Gabriel Moreno	Archery
Michael Christian Martinez	Skating
San Beda Red Lions	Collegiate basketball
June Mar Fajardo	Basketball (San Miguel Beermen)
Kiefer Ravena	Collegiate basketball (Ateneo Blue Eagles)
Mark Galedo	Cycling (7-Eleven)
Daniella Uy	Golf
Mikee Charlene Suede	Chess
Jessie Aligaga	Wushu
Jean Claude Saclag	Wushu
Philippines national dragon boat team	Dragon boat
Philippine poomsae team (male under 30)	Poomsae
Philippine poomsae team (freestyle)	Poomsae
Kid Molave (owned by Manny Santos)	Horse racing
Jockey Jonathan Basco Hernandez	Horse racing
Dondon Portugal	GT riding

=== Tony Siddayao Awards for Under 17 athletes ===
Winner	Sport/Team
Zachary David	Karting
Gabriel Tayao Cabrera	Karting
Paulo Bersamina	Chess
Mikahaela Fortuna	Golf
Kyla Soguilon	Swimming

=== Minor citations ===
Winner	Sport/Team/Description
Manila West (composed by Terrence Romeo, Rey Guevarra, KG Canaleta, and Aldrech Ramos)	3x3 basketball (2014 FIBA 3x3 World Tour Finals)
NU Lady Bulldogs	Collegiate women's basketball
San Beda Red Cubs	Junior's basketball
Anita Koykka	Powerlifting
Maybelline Masuda	Jiu-jitsu
Annie Ramirez	Jiu-jitsu/Judo
Geylord Coveta	Windsurfing
Philippine Taekwando Team (male under 30)	Taekwando
Francis Aaron Agojo	Taekwando
Philippine Taekwando Team in the World Taekwando Championships; Jeordan Dominguez, Juvenile Faye Crisostomo, Joe Vanni Colega, Jaylord Seridon, Rolando Reyes, Jr., Mcavynger Alob, Clement Tsulong Tan, Elisabella Cesista, Leanarda Nicole Landrio, Rinna Babanto, Jocel Lyn Ninobla, and Janna Dominique Oliva	Taekwando
Kenneth San Andres	Motocross
Peter Gabriel Magnaye	Badminton
Paul Vivas	Badminton
August Benedicto	Triathlon (Ironman 70.3)
Claire Adorna	Swimming
Bong Lopez	Golfing coach
Philippine Basketball Marathon	Charity basketball
UE Red Warriors	Boys volleyball
Adamson Lady Falcons	Collegiate women's softball
Saturday Afternoon Gentleman Sailors of Subic, Zambales	Surfing
Pagpupugay: 100 Taon ng Philippine Sports (organized by Chino Trinidad)	Sports greats tribute
Philippine Collegiate Champions League	Inter-regional amateur basketball
Accel	Sports outfitter (official outfitter of Shakey's V-League)
Unilab Active Health Run	Running
The Junior Golfers League	Golf

=== Posthumous awards ===
The Posthumous awards is given to the sports personalities who died in 2014. They will given an award and a one-minute silence for the honorees.

- Ely Capacio (former PBA executive and player, died February 23, ruptured aneurysm)
- Bryan Gahol (former MBA & PBA player and Laguna politician, died March 31, car accident)
- Rodolfo Lordan, Jr. (snooker, died April 5, "bangungot")
- Anthony Villanueva (1964 Summer Olympics silver medalist for Boxing, died May 13, heart failure)
- Enzo Pastor (racing car champion, died June 12, ambushed)
- Kurt Bachmann (basketball player and part of the 1962 Asian Games men's basketball team, died August 29, complications from diabetes)
- Isabelo Hilario (drag race car driver, died December 3, ambushed)
- Howie Basilio (Manila Chronicle sports writer, died December 11, cause of death withheld)
- Danny Romero (PTV 4 and Silverstar Sports commentator and sports writer)

== See also ==
- 2014 in Philippine sports
- PSA Sportsman of the Year
