= Team San Juan =

Men's professional 3x3 basketball club in Puerto Rico

- Leagues: FIBA 3x3 World Tour
- Founded: 2012; 14 years ago
- Location: San Juan, Puerto Rico
- President: Óscar Hourruitiner
- Head coach: Pedro González
- Team captain: Antonio Ralat
- Championships: 1 World Tour

Team San Juan (Spanish: Equipo San Juan) is a men's professional 3x3 basketball club based in San Juan, Puerto Rico. The team plays in the FIBA 3x3 World Tour, of which it was the first champion by winning the inaugural tournament in 2012. Team San Juan was among the founding teams of Puerto Rico’s domestic 3x3 league, N3XT.

== History ==
=== 2012, World Tour champions ===
Composed by Andrés Ortiz, Jonathan García, José López and William Orozco, Team San Juan made its debut in the first edition of the FIBA 3x3 World Tour. The team opened its participation at the 2012 New York Masters on August 18, 2012, as part of Pool A. In its first game Team San Juan defeated NY Bronx 21:7. In the second game, they outlasted Dallas 21:7. Team San Juan reached the time limit for the first time in a 16:12 win over Edmonton. On August 19, 2012, the team opened the Masters’ second date by defeating Orlando with scores of 21:15 in the final game of pool play. In the L8 (last eight) round, Team San Juan outlasted Minnesota 14:13 in a game that reached the time limit. They won their semifinal against Moscow by two points, 17:15. Team San Juan received its first loss in the final of Masters, which Denver with scores of 17:19.

With their performance, the team gathered enough points to qualify for the 2012 World Tour Final held at Miami in September 2012. Team San Juan was part of Pool B in this tournament, opening its participation with a 16:8 win over Miami. Team San Juan closed the first date by defeating Bucharest UPB, 16:13. In the continuation of pool play, they bested Neuquén 20:18. The next game was their first loss of the tournament, falling against Split with scores of 13:17. Team San Juan closed this phase with a 21:9 win over Khabarovsk and advanced. In the L8 round, they eliminated Denver 20:18. In the semifinal, the team advanced with a win over Edmonton 19:17. Team San Juan defeated Split in a final that went to the time limit (20:16) to become the inaugural FIBA 3x3 World Tour champion.

=== 2013–2014, inactivity ===
Team San Juan hosted the 2013 San Juan Masters in August 2013. The team opened the tournament with a 21:7 win over Miami. In its next game, Team San Juan outlasted Toronto 14:13 in a game that finished at the regulatory time limit. The team closed pool play by defeating NY Queens 20:16. Team San Juan closed this season after being eliminated by Philadelphia with scores of 12:15 in the L8 round of the San Juan Masters. During the 2014 offseason, the roster was changed to include Edgardo Garcia, Jorge Matos Nieves and Christian Rodríguez Santos, while only José López remained from previous years.

This version of Team San Juan participated in the 2014 Chicago Masters as part of Pool B, but did not experience the same success as the original iteration. Their sole win was a 18:16 debut against Winnipeg, followed by losses to Chicago (10:21) to close pool play and Chi-Town (16:18) in the L8 round. In May 2015, Andrés Ortiz died in a car accident. Team San Juan did not participate in the World Tour that year, beginning a four year hiatus from 3x3 competition, which resulted in a drop in the ranking. Only Jonathan García continued active in the circuit, joining Caguas in the 2016 FIBA 3x3 World Tour.

=== Return, BSN N3XT (2019) ===
A new version of Team San Juan composed by Josue Erazo, Benjamín Colón, Tjader Fernández, Wil Martínez, Ángel Matías and a returning Jonathan García entered the Ghetto Basket Riga Challenger 2019 as a wildcard. The team was placed in Pool B and opened its participation with a 13:16 loss to Amsterdam. Ralja was responsible for Team San Juan not advancing to the L8 stage by handing them a 16:20 loss. Days later, the team entered the Raiffeisen Bank Bucharest Challenger 2019 as a wildcard. As part of Pool B, Team San Juan was edged by Rotterdam 21:22 in overtime. In its second game, the team defeated Riga 22:20 to advance. Team San Juan was eliminated with a 14:21 loss to Edmonton in the quarterfinals.

To close the season, the team entered the first stop of the Elite DCR Challenge of the N3XT (then sponsored by the Baloncesto Superior Nacional as BSN N3XT) held at Bayamón, Puerto Rico. As part of Open Pool A, Team San Juan defeated Mágicos 22:6 to open their participation. This was followed by a 22:10 win over Tiburones. Team San Juan continued by defeating Ponce 500 21:4. Another victory was scored over Titanes de Guayama, with scores of 21:7. Team San Juan edged Río Piedras in an inter-city game 21:20. They advanced undefeated with 21:19 win over Ponce in the semifinals. In the finals, Team San Juan defeated Caguas in another 21:19 game.

=== Pandemic, roster instability (2021–2022) ===
Due to the COVID-19 pandemic, the practice of team sports was prohibited in Puerto Rico during the fall of 2020. This prevented any professional team from practicing and precluded the organization of domestic leagues or the preparation required to join international competition. Prior to the 2021 FIBA 3x3 World Tour, Team San Juan restructured its roster with the inclusion of players from other 3x3 teams with experience in the circuit or Puerto Rico men's national 3x3 team. These included Gilberto Clavell (Caguas, national team), Luis Hernández (Caguas), Josué Erazo (national team), Tjader Fernández (national team) and Jorge Matos (Aguada). Joining this new lineup was a returning Ángel Matías.

Team San Juan entered the 2021 Lipik Challenger as a wildcard and was placed in the qualifying draw. In its first game of the tournament, they defeated Dusseldorf 21:16. With a 21:20 win over Humpolec, Team San Juan advanced to the main draw. As part of Pool A, they defeated Sansar 21:17. In the continuation of pool play, Liman defeated Team San Juan with scores of 21:17. In the quarterfinals, they advanced with a 21:16 win over Novi Sad. In the semifinals, Team San Juan outscored Bielefeld 20:16 in a game that went to the time limit. Antwerp won the final by weathering an advance by the team and holding on to a 20:18 lead.

In August 2021, Team San Juan participated in the 2021 Lausanne Masters being placed in Pool D. Despite their direct classification, the participation required an agreement with the BSN where the players were active. In their first game, they lost to Ub 12:21. This was followed by a 19:17 win in overtime over Princeton. In the quarterfinals Team San Juan defeated Riga, which had three members of the Latvia men's national 3x3 team that won gold at Tokyo 2020, with scores of 21:20. In the semifinals they were matched against Liman, the number one team in the 3x3 world ranking, winning the game 20:18. In the finals Team San Juan defeated Ub in a rematch (21:13). Matías was named the Lausanne Masters Most Valuable Player award, while Clavell was the tournament’s top scorer with 40 points.

A reduced version of Team San Juan, missing Clavell due to his participation in the BSN postseason, won the first date of the 2021 N3XT season. The team won its first game over Humacao, 21:13. They then bested the LPB All-Stars (composed by players from the Liga de Baloncesto Puertorriqueña) with scores of 22:14. In the final Team San Juan defeated Mayagüez 21:19, which secured also a spot in the Mexico City Masters by finishing second. This abridged version experienced trouble filling the vacancy left by Clavell, losing both of their games at the Abu Dhabi Masters with results of 14-22 in the opener against Ub and 13-15 against Gagarin. Despite this setback, Team San Juan qualified to the FIBA 3x3 World Tour in Jeddah. Clavell suffered a knee injury in the BSN and Luis Hernández was activated to fill his place in the roster.

Team San Juan opened the Mexico City Masters by scoring 21:20 wins over Šakiai Gulbele and Omaha South 3Ball in the pool stage. By joining Mayagüez, this was the first time that two teams from Puerto Rico participated in the same tournament of the tour.

=== Player specialization (2023–present) ===
Intending to avoid the recurrent scheduling issues with the BSN that had limited its ability to secure key players, the team managed to secure a grant for Luis Cuascut, Adrián Ocasio, Antonio Ralat, Leandro Allende and Brian Vázquez from the Puerto Rico Olympic Committee (COPUR) so that they could compete exclusively in the 3x3 category. The first tournament entered by this version of San Juan was the 3x3 Winter Tour, which they opened with a 22:8 win over Serbian Blue Blood before dropping the second game to China Mix, 15:21. In their next game, San Juan defeated 3x3 Kruševac Master (21:15). The team closed their participation in a loss to Wuxi Huishan Ne 3x3, 16:21.

In April 2023, the team classified to the Edmonton Masters by winning the 3rd 3x3 Puerto Rico Open by besting Caguas VK (18:16) in the final. To close the month, San Juan participated in the Lausanne Super Quest, opening with a 21:9 win over the host in Pool D play. They advanced by defeating Liman (21:17) and Toronto (21:15) in the semifinals. In the final, San Juan defeated Düsseldorf, 21:19, to win the tournament and qualify to the Manila Masters.

== Trophies and awards ==
=== Trophies ===
- FIBA 3x3 World Tour
  - Winners (1): 2012

=== Individual awards ===
FIBA 3x3 Lausanne Masters MVP

- Angel Matías

== Notable players ==
- Andrés Ortiz
