= 2017 FIBA 3x3 World Tour – Utsunomiya Masters =

The 2017 FIBA 3x3 World Tour Utsunomiya Masters was a 3x3 basketball tournament held in Utsunomiya, Japan at a temporary venue constructed at the Futaarayama Jinja shrine from July 29–30, 2017. It was the second stop on the 2017 FIBA 3x3 World Tour. The top team, Novi Sad Al-Wahda qualified for the 2017 FIBA 3x3 World Tour Final.

== Participants ==
12 teams qualified to participate at the Utsunomiya Masters. Team Ljubljana was hard seeded for the tournament, but finished 2nd at the Nanjing 3x3 Challenger, thus the third-place finisher Team Ulaanbaatar qualified. Ljubljana also won the World Hoops 3x3 Challenger, thus the third-place finisher Team Kraków qualified.

Event	Date	Location	Berths	Qualified
Burger King 3x3 Quest Tour	March 25, 2017	(New Zealand) Auckland	1	(New Zealand) Tamaki Central known as Team Auckland for the tournament.
Nanjing 3x3 Challenger 2017	April 29–30, 2017	(China) Nanjing	2	(Serbia) Team Zemun Masters; ~~(Slovenia) Team Ljubljana~~ (Monaco) Team Ulaanbaatar
World Hoops Penang 3x3 Challenger 2017	May 13–14, 2017	(Malaysia) George Town, Penang	2	~~(Serbia) Team Ljubljana~~ (Russia) Team St. Petersburg (Poland) Team Kraków
Ulaanbaatar 3x3 Challenger 2017	June 3–4, 2017	(Mongolia) Ulaanbaatar	2	(Serbia) Team Liman (United Arab Emirates) Team Novi Sad Al-Wahda
2017 Hsin An Cup Final	July 2, 2017	(Chinese Taipei) Hsinchu	1	(United States) Team Dada Supreme Taiwan known at the tournament as Team Hsinchu
South Korean Tour	July 22, 2017	(South Korea) Seoul	1	(South Korea) Team Seoul
Hard Seeded Qualifiers	N/A	N/A	2	(Slovenia) Team Ljubljana (Slovenia) Team Piran
Wildcard Qualifier	N/A	N/A	1	(Japan) Team Okayama
TOTAL			12	

== Preliminary round ==
=== Pool A ===
Qualified for Quarterfinals

Team	Pld	W	L	PF	PA	PD	Pts
(Japan) Okayama	2	2	0	35	30	+5	4
(Mongolia) Ulaanbaatar	2	1	1	32	30	+2	3
(Slovenia) Ljubljana	2	0	2	23	28	−5	2

July 29, 2017
Ljubljana (Slovenia)	11–14	(Mongolia) Ulaanbaatar
Okayama (Japan)	19–18	(Mongolia) Ulaanbaatar
Ljubljana (Slovenia)	12–14	(Japan) Okayama

=== Pool B ===
Qualified for Quarterfinals

Team	Pld	W	L	PF	PA	PD	Pts
(United Arab Emirates) Novi Sad Al-Wahda	2	2	0	42	28	+14	4
(Russia) St. Petersburg	2	1	1	38	35	+3	3
(South Korea) Seoul	2	0	2	26	43	−17	2

July 29, 2017
Novi Sad Al-Wahda (United Arab Emirates)	21–12	(South Korea) Seoul
St. Petersburg (Russia)	22–14	(South Korea) Seoul
Novi Sad Al-Wahda (United Arab Emirates)	21–16	(Russia) St. Petersburg

=== Pool C ===
Qualified for Quarterfinals

Team	Pld	W	L	PF	PA	PD	Pts
(Slovenia) Piran	2	2	0	40	28	+12	4
(Poland) Kraków	2	1	1	38	30	+8	3
(New Zealand) Auckland	2	0	2	23	43	−20	2

July 29, 2017
Piran (Slovenia)	22–11	(New Zealand) Auckland
Kraków (Poland)	21–12	(New Zealand) Auckland
Piran (Slovenia)	18–17	(Poland) Kraków

=== Pool D ===
Qualified for Quarterfinals

Team	Pld	W	L	PF	PA	PD	Pts
(Serbia) Zemun	2	2	0	42	36	+6	4
(Serbia) Liman	2	1	1	41	36	+5	3
(Chinese Taipei) Hsinchu	2	0	2	30	43	−13	2

July 29, 2017
Liman (Serbia)	22-15	(Chinese Taipei) Hsinchu
Zemun (Serbia)	21–15	(Chinese Taipei) Hsinchu
Zemun (Serbia)	21–19	(Serbia) Liman

== Final Round ==
Quarterfinal
July 30
(Japan) Okayama	11
(Serbia) Liman	21
July 30
(Slovenia) Piran	22
(Russia) St. Petersburg	9
July 30
(United Arab Emirates) Novi Sad Al-Wahda	21
(Poland) Kraków	12
July 30
(Serbia) Zemun	10
(Mongolia) Ulaanbaatar	13

Semi-Finals
July 30
(Serbia) Liman	15
(Slovenia) Piran	22
July 30
(United Arab Emirates) Novi Sad Al-Wahda	18
(Mongolia) Ulaanbaatar	11

Final
July 30
(Slovenia) Piran	16
(United Arab Emirates) Novi Sad Al-Wahda	17

== Final standings ==
Qualified for the 2017 FIBA 3x3 World Tour Finals

Rank	Team	Record
1st place, gold medalist(s)	(United Arab Emirates) Novi Sad Al-Wahda	5–0
2nd place, silver medalist(s)	(Slovenia) Piran	4–1
3rd place, bronze medalist(s)	(Serbia) Liman	2–2
4	(Mongolia) Ulaanbaatar	2–2
5	(Serbia) Zemun	2–1
6	(Japan) Okayama	2–1
7	(Poland) Kraków	1–2
8	(Russia) St. Petersburg	1–2
9	(Chinese Taipei) Hsinchu	0–2
10	(South Korea) Seoul	0–2
11	(Slovenia) Ljubljana	0–2
12	(New Zealand) Auckland	0–2
