= 2014 FIBA 3x3 World Tour Beijing Masters =

The 2014 FIBA 3x3 World Tour Beijing Masters was a 3x3 basketball tournament that was held in Beijing, China at the Wukesong Hi-Park from 2–3 August 2014. The top team qualified for the 2014 FIBA 3x3 World Tour Final which was held in Sendai, Japan. The Word Tour Final is branded as a "Tokyo" Final but recently this was changed to Sendai.

== Participants ==
Twelve teams were qualified to participate at the Beijing Masters.

Event	Date	Location	Berths	Qualified
Jeddah Basketball Championship	7–9 March	(Saudi Arabia) Jeddah	1	Team Jeddah
3X3 Tournament Exe Yokohama	19–21 April	(Japan) Yokohama	1	Team Yokohama
2014 KFC 3 on 3 Elite Competition	2 June	(China) Qinhuangdao	1	Team Guangzhou
Pacific Open	5–8 June	(Russia) Moscow	1	Team Vladivostok
UBA 3X3 World Tour Qualifier	31 May - 8 June	Taiwan	1	Team New Taipei
3X3 Tournament Exe Nagoya	15 June	(Japan) Nagoya	1	Team Nagoya
2014 KBA FIBA 3x3 Challenge	18 July	(South Korea) Seoul	2	Team Yongin; Team Seoul
Barakat Travel 3x3 Summer Challenge	19 July	(Lebanon) Hazmiyeh	1	Team Beirut
2014 FIBA World Tour Qualifier in China	21 June - 27 July	(China) Wukesong	2	Team Wukesong; Team Changping
2014 World Tour Qualification BSU	25 - 27 July	(China) Beijing	1	Team Beijing BSU
TOTAL			12	

== Final standings ==
Qualified for the 2014 FIBA 3x3 World Tour Finals

Rank	Team	Record
1st place, gold medalist(s)	(China) Wukesong	5–0
2nd place, silver medalist(s)	(Japan) Nagoya	3–2
3rd place, bronze medalist(s)	(Japan) Yokohama	3–1
4	(Chinese Taipei) New Taipei	3–1
5	(Russia) Vladivostok	2–1
6	(China) Changping	1–2
7	(South Korea) Yongin	1–2
8	(Lebanon) Beirut	1–2
9	(China) Beijing BSU	0–2
10	(China) Guangzhou	0–2
11	(South Korea) Seoul	0–2
12	(China) Xi'an	0–2
