= Novi Sad (disambiguation) =

Novi Sad is the second largest city in Serbia.

Novi Sad may also refer to:

- FK Novi Sad, football club from the city
- KK Novi Sad, basketball club from the city

== Abroad ==
- Novi Sad Friendship Bridge, a bridge in England, named after the city of Novi Sad
- Novi Sad Al-Wahda, 3x3 basketball club from Abu Dhabi, United Arab Emirates
