= Dušan Bulut =

Serbian basketball player (born 1985)

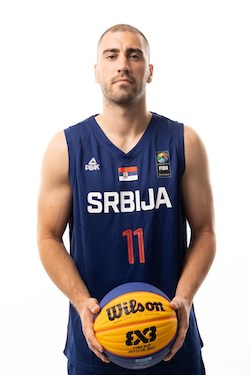
- Bulut in 2019

Personal information
- Born: 23 October 1985 (age 41) Novi Sad, SR Serbia, SFR Yugoslavia
- Listed height: 1.91 m (6 ft 3 in)
- Listed weight: 95 kg (209 lb)

Career information
- NBA draft: 2007: undrafted
- Playing career: 2003–2024
- Position: Point guard

Career history
- 2011–2012: Kožuv
- 2012–2013: Akademik
- 2014–2015: Meridiana
- 2015–2016: Vojvodina
- 2018–2019: OKK Konstantin
- 2013–2021: Novi Sad (3x3)
- 2021–2022: Power (3x3)
- 2022: Partizan Beograd (3x3)
- 2022: Badalona (3x3)
- 2022–: Aliens (3x3)

Career highlights
- 4× FIBA 3x3 World Tour winner (2014, 2015, 2018, 2019); 2× FIBA 3x3 World Tour MVP (2015,2018); 2× FIBA 3x3 World Cup MVP (2016, 2018); Serbian 3x3 Player of the Year (2019)
Medals
Men's 3x3 basketball
Representing Serbia
Olympic Games
| Bronze medal – third place | 2020 Tokyo | Team |
World Cup
| Gold medal – first place | 2012 Greece |
| Gold medal – first place | 2016 China |
| Gold medal – first place | 2017 France |
| Gold medal – first place | 2018 Philippines |
| Silver medal – second place | 2014 Russia |
European Championships
| Gold medal – first place | 2018 Romania |
| Gold medal – first place | 2019 Hungary |
| Silver medal – second place | 2016 Romania |
European Games
| Bronze medal – third place | 2015 Baku |

Dušan Domović Bulut (Serbian Cyrillic: Душан Домовић Булyт; born 23 October 1985) is a former Serbian professional basketball player who is former world No. 1 ranked in men's individual 3x3 rankings by the International Basketball Federation (FIBA). He played for Aliens and is former member of Serbia men's national 3x3 team. He is widely considered to be the greatest 3x3 basketball player of all time. He retired in 2024.

== Early life ==
Bulut was born and raised in Novi Sad, Serbia. His interest in basketball began at the age of nine. He soon began playing on courts around his neighborhood; back then, 3-on-3 basketball was essentially the only way the sport was played in the streets of the city.

== 3x3 career ==
Bulut started to play at the FIBA 3X3 World Tour in August 2012. He plays for Serbian team Novi Sad.

=== BIG3 career ===
On May 3, 2019, Bulut was selected with the 24th overall pick by the Ball Hogs in the 2019 BIG3 draft. On June 21, 2019, it was announced that Bulut had to withdraw from playing in BIG3 after being allegedly threatened by FIBA with not being able to play in the Olympics if he didn't leave the league.

On June 15, 2021, Bulut was selected with the 3rd overall pick by Power in the 2021 BIG3 draft.

He plays for team Aliens in the BIG3, 3-on-3 basketball league.

=== National team career ===
Bulut represented Serbia in 3x3 basketball. He won two gold medals at the FIBA 3x3 World Championships, 2012 in Greece and 2016 in China and silver medal at the 2014 tournament in Russia. At the 2017 FIBA 3x3 World Cup he won his 3rd gold medal for Serbia and was selected to the FIBA 3x3 World Cup 2017 Team of the Tournament.

== Basketball career ==
Bulut played basketball for his hometown teams Meridiana and Vojvodina of the Basketball League of Serbia B (2nd tier). He also played for Kožuv in the Macedonian First League.

== Awards and accomplishments ==
- FIBA 3x3 World Tour winner: 3 (2014, 2015, 2018, 2019)

=== Individual ===
- 2x FIBA 3x3 World Cup MVP Award: 2016, 2018
- 2x FIBA 3x3 World Tour MVP Award: 2015, 2018
- FIBA Europe 3x3 Championships MVP Award: 2018
- 3x FIBA 3x3 World Cup Team of the tournament: 2016, 2017, 2018
- FIBA Europe 3x3 Championships Team of the tournament: 2018
- FIBA 3x3 World's #1 player award: 2015
- FIBA 3x3 World Tour Most Spectacular Player: 2016, 2017, 2018
- Serbian B League Top Scorer: 2015
