= 2017 FIBA 3x3 World Tour – Lausanne Masters =

The 2017 FIBA 3x3 World Tour Lausanne Masters was a 3x3 basketball tournament held in Lausanne, Switzerland at a temporary venue constructed next to the stone arches of the imposing bridge known as Le Grand Pont from August 25–26, 2017. This was the fourth stop on the 2017 FIBA 3x3 World Tour.

== Participants ==
12 teams qualified to participate at the Lausanne Masters.

Event	Date	Location	Berths	Qualified
The Hague 3x3 Challenger 2017	June 10, 2017	(Netherlands) The Hague	2	(United Arab Emirates) Team Novi Sad Al-Wahda (Croatia) Team Split
Basket Tour Rijeka - Masters	July 22, 2017	(Croatia) Rijeka	1	(Slovenia) Oštarija Fortica known at the tournament as Team Kranj
Sprite 3x3 Tallinn Open 2017	July 29, 2017	(Estonia) Tallinn	1	(Estonia) Paide Spordikeskus know at the tournament as Team Paide
Open de France	July 29, 2017	(France) Lyon	1	(France) Amiral Camp know at the tournament as Team Cergy
Streetball Finals - Riccione	July 28–30, 2017	(Italy) Riccione	1	(Italy) 4nci Mestre known at the tournament as Team Mestre
Ljubljana Open 3x3 Quest 2017	August 13, 2017	(Slovenia) Ljubljana	1	(Slovenia) 3x3 Logatec known at the tournament as Team Logatec
Raiffeisen Bank Bucharest 3x3 Challenger 2017	August 12–13, 2017	(Romania) Bucharest	2	(Latvia) Riga Ghetto Basket known at the tournament as Team Riga (Serbia) Team Zemun
Hard Seeded Qualifiers	N/A	N/A	2	(Canada) Team Saskatoon (Poland) Kraków R8 Basket known at the tournament as Team Kraków
Wildcard Qualifier	N/A	N/A	1	(Switzerland) Team Lausanne
TOTAL			12	

== Preliminary round ==
=== Pool A ===
Qualified for Quarterfinals

Team	Pld	W	L	PF	PA	PD	Pts
(Switzerland) Lausanne	2	2	0	38	27	+11	4
(United Arab Emirates) Novi Sad Al-Wahda	2	1	1	36	29	+7	3
(Estonia) Paide	2	0	2	25	43	−18	2

August 25, 2017
Novi Sad Al-Wadha (United Arab Emirates)	22–12	(Estonia) Paide
Paide (Estonia)	13–21	(Switzerland) Lausanne
Novi Sad Al-Wadha (United Arab Emirates)	14–17	(Switzerland) Lausanne

=== Pool B ===
Qualified for Quarterfinals

Team	Pld	W	L	PF	PA	PD	Pts
(Latvia) Riga	2	2	0	43	21	+22	4
(Serbia) Zemun	2	1	1	33	32	+1	3
(Slovenia) Logatec	2	0	2	21	44	−23	2

August 25, 2017
Zemun (Serbia)	22–11	(Slovenia) Logatec
Riga (Latvia)	22–10	(Slovenia) Logatec
Zemun (Serbia)	11–21	(Latvia) Riga

=== Pool C ===
Qualified for Quarterfinals

Team	Pld	W	L	PF	PA	PD	Pts
(Poland) Kraków	2	2	0	41	22	+19	4
(Croatia) Split	2	1	1	27	32	−5	3
(Italy) Mestre	2	0	2	26	39	−13	2

August 25, 2017
Kraków (Poland)	20–15	(Italy) Mestre
Split (Croatia)	19–11	(Italy) Mestre
Kraków (Poland)	21–8	(Croatia) Split

=== Pool D ===
Qualified for Quarterfinals

Team	Pld	W	L	PF	PA	PD	Pts
(Slovenia) Kranj	2	2	0	39	32	+7	4
(France) Cergy	2	1	1	36	38	−2	3
(Canada) Saskatoon	2	0	2	34	39	−5	2

August 25, 2017
Kranj (Slovenia)	20–16	(France) Cergy
Saskatoon (Canada)	18–20	(France) Cergy
Kranj (Slovenia)	19–16	(Canada) Saskatoon

== Final Round ==
Quarterfinal
August 26
(Switzerland) Lausanne	16
(France) Cergy	12
August 26
(Poland) Kraków	19
(Serbia) Zemun	13
August 26
(Latvia) Riga	20
(Croatia) Split	12
August 26
(Slovenia) Kranj	13
(United Arab Emirates) Novi Sad Al-Wadha	14

Semi-Finals
August 26
(Switzerland) Lausanne	21
(Poland) Kraków	14
August 26
(Latvia) Riga	13
(United Arab Emirates) Novi Sad Al-Wadha	18

Final
August 26
(Switzerland) Lausanne	15
(United Arab Emirates) Novi Sad Al-Wadha	20

== Final standings ==
Qualified for the 2017 FIBA 3x3 World Tour Finals

Rank	Team	Record
1st place, gold medalist(s)	(United Arab Emirates) Novi Sad Al-Wadha	4-1
2nd place, silver medalist(s)	(Switzerland) Lausanne	4–1
3rd place, bronze medalist(s)	(Latvia) Riga	3–1
4	(Poland) Kraków	3–1
5	(Slovenia) Kranj	2–1
6	(France) Cergy	1–2
7	(Serbia) Zemun	1–2
8	(Croatia) Split	1–2
9	(Canada) Saskatoon	0–2
10	(Italy) Mestre	0–2
11	(Estonia) Paide	0–2
12	(Slovenia) Logatec	0–2
