= Burnaby Mountain Secondary School =

Burnaby Mountain Secondary
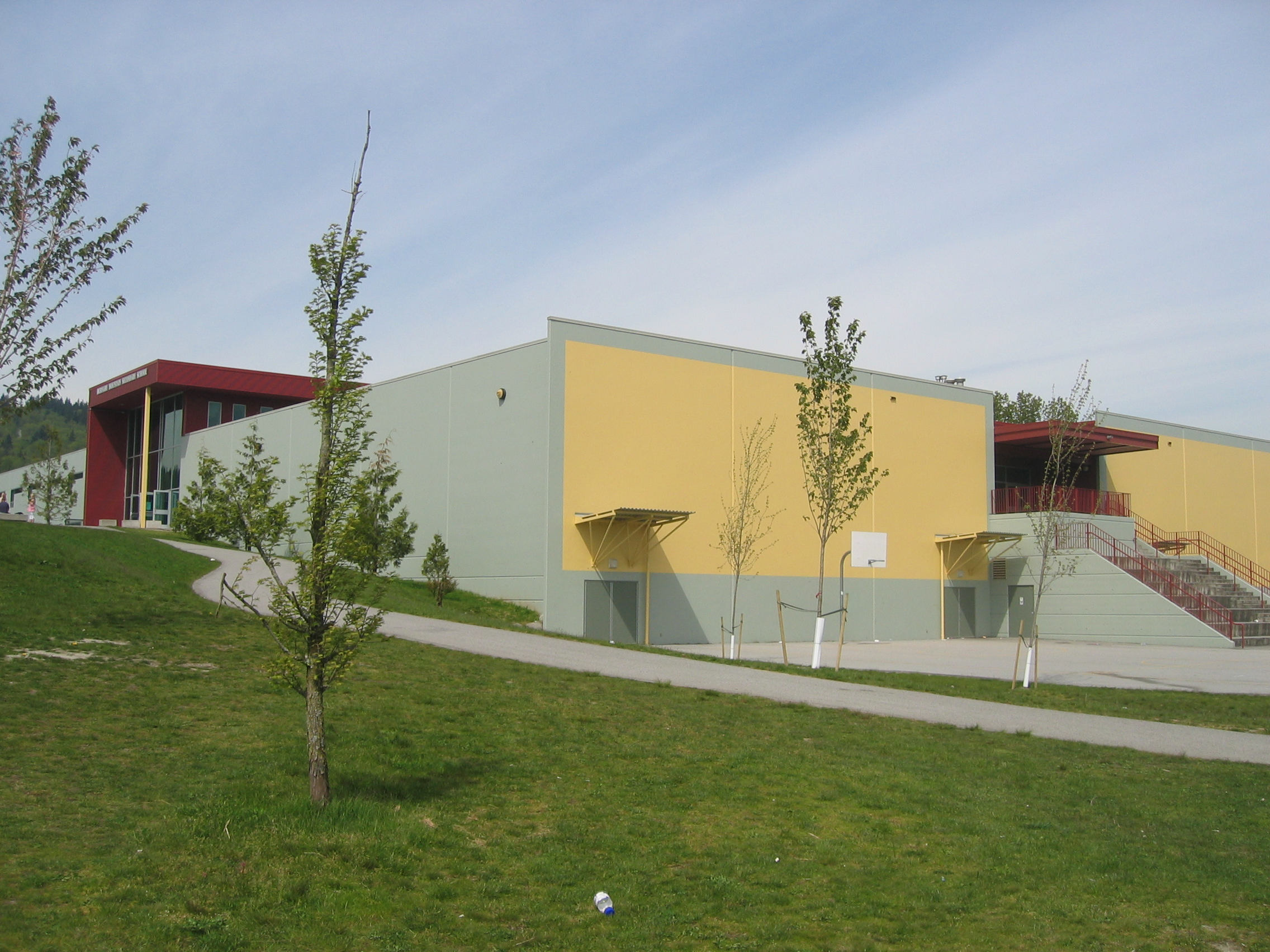
- Burnaby Mountain Secondary School in British Columbia, Canada.

Location
- 8800 Eastlake Drive; Burnaby, British Columbia, V3J 7X5; Canada; 49°15′18″N 122°54′41″W

Information
- School type: Public, high school
- Motto: Respect, Excellence, Responsibility
- Established: 2000
- School board: School District 41 Burnaby
- School number: 4141001
- Principal: Mr. David Rawnsley
- Staff: 107
- Grades: 8-12
- Enrollment: 1,436 (2015)
- Language: English
- Colours: Green and White
- Mascot: Lion
- Team name: Lions
- Website: mountain.sd41.bc.ca

Burnaby Mountain Secondary School is in Burnaby, British Columbia, Canada. It is three stories and located at 8800 Eastlake Drive, at the intersection with Beaverbrook Drive. It is named after nearby Burnaby Mountain, which is also home to Simon Fraser University. The school is close by the Production Way-University SkyTrain station.

== Athletics ==
Burnaby Mountain is recognized for a variety of competitive athletics teams for students including basketball, volleyball, swimming, soccer, track and field, and ultimate frisbee. The school has won many regional banners in swimming, cross country, volleyball, and basketball. The head of the athletics department is Larry Ryan, who stirred local news attention for his teaching suspension in January 2021, when he threw a dumbbell at a student's face. The coaches for the teams are often teachers, community volunteers, alumni, and current students. At the end of every school year, the athletics department holds an annual athletics banquet to celebrate the accomplishments of students.

== Entertainment ==
The school plays itself in a fictional "Burnaby, Washington" in the 2007 film The Invisible, starring British Columbia native Justin Chatwin and Alex O'Loughlin. The film was shot near the school cafeteria, a digitally-modified 3rd-floor classroom, in the hallways and in the gym. The school banner used in the movie was donated to Burnaby Mountain Secondary.

== World record ==
The school attempted to break a Guinness world record for the longest basketball game, which lasted 32 hours. It was set up by Ms. Glubbil. The game was held in 2005 then the tape was sent to United Kingdom. The record was officially recognized in March 2006, which has since been superseded by the 2014 Philippine Basketball Marathon.

== Notable alumni ==
Name	Graduating year	Known for
Curtis McKenzie	2008	Selected by the Dallas Stars in the 6th round (159th overall) of the 2009 NHL entry draft. He is currently under contract with the Texas Stars of the American Hockey League (AHL). He previously played for the Chicago Wolves (AHL) while under contract with the Vegas Golden Knights (NHL) as well as the Utica Comets (AHL) while under contract with the St. Louis Blues (NHL).
Kevin Moon	2016	Member and main vocalist of K-pop boy band THE BOYZ

== Awards ==
This school has received many awards over the years, many of them environmental, as a result have also resulted in the school receiving:

- 2001: Award of Merit (Canadian Consulting Engineering Association Building Engineering Excellence)

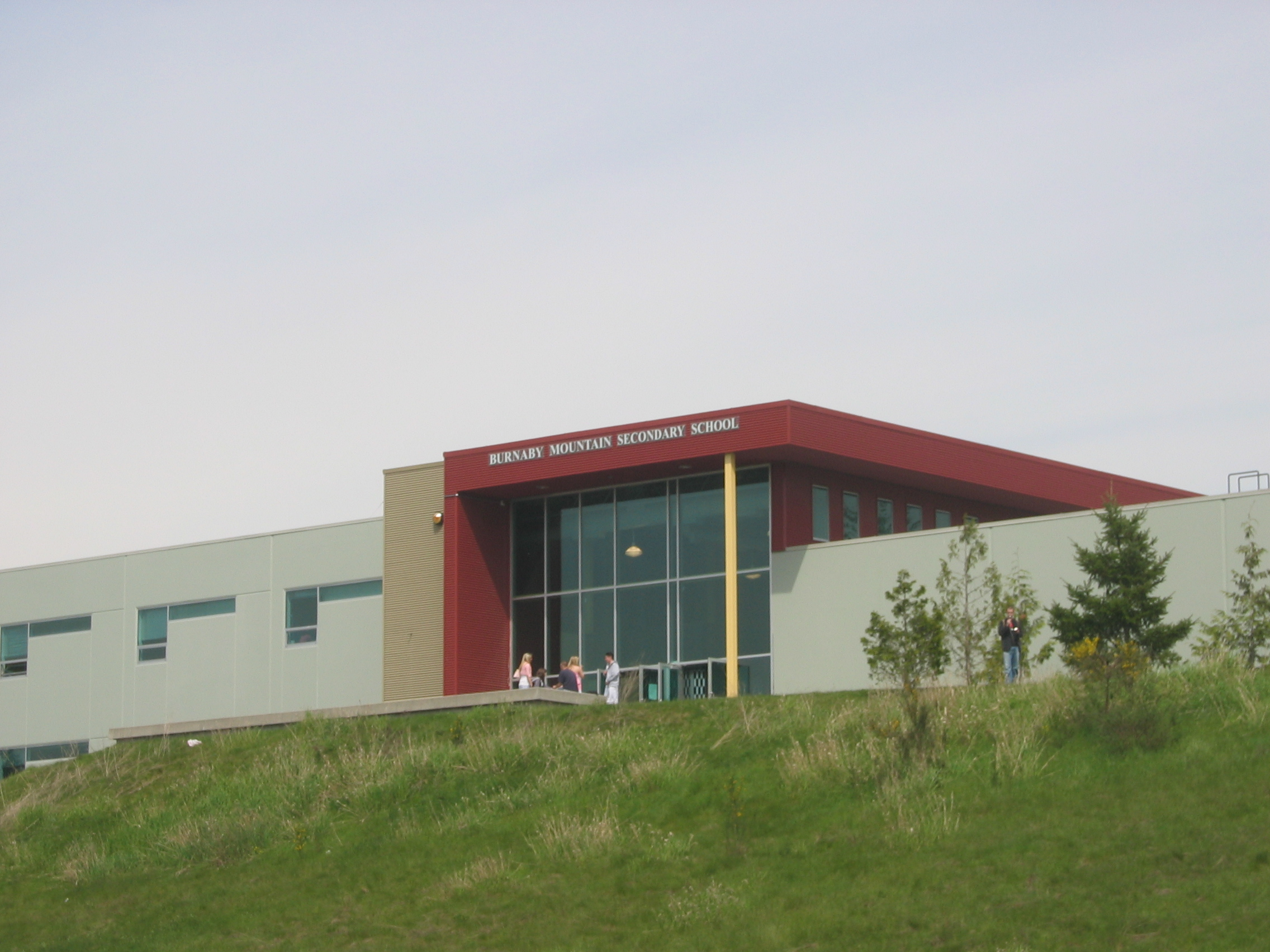
Another view of the school, from Gaglardi Way.
