= Wanshou Lu station =

Beijing Subway station

Wanshou Lu 万寿路
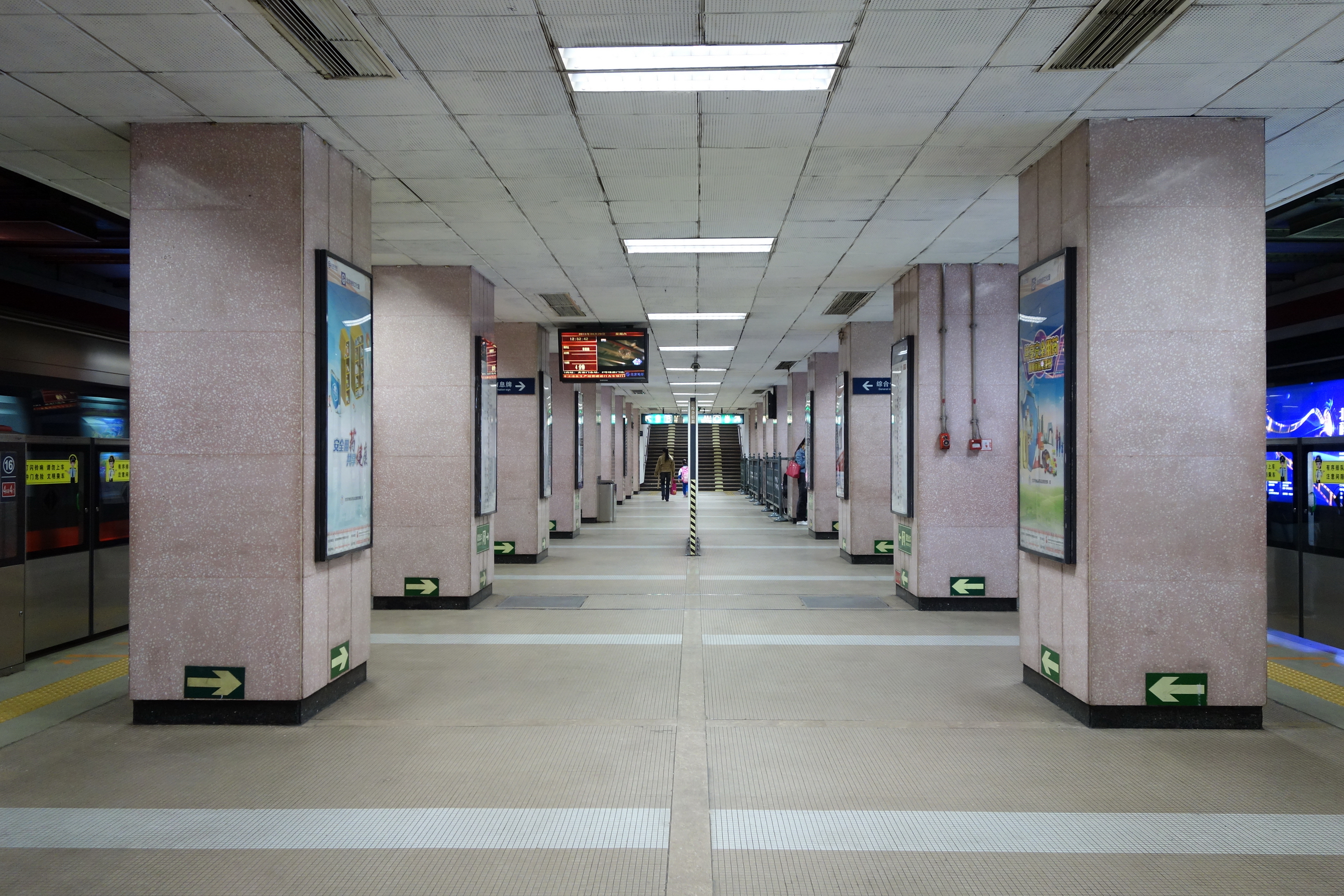
- Platform

General information
- Location: Fuxing Road and Wanshou Road; Haidian District, Beijing; China
- Coordinates: 39°54′27″N 116°17′41″E
- Operator: Beijing Mass Transit Railway Operation Corporation Limited
- Line: Line 1
- Platforms: 2 (1 island platform)
- Tracks: 2

Construction
- Structure type: Underground
- Accessible: Yes

Other information
- Station code: 109

History
- Opened: August 5, 1971; 55 years ago

Services
Preceding station	Beijing Subway	Following station
Wukesong towards Pingguoyuan	Line 1	Gongzhufen towards Universal Resort
Location
- Location within Beijing

Wanshou Lu station (simplified Chinese: 万寿路站; traditional Chinese: 萬壽路站; pinyin: Wànshòu Lù zhàn; lit. 'Wanshou Road station') is a station on Line 1 of the Beijing Subway.

== Station layout ==
The station has an underground island platform.

== Exits ==
The station has eight exits, numbered A1, A2, B1, B2, C1, C2, D1, and D2. Exit D1 is accessible.

== Gallery ==
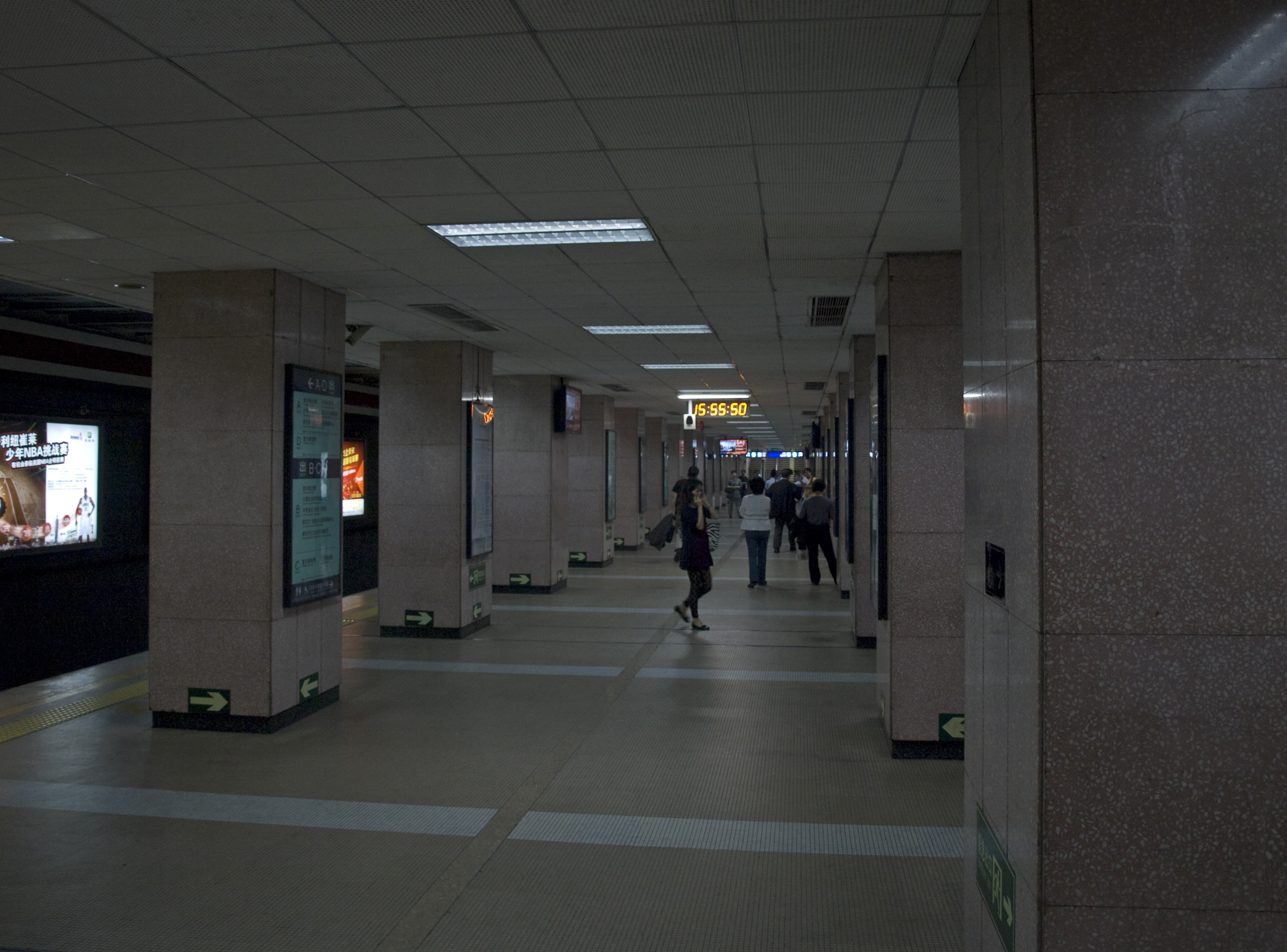
Station platform, before the safety door was installed

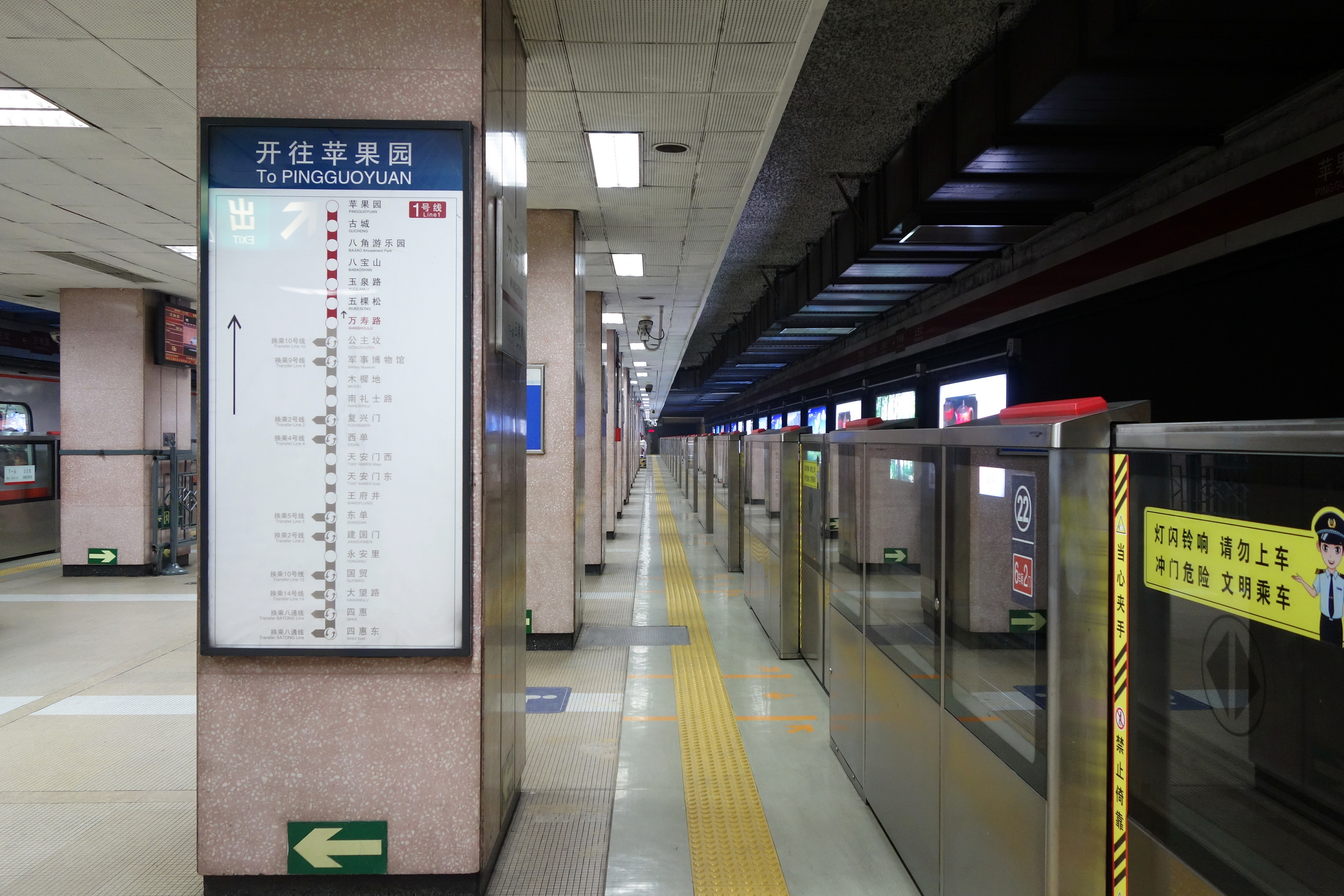
In 2017, Safety door was installed on the platform

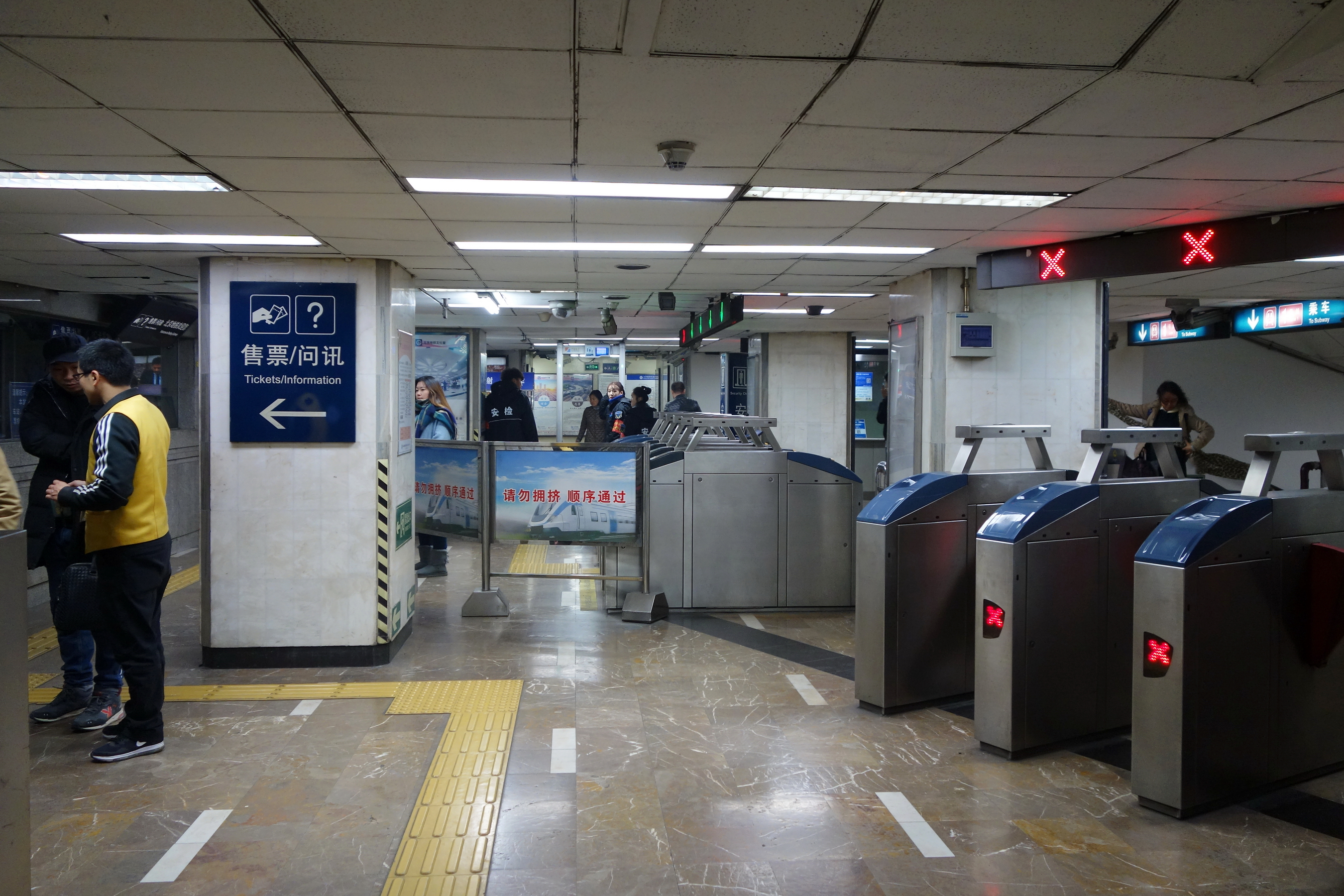
Station Hall
