= Wukesong =

Coordinates: 39.9135°N 116.2787°E

Wukesong (Chinese: 五棵松; pinyin: wǔkēsōng), literally the "Five Pine Trees", is the name of the roadway interchange in Haidian District in western Beijing where Fuxing Road, the western extension of Chang'an Avenue crosses the Fourth Ring Road. In the 1960s, five pine trees stood at the site during the construction of the Beijing Subway. The trees died but five new pines have been planted. Line 1's Wukesong Station has exits at each of the four corners of the interchange. The Beijing Wukesong Culture & Sports Center is situated northeast of the intersection.
