= 2017 FIBA 3x3 World Tour – Saskatoon Masters =

The 2017 FIBA 3x3 World Tour Saskatoon Masters was a 3x3 basketball tournament held in Saskatoon, Saskatchewan, Canada at a temporary venue constructed at the intersections of 4th Avenue and 21st Street from July 15–16, 2017. It was the first stop on the 2017 FIBA 3x3 World Tour. The top team, Ljubljana qualified for the 2017 FIBA 3x3 World Tour Final.

== Participants ==
12 teams qualified to participate at the Saskatoon Masters. The United Arab Emirates' team Novi Sad Al-Wahda qualified but later withdrew from the tournament due to visa issues and was replaced by the Czech Team Humpolec. As well, Team Manta from Ecuador also was forced to withdraw due to visa issues and Team Hamilton from Canada replaced them.

Event	Date	Location	Berths	Qualified
Final del Tour Nacional 3x3	February 19, 2017	(Puerto Rico) Arecibo	1	(Puerto Rico) Team Gurabo
USA 3x3 Basketball National Quest	April 9, 2017	(United States) Colorado Springs, Colorado	1	(United States) Team Princeton
Shopping Metro Tatuapé 3x3	May 21, 2017	(Brazil) São Paulo	1	(Brazil) Team Rio de Janeiro
Club Triple E	June 18, 2017	(Ecuador) Manta	0	~~(Ecuador) Team Manta~~
NYC 3x3 Battle Finale	June 9–10, 2017	(United States) New York City, New York	1	(United States) Team NYC Harlem
Cedevita Lipik 3x3 Challenger 2017	June 30-July 1, 2017	(Croatia) Lipik	2	~~(United Arab Emirates) Team Novi Sad Al-Wahda~~ (Serbia) Team Lipik (Czech Republic) Team Humpolec
3x3 Canada Quest 2017 Finals	July 8–9, 2017	(Canada) Edmonton, Alberta	2+1	(Canada) Team Montreal (Canada) Team Winnipeg (Canada) Team Hamilton
Hard Seeded Qualifiers	N/A	N/A	2	(Slovenia) Team Ljubljana (Japan) Team Hamamatsu
Wildcard Qualifier	N/A	N/A	1	(Canada) Team Saskatoon
TOTAL			12	

== Preliminary round ==
=== Pool A ===
Qualified for Quarterfinals

Team	Pld	W	L	PF	PA	PD	Pts
(Slovenia) Ljubljana	2	2	0	33	22	+11	4
(United States) Princeton	2	1	1	32	29	+3	3
(Brazil) Rio de Janeiro	2	0	2	23	36	−13	2

July 15, 2017
Ljubljana (Slovenia)	17–11	(United States) Princeton
Rio de Janeiro (Brazil)	12–21	(United States) Princeton
Ljubljana (Slovenia)	15–11	(Brazil) Rio de Janeiro

=== Pool B ===
Qualified for Quarterfinals

Team	Pld	W	L	PF	PA	PD	Pts
(Canada) Saskatoon	2	2	0	29	24	+5	4
(Canada) Hamilton	2	1	1	25	24	+1	3
(Canada) Winnipeg	2	0	2	21	27	−6	2

July 15, 2017
Saskatoon (Canada)	15–11	(Canada) Winnipeg
Hamilton (Canada)	12–10	(Canada) Winnipeg
Saskatoon (Canada)	14–13	(Canada) Hamilton

=== Pool C ===
Qualified for Quarterfinals

Team	Pld	W	L	PF	PA	PD	Pts
(Serbia) Liman	2	2	0	42	33	+9	4
(United States) NYC Harlem	2	1	1	35	32	+3	3
(Canada) Montreal	2	0	2	27	39	−12	2

July 15, 2017
Liman (Serbia)	21–16	(Canada) Montreal
NYC Harlem (United States)	18–11	(Canada) Montreal
Liman (Serbia)	21–17	(United States) NYC Harlem

=== Pool D ===
Qualified for Quarterfinals

Team	Pld	W	L	PF	PA	PD	Pts
(Puerto Rico) Gurabo	2	2	0	33	27	+6	4
(Czech Republic) Humpolec	2	1	1	32	31	+1	3
(Japan) Hamamatsu	2	0	2	31	38	−7	2

July 15, 2017
Hamamatsu (Japan)	14–19	(Puerto Rico) Gurabo
Humpolec (Czech Republic)	13–14	(Puerto Rico) Gurabo
Hamamatsu (Japan)	17–19	(Czech Republic) Humpolec

== Final Round ==
Quarterfinal
July 16
(Slovenia) Ljubljana	18
(Czech Republic) Humpolec	11
July 16
(Serbia) Liman	12
(Canada) Hamilton	15
July 16
(Canada) Saskatoon	17
(United States) NYC Harlem	15
July 16
(Puerto Rico) Gurabo	16
(United States) Princeton	14

Semi-Finals
July 16
(Slovenia) Ljubljana	19
(Canada) Hamilton	17
July 16
(Canada) Saskatoon	21
(Puerto Rico) Gurabo	10

Final
July 16
(Slovenia) Ljubljana	21
(Canada) Saskatoon	14

== Final standings ==
Qualified for the 2017 FIBA 3x3 World Tour Finals

Rank	Team	Record
1st place, gold medalist(s)	(Slovenia) Ljubljana	5–0
2nd place, silver medalist(s)	(Canada) Saskatoon	4–1
3rd place, bronze medalist(s)	(Puerto Rico) Gurabo	3–1
4	(Canada) Hamilton	3–1
5	(Serbia) Liman	2–1
6	(United States) NYC Harlem	1–2
7	(United States) Princeton	1–2
8	(Czech Republic) Humpolec	1–2
9	(Japan) Hamamatsu	0–2
10	(Canada) Montreal	0–2
11	(Brazil) Rio de Janeiro	0–2
12	(Canada) Winnipeg	0–2
