= Ljubljana (3x3 team) =

3x3 Ljubljana – Brezovica
- Leagues: FIBA 3x3 World Tour
- Founded: 2013; 12 years ago
- History: Brezovica (2013); Ljubljana (2014–present)
- Location: Ljubljana, Slovenia
- Championships: 2 World Tours

3x3 Ljubljana – Brezovica is a professional 3x3 basketball club based in Ljubljana, Slovenia. The team plays in the FIBA 3x3 World Tour. In 2013, the club was based in Brezovica, near Ljubljana.

== Players ==
=== Current roster ===
3x3 Ljubljana – Brezovica roster
Players
Coaches

Pos.	No.	Nat.	Name	Ht.	Wt.	Age
G	4	(Bosnia and Herzegovina)	Hercegovac, Jasmin	1.90 m (6 ft 3 in)	96 kg (212 lb)	47 – 3 July 1977
F	5	(Slovenia)	Kunc, Aleš	2.07 m (6 ft 9 in)	100 kg (220 lb)	51 – 13 July 1973
G/F	6	(Slovenia)	Čajič, Tomo	2.00 m (6 ft 7 in)	102 kg (225 lb)	39 – 20 August 1985
C	7	(Slovenia)	Črešnar, Blaž	2.16 m (7 ft 1 in)	107 kg (236 lb)	38 – 14 July 1986

Head coach

N/A

Legend

- (C) Team captain
- Injured

=== Winning rosters ===
2016 Tour

- Jasmin Hercegovac, Aleš Kunc, Tomo Čajič, Blaž Črešnar

2013 Tour

- Rok Smaka, Jasmin Hercegovac, Aleš Kunc, Blaž Črešnar

== Season by season ==
Season	Qualification	Pos.	Finals	FR	Ref.
2013	Lausanne Masters	Q	Winner	6–0	
2014	Lausanne Masters	DNQ	—		
2015	Beijing Masters	Q	5th place	2–1	
2016	Prague Masters	Q	Winner	5–0	
2017	Saskatoon Masters	Q			

== Trophies and awards ==
=== Trophies ===
- FIBA 3x3 World Tour: (2)
  - 2013, 2016

=== Individual awards ===
FIBA 3x3 World Tour MVP

- Jasmin Hercegovac – 2016
