= Wukesong station =

Beijing Subway station

Wukesong 五棵松
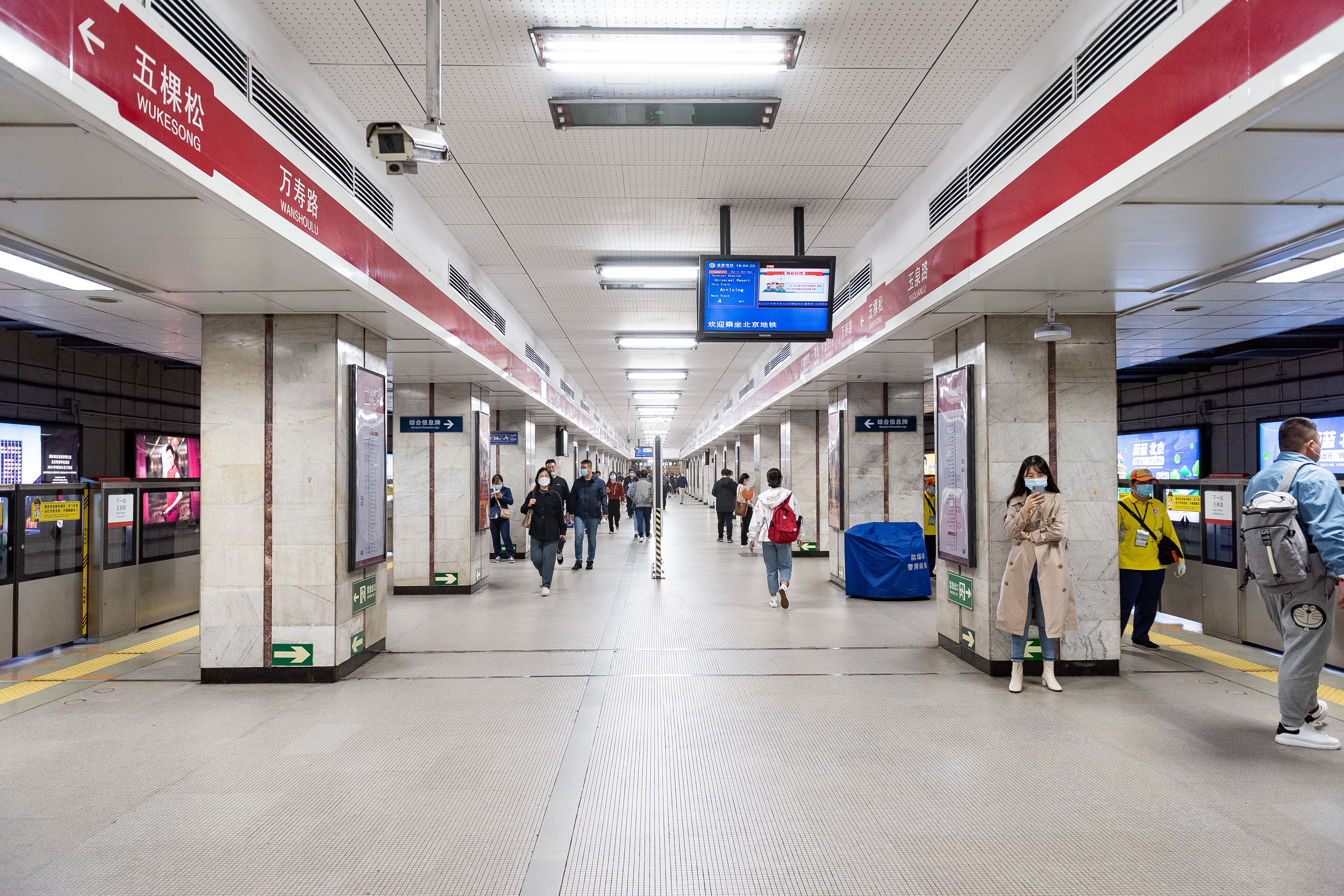
- Platform

General information
- Location: Fuxing Road and West 4th Ring Road Middle; Haidian District, Beijing; China
- Coordinates: 39°54′27″N 116°16′26″E
- Operator: Beijing Mass Transit Railway Operation Corporation Limited
- Line: Line 1
- Platforms: 2 (1 island platform)
- Tracks: 2

Construction
- Structure type: Underground
- Accessible: Yes

Other information
- Station code: 108

History
- Opened: August 5, 1971; 55 years ago

Services
Preceding station	Beijing Subway	Following station
Yuquan Lu towards Pingguoyuan	Line 1	Wanshou Lu towards Universal Resort
Location
- Location within Beijing

Wukesong Station (Chinese: 五棵松站; pinyin: Wǔkēsōng Zhàn) is a station on Line 1 of the Beijing Subway. Its northeast exit (B1) exits into the Huaxi Live entertainment complex.

== Station layout ==
The station has an underground island platform.

== Exits ==
The station has eight exits, lettered A1, A2, B1, B2, C1, C2, D1, D2. Exit D1 is accessible.

== Gallery ==
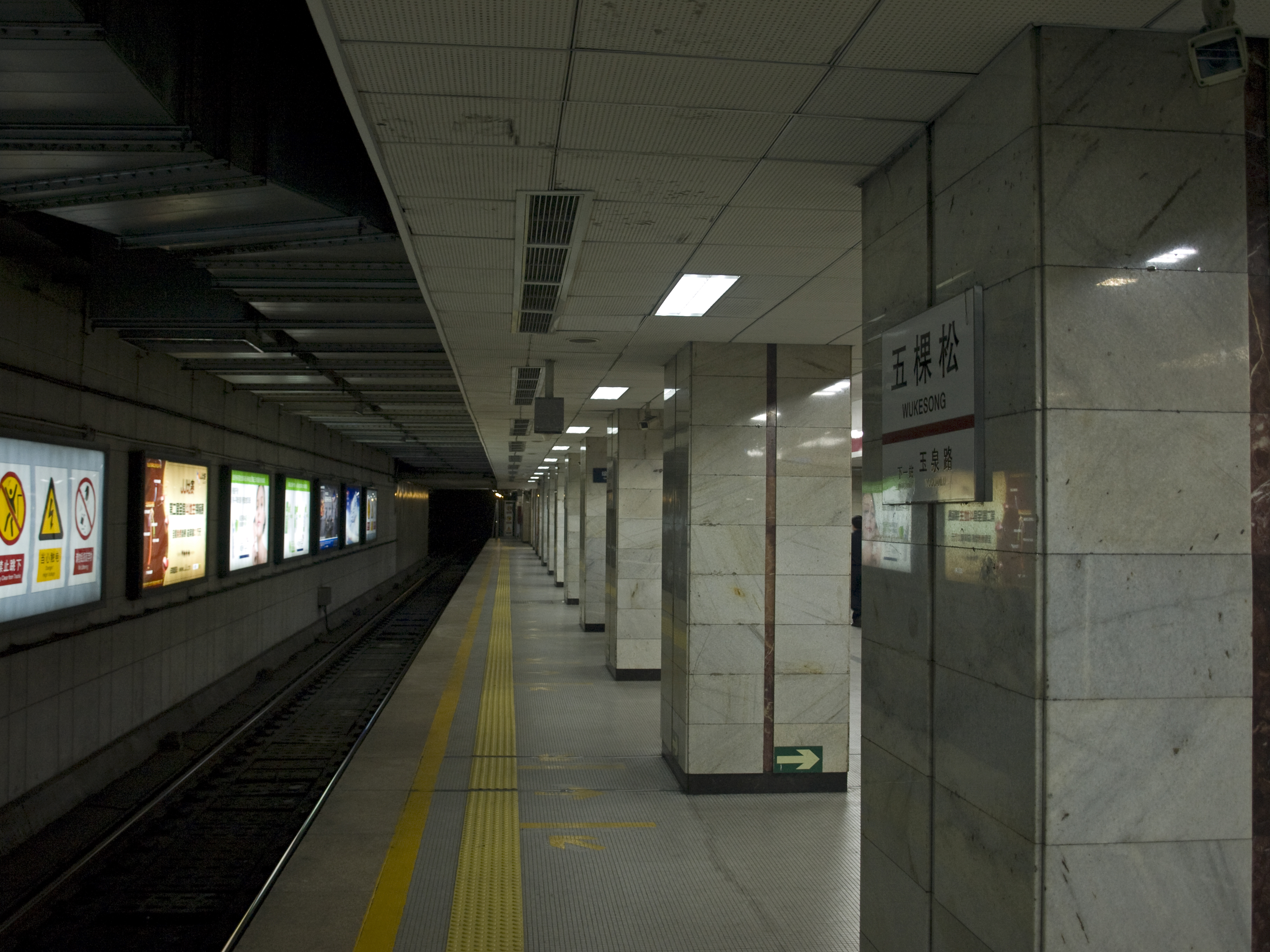
Station platform

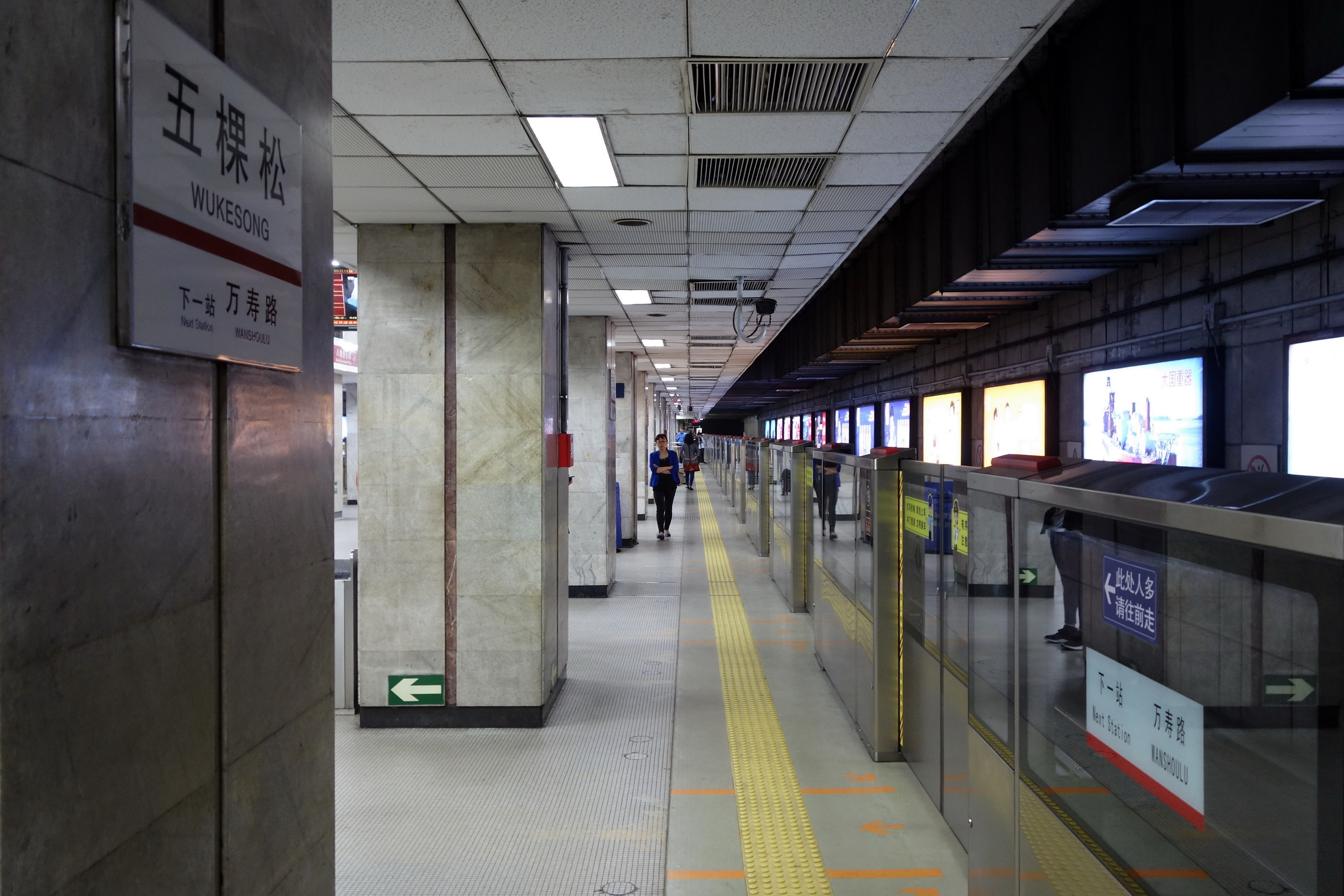
In 2017, Safety door was installed on the platform

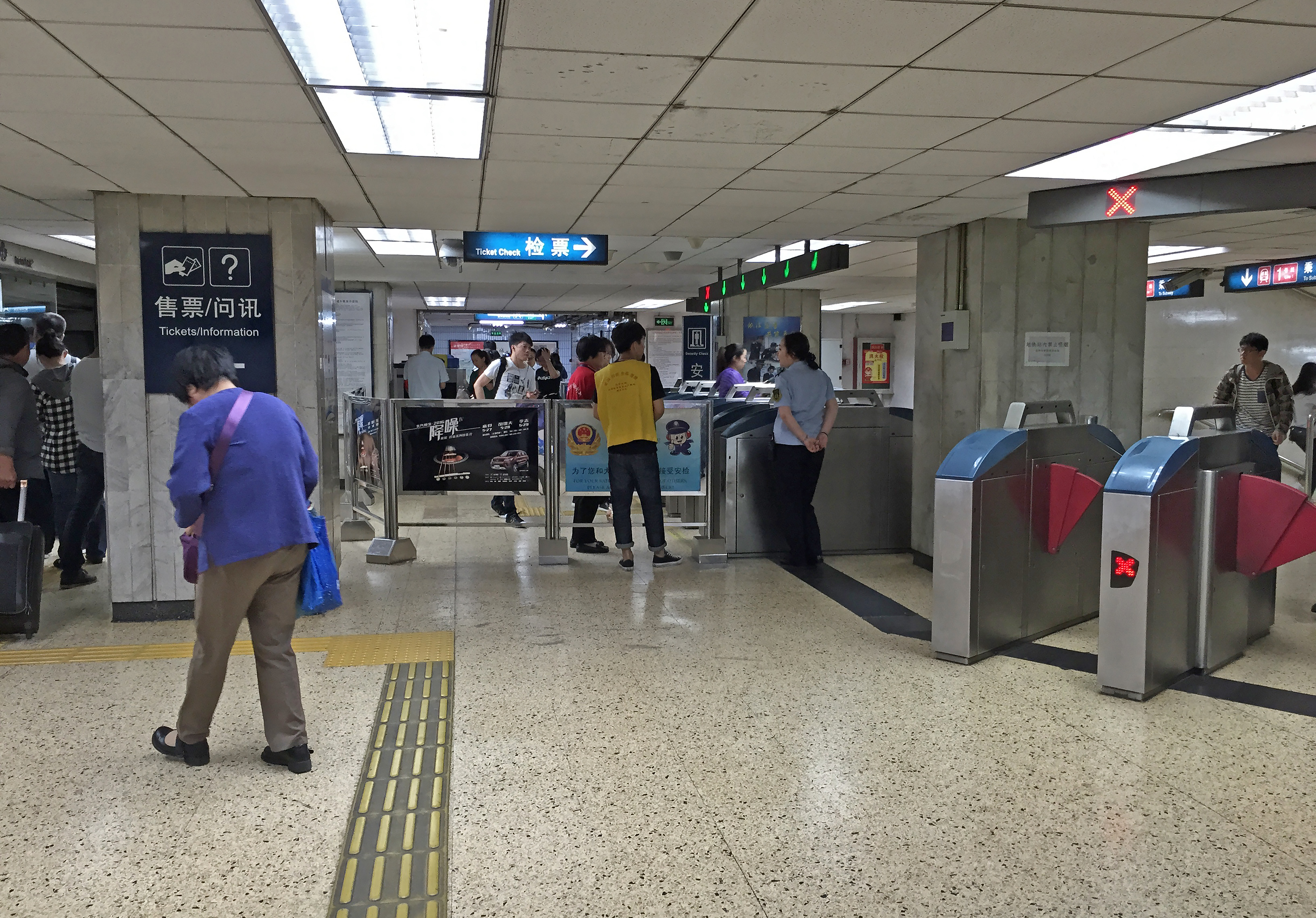
Station Hall
