= 2014 Philippine Basketball Marathon =

Guinness World Record match

Bounce Back	Walang Iwanan
16,783	16,732
- Date: March 24–29, 2014
- Venue: Meralco Gym, Pasig
- Coaches: Johnedel Cardel (Walang Iwanan); Louie Gonzales (Bounce Back)
- Referees: 40 referees

The 2014 Philippine Basketball Marathon was the longest basketball match played according to the Guinness World Records from 2014 to 2021. The basketball game which was contested by Team Walang Iwanan and Team Bounce Back took place from March 24 to 29, 2014 at the Meralco Gym in Metro Manila. The match had a duration of 120 hours, one minute and 7.8 seconds. The marathon was a fund raising event to provide housing in an area in Negros Occidental which was devastated from Typhoon Haiyan (Yolanda). The marathon broke the record set at the Missouri Athletic Club which took place in St. Louis, Missouri, on March 21–25, 2012 with the game duration of 112 hours and 13 seconds.

The World's Longest Basketball Game held from August 6 to 11, 2021, which doubles as a charity event for Western New York mental health organizations, surpassed the record set by the Philippine basketball game.

== Background ==
The Philippine Basketball Marathon was a Guinness world record attempt to beat the record set at the Missouri Athletic Club which took place in St. Louis, Missouri, from March 21–25, 2012 with the game duration of 112 hours and 13 seconds.

The Missouri match was between Team Joplin and Team St. Louis with the game ending 11,588–11,506 in favor of Team Joplin. Guinness laid provisions that 24 players in two teams were to participate in the Missouri attempt. Six players from each team played while six either rested, ate or receive medical attention.

The Philippine attempt also doubled as a charity event since it was also held as part of the "Bounce Back Phl" project which aimed to raise funds to construct a Basketball Marathon (BM) Village in an area in Negros Occidental which was left devastated following the aftermath of Typhoon Haiyan (Yolanda). The funds raised will be transferred to the "Operation Walang Iwanan" (lit. 'Operation No One Is Left Behind') project of Gawad Kalinga for this purpose. The BM Village will contain 24 houses, a basketball court and a community hall where the beneficiaries of the project may participate in livelihood programs of the charity organization. Construction of the village was scheduled in mid-2014. Gawad Kalinga also partnered with Asian Cable Enterprises, Inc. to organize the match.

Similarly, the Missouri match was a fundraiser for the recovery process following the aftermath of the 2011 Joplin tornado. More than $100,000 was raised which was distributed by the Joplin Area Chamber of Commerce.

== Preparation ==
=== Roster selection ===
In 2013, 300,000 online applicants vied to be included in the two teams of the 2014 Philippine Basketball Marathon. From these, 100 were shortlisted. The 100 were evaluated by coaches on their basketball playing skills and overall fitness and 30 players were selected for another shortlist of 30 players. 24 players were then selected for the final 24. All in all the selection process included two try outs, extensive medical test and a panel interview held within two days.

Head coach Johnedel Cardel who leads the basketball team of the Rizal Technological University remarked that a mix of young and more mature teams for the final 24 was deliberate and said that the basketball match was less than physical endurance and more on mental toughness and perseverance.

The selected players passed a series of medical tests and doctor consultations at The Medical City to ensure that they have the capability to play basketball for more than 112 hours.

=== Training ===
The players involved in the match underwent training and physical conditioning at the Rizal Technological University. The focus of the training was to enhance the players' stamina by developing their legs and lower back. To build the players' endurance, the coaches introduced cardio workouts, plyometics, and physical conditioning exercises and routines from football. The players also had a high-protein diet.

=== Match day ===
Doctors and three ambulances were deployed in standby as a precautionary measure during the game.

== Format ==
The match was played under FIBA rules. There were no time outs and halftime break. Fouls of all players reverts to 0 every 2 hours.

Guinness has set guidelines that players should "play within the spirit of the rules of the sport" and are not leave the court in the entire duration of the match.

== Match details ==
The match tip off was scheduled at 07:00 PST but the game started at some hours later than initially planned at 09:00. Pasig Mayor Bobby Eusebio and Samahang Basketball ng Pilipinas executive director Sonny Barrios were invited to kick off the event.

March 24–29, 2014
09:00

Team Walang Iwanan	16,732–16,783	Team Bounce Back

Meralco Gym, Pasig

Walang Iwanan	Bounce Back

Walang Iwanan roster
Players	Age	Height	Nickname (Note: The nicknames of the players as displayed on the home page of the 2014 Philippine Basketball Marathon, which shows the final 24 players for Teams Walang Iwanan and Bounce Back (12 players each). The players name, age and height are not listed in this source. But an earlier source material by the organizers of the event showing the 30 player shortlist for the match. Chuck Williams previously goes by the nickname "CoCo La FaTain" as attested in the earlier source.)
Sandy Canel	20	6 ft 3 in (1.91 m)	Bohol
Paul Michael dela Peña	24	6 ft 1 in (1.85 m)	Dels
Robie Dell Macatbag	27	5 ft 11 in (1.80 m)	CDK
Hazel Foja	28	5 ft 9 in (1.75 m)	Romblon
Adine Rome Santos (Note: The identity of the players identified as "Kopo", "Din" and "Kotkot" was not retrieved, although a report by the Philippine Star says that Adin Rome Santos, Renell Montecillo, and Jopet Quiro also participated in the basketball match who were not listed in the 30-player shortlist. Santos was identified to have played for Team Bounce Back. No source has been retrieved if the players used any of the three aliases.)	—N/a		
Owen Mabaga	29	5 ft 9 in (1.75 m)	Engineer
Luis Jay Volante	21	5 ft 5 in (1.65 m)	Baki
Harold Lomtong	20	5 ft 7 in (1.70 m)	Haio
Evan Lazana	43	5 ft 11 in (1.80 m)	Bidoy
Abraham Compuesto III	19	6 ft 0 in (1.83 m)	AC
Jeffrey Moore (Note: There were three American nationals who participated in the game, Moore, Tater, and Williams. All three were participants of the 2012 Missouri Athletic Club game which were the previous holders of the world record which this game successfully broke.)	47	5 ft 9 in (1.75 m)	J Mo
Tony Tater	45	6 ft 1 in (1.85 m)	Tatertot
Head coach: Johnedel Cardel

Bounce Back roster
Players	Age	Height	Nickname
Larry Macapanpan	43	5 ft 6 in (1.68 m)	Doc
Helino Francisco Jr.	24	6 ft 1 in (1.85 m)	D Mole
Kerr Bangeles	22	5 ft 10 in (1.78 m)	Kerr
Renell Montecillo	—N/a		
John Ray Mapala	22	5 ft 9 in (1.75 m)	JhayQuick
Jopet Quiro	—N/a		
Justo Quita Jr.	23	5 ft 9 in (1.75 m)	Batang
Rober Clark Bear	20	6 ft 1 in (1.85 m)	Papa Bear
Maricar Convencido (Note: Not all participants were male, Convencido is the sole female participant in the game. She is a Physical Education instructor and basketball coach)	29	5 ft 3 in (1.60 m)	Riki
Santos Tominio	20	5 ft 8 in (1.73 m)	Esjey
Chuck Williams	48	6 ft 0 in (1.83 m)	C-Dub
Carlo Ferdinand Vasquez	28	5 ft 7 in (1.70 m)	Grummann
Head coach: Louie Gonzales

== Aftermath ==
The game that began around 09:00 PST on March 24 ended around the same time on March 29. By around 1:00 am on March 29, the world record set at the Missouri Athletics Club was broken. The whole game's duration was 120 hours, one minute and 7.8 seconds.

=== Verification by Guinness ===
Following the end of the game, Guinness didn't immediately recognize the world record accomplished by the basketball match and underwent a review by a Guinness adjudicator to determine if there were violations to the provisions laid by the world record organization.

Access Discovery Channel reported that Guinness wouldn't recognize the feat immediately due to technical reasons. Jacque Ruby, chief operating officer of the organization cited two guidelines which states that participants “have to play within the spirit of the rules of the sport” and the other is the prohibition of players from leaving the court. Ruby noted that during the "graveyard shift" players are "not running anymore, stays at the other end and just waits for the ball" which he states that "it's not an actual game anymore." He also noted that players also occasionally went to the toilet which is located outside the court.

The guidelines set by Guinness were reportedly strict compared to those set by The Missouri Athletic Club. In which a smaller board was used and there was no 24-second shot clock. The Missouri Athletic Club attempt was not recorded on videotape in whole and players were allowed to play barefoot.

On March 30, 2014, radio station DZBB-AM reported that Guinness has officially recognized the new world record set by the Philippine Basketball Marathon.

=== Recognition ===
House Resolution 01487 was adopted in the Philippine House of Representatives on September 10, 2014, to congratulate and commend the two teams, along with the Samahang Basketball ng Pilipinas organizing committee for the world record feat. The resolution was authored by Eric Olivares and Anthony Del Rosario of the Committee on Youth and Sports Development. The Philippine Basketball Marathon received a citation at the 2015 PSA Annual Awards.

=== New record ===
The World Longest Basketball Game, a charity event for Western New York mental health organization, was held from August 6 to 11, 2021. Following its conclusion, the basketball game was recognized as the longest by the Guinness World Records.
