= Blaž Črešnar =

Slovenian basketball player

Personal information
- Born: 14 July 1986 (age 40) Maribor, SFR Yugoslavia
- Listed height: 2.16 m (7 ft 1 in)

Career information
- NBA draft: 2008: undrafted
- Playing career: 2001–2022
- Position: Center

Career history
- 2001–2002: Murska Sobota
- 2002–2005: Triglav Kranj
- 2005–2006: Olimpija
- 2005–2006: →Postojna
- 2006–2008: Zaragoza
- 2008–2009: Šenčur
- 2009: Lugano Tigers
- 2009–2010: Valmiera
- 2010–2011: Nevėžis
- 2011–2012: Helios
- 2012–2013: Fürstenfeld Panthers
- 2014: Trakai
- 2014–2015: UBSC Graz
- 2015: Maribor
- 2015–2017: Caorle
- 2017–2020: Murano
- 2020–2022: Pordenone
Medals
Men's 3x3 basketball
Representing Slovenia
FIBA Europe 3x3 Championships
Silver medal – second place	2014 Bucharest	Team

Blaž Črešnar (born 14 July 1986, in Maribor, SFR Yugoslavia) is a Slovenian professional basketball player. He is a 216 cm (7 ft 1 in) tall center.
