= 2014 FIBA 3x3 World Tour Manila Masters =

The 2014 FIBA 3x3 World Tour Manila Masters was a 3x3 basketball tournament held in Mandaluyong, Metro Manila, Philippines at the SM Megamall from 19–20 July 2014. The top two best teams, Doha and Manila West qualified for the 2014 FIBA 3x3 World Tour Final.

== Participants ==
12 teams qualified to participate at the Manila Masters. India's team Team Bangalore J.U. qualified but later withdrew from the tournament. Team Medan, fourth-place winner of the Indonesian qualifiers replaced Team Bangalore.

Event	Date	Location	Berths	Qualified
NBA Jam India	12–30 September 2013	(India) Mumbai	0	~~Team Bangalore J.U.~~*
3X3 Clubs Tournament	14 December 2013	(Qatar) Doha	1	Team Doha
3X3 Tournament EXE Kobe	25 May 2014	(Japan) Kobe	1	Team Kobe
There's a Better Way Foundation Quest	30 November 2013 - 13 June 2014	(New Zealand) Auckland	1	Team Auckland
Perbasi 3x3 Indonesia Tour 2014	31 May - 29 June 2014	(Indonesia) Jakarta	3+1	Team Surabaya; Team Jakarta; Team Yogyakarta; Team Medan
UBA Quest	14–29 June 2014	(Taiwan) Xinzhuang	1	Team Xinzhuang
SBP 3x3 Tatluhan	10–11 July 2014	(Philippines) Pasig	4	Team Manila North; Team Manila East; Team Manila South; Team Manila West
TOTAL			12	

== Preliminary round ==
=== Pool A ===
Qualified for Quarterfinals

Team	Pld	W	L	PF	PA	PD	Pts
(Indonesia) Jakarta	2	2	0	34	24	+10	4
(Philippines) Manila South	2	1	1	29	34	−5	3
(Indonesia) Medan	2	0	2	25	30	−5	2

19 July 2014
Jakarta (Indonesia)	13–12	(Indonesia) Medan
Medan (Indonesia)	13–17	(Philippines) Manila South
Manila South (Philippines)	12–21	(Indonesia) Jakarta

=== Pool B ===
Qualified for Quarterfinals

Team	Pld	W	L	PF	PA	PD	Pts
(Qatar) Doha	2	2	0	38	24	+14	4
(Philippines) Manila West	2	1	1	38	30	+8	3
(Japan) Kobe	2	0	2	16	38	−22	2

19 July 2014
Doha (Qatar)	17–7	(Japan) Kobe
Kobe (Japan)	9–21	(Philippines) Manila West
Manila West (Philippines)	17–21	(Qatar) Doha

=== Pool C ===
Qualified for Quarterfinals

Team	Pld	W	L	PF	PA	PD	Pts
(New Zealand) Auckland	2	2	0	36	24	+12	4
(Philippines) Manila North	2	1	1	32	27	+5	3
(Chinese Taipei) Xinzhuang	2	0	2	24	41	−17	2

19 July 2014
Auckland (New Zealand)	20–13	(Chinese Taipei) Xinzhuang
Xinzhuang (Chinese Taipei)	11–21	(Philippines) Manila North
Manila North (Philippines)	11–16	(New Zealand) Auckland

=== Pool D ===
Qualified for Quarterfinals

Team	Pld	W	L	PF	PA	PD	Pts
(Indonesia) Surabaya	2	2	0	28	25	+3	4
(Philippines) Manila East	2	1	1	29	27	+2	3
(Indonesia) Yogkayarta	2	0	2	23	30	−7	2

19 July 2014
Yogkayarta (Indonesia)	12–14	(Indonesia) Surabaya
Surabaya (Indonesia)	14–13	(Philippines) Manila East
Manila East (Philippines)	16–11	(Indonesia) Yogkayarta

== Final round ==
Quarterfinal
20 July
(Indonesia) Jakarta	15
(Philippines) Manila East	11
20 July
(New Zealand) Auckland	9
(Philippines) Manila West	14
20 July
(Qatar) Doha	21
(Philippines) Manila North	8
20 July
(Indonesia) Surabaya	21
(Philippines) Manila South	20

Semi-Finals
20 July
(Indonesia) Jakarta	14
(Philippines) Manila West	18
20 July
(Qatar) Doha	20
(Indonesia) Surabaya	15

Final
20 July
(Philippines) Manila West	21
(Qatar) Doha	17

== Final standings ==
Qualified for the 2014 FIBA 3x3 World Tour Finals

Rank	Team	Record
1st place, gold medalist(s)	(Philippines) Manila West	4–1
2nd place, silver medalist(s)	(Qatar) Doha	4–1
3rd place, bronze medalist(s)	(Indonesia) Surabaya	3–1
4	(Indonesia) Jakarta	3–1
5	(New Zealand) Auckland	2–1
6	(Philippines) Manila South	1–2
7	(Philippines) Manila North	1–2
8	(Philippines) Manila East	1–2
9	(Indonesia) Medan	0–2
10	(Chinese Taipei) Xinzhuang	0–2
11	(Indonesia) Yogyakarta	0–2
12	(Japan) Kobe	0–2
