= 2015 FIBA 3x3 World Tour =

FIBA 3x3 World Tour 2015
- Season: 2015
- Duration: August 1 – September 27, 2015 (Qualification); October 15–16, 2015 (Finals)
- Teams: 12 (finals)

Regular season
- Season MVP: (Serbia) Dušan Domović Bulut

Finals
- Champions: (United Arab Emirates) Novi Sad Al-Wahda (2nd title)
- Runners-up: (Slovenia) Kranj
- Semifinalists: (United States) New York Harlem

The 2015 FIBA 3x3 World Tour is the 4th season of the FIBA 3x3 World Tour, the highest professional 3x3 basketball competition in the World. The tournament is organized by FIBA.

The final tournament of the 2015 FIBA 3x3 World Tour was held in Abu Dhabi, United Arab Emirates on 15–16 October 2015. The best two teams from each Masters tournament were qualified to participate in the World Tour finals with the champions qualifying for a berth at the 2015 FIBA 3x3 All Stars, to be held in Doha, Qatar on 11 December 2015.

== Finals qualification ==
Six Masters Tournaments were held in six cities in six countries. 12 teams participate in the finals which is held in Abu Dhabi, UAE on October 15–16. Two best teams from each masters tournament qualified for the finals.

Event	Date	Location	Berths	Qualified
Manila Masters	1–2 August	(Philippines) Manila	2	(United Arab Emirates) Novi Sad Al-Wahda (Philippines) Manila North
Prague Masters	8–9 August	(Czech Republic) Prague	2	(Slovenia) Kranj (Poland) Kolobrzeg
Beijing Masters	15–16 August	(China) Beijing	2	(Qatar) Doha (Slovenia) Ljubljana
Lausanne Masters	28–29 August	(Switzerland) Lausanne	2	(Lithuania) Vilnius (Slovenia) Trbovlje
Mexico DF Masters	9–10 September	Mexico City	2	(United States) New York Harlem (United States) Denver
Rio de Janeiro Masters	26–27 September	(Brazil) Rio de Janeiro	2	(Brazil) Rio (Brazil) Santos
TOTAL			12	

== Group stage ==
=== Group A ===
Pos	Team	Pld	W	L	PF	PA	PD	Pts	Qualification
1	(United Arab Emirates) Novi Sad Al-Wahda	2	2	0	43	22	+21	4	Advanced to second round
2	(Brazil) Rio	2	1	1	28	40	−12	3	Advanced to second round
3	(Lithuania) Vilnius	2	0	2	32	41	−9	2	Eliminated

Source: FIBA

=== Group B ===
Pos	Team	Pld	W	L	PF	PA	PD	Pts	Qualification
1	(Slovenia) Ljubljana	2	2	0	34	24	+10	4	Advanced to second round
2	(United States) Denver	2	1	1	25	26	−1	3	Advanced to second round
3	(Brazil) Santos	2	0	2	18	27	−9	2	Eliminated

Source: FIBA

=== Group C ===
Pos	Team	Pld	W	L	PF	PA	PD	Pts	Qualification
1	(Slovenia) Trbovlje	2	1	1	38	33	+5	3	Advanced to second round
2	(United States) New York Harlem	2	1	1	35	35	0	3	Advanced to second round
3	(Poland) Kolobrzeg	2	1	1	28	33	−5	3	Eliminated

Source: FIBA

=== Group D ===
Pos	Team	Pld	W	L	PF	PA	PD	Pts	Qualification
1	(Slovenia) Kranj	2	1	1	33	33	0	3	Advanced to second round
2	(Philippines) Manila North	2	1	1	30	35	−5	3	Advanced to second round
3	(Qatar) Doha	2	1	1	34	29	+5	3	Eliminated

Source: FIBA

== Second round ==
Quarterfinals
A1	(United Arab Emirates) Novi Sad Al-Wahda	21
D2	(Philippines) Manila North	13
C1	(Slovenia) Trbovlje	22
B2	(United States) Denver	10
B1	(Slovenia) Ljubljana	21
C2	(United States) NY Harlem	22
D1	(Slovenia) Kranj	19
A2	(Brazil) Rio	16

Semifinals
(United Arab Emirates) Novi Sad Al-Wahda	16
(Slovenia) Trbovlje	14
(United States) NY Harlem	19
(Slovenia) Kranj	21

Finals
(United Arab Emirates) Novi Sad Al-Wahda	17
(Slovenia) Kranj	14

== Final standing ==
Qualified for the FIBA 3x3 All-Stars

Rank	Team	Record
1st place, gold medalist(s)	(United Arab Emirates) Novi Sad Al-Wahda	5-0
2nd place, silver medalist(s)	(Slovenia) Kranj	3-1
3rd place, bronze medalist(s)	(United States) New York Harlem	2-1
4	(Slovenia) Trbovlje	2-1
5	(Slovenia) Ljubljana	2-1
6	(Philippines) Manila North	1-2
7	(Brazil) Rio	1-2
8	(United States) Denver	1-2
9	(Qatar) Doha	1-2
10	(Poland) Kolobrzeg	1-2
11	(Lithuania) Vilnius	0-2
12	(Brazil) Santos	0-2

== Awards ==
- Most Valuable Player: (Serbia) Dušan Domović Bulut (Novi Sad Al-Wahda)

2015 FIBA 3x3 World Tour
(United Arab Emirates)
Novi Sad Al-Wahda
Second title
