= 2012 FIBA 3x3 World Tour =

Tournament information
- Host(s): Brazil; Russia; New York City; Turkey; Spain; Miami (finals)
- Teams: 13 (finals)

Final positions
- Champions: (Puerto Rico) Team San Juan (1st title)
- 1st runners-up: (Croatia) Split
- 2nd runners-up: (Canada) Edmonton

The 2012 FIBA 3x3 World Tour was an international 3x3 basketball between 3x3 basketball teams. The tournament is organized by FIBA.

== Finals qualification ==
Five Masters Tournaments were held in five cities in five countries. 12 teams participated in the finals which was held in Miami, Florida, USA on September 22–23. The best teams from each masters tournament qualified for the finals.

Event	Date	Location	Berths	Qualified
Hosts	22-23 September	(United States) Miami	1	(United States) Miami
São Paulo Masters	14–15 July	(Brazil) São Paulo	1	(Argentina) Neuquén
Vladivostok Masters	21–22 July	(Russia) Vladivostok	2	(Russia) Vladivostok (Russia) Khabarovsk
New York Masters	18–19 August	(United States) New York	4	(United States) Denver (Canada) Edmonton (Puerto Rico) San Juan (Russia) Moscow
Istanbul Masters	1–2 September	(Turkey) Istanbul	2	(Lithuania) Vilnius (Romania) Bucharest UPB
Madrid Masters	7–8 September	(Spain) Madrid	2	(Croatia) Split (Slovenia) Ljubljana
TOTAL			12	

== Final standing ==
Rank	Team	Record
1st place, gold medalist(s)	(Puerto Rico) Team San Juan	7–1
2nd place, silver medalist(s)	(Croatia) Split	5–2
3rd place, bronze medalist(s)	(Canada) Edmonton	5–1
4	(Slovenia) Ljubljana	4–3
5	(United States) Denver	3–3
6	(Romania) Bucharest UPB	3–3
7	(Lithuania) Vilnius	3–2
8	(United States) Miami	2–3
9	(Russia) Moscow	1–4
10	(Argentina) Neuquén	1–4
11	(Russia) Khabarovsk	1–4
12	(Russia) Vladivostok	0–5
