= 2017 FIBA 3x3 World Tour =

3x3 basketball competition season

FIBA 3x3 World Tour 2017
- Season: 2017
- Duration: July 15 – October 1, 2017 (Qualification); October 21–22, 2017 (Finals)
- Teams: 12 (finals)

Regular season
- Season MVP: (Serbia) Stefan Stojačić

Finals
- Champions: (Serbia) Zemun (1st title)
- Runners-up: (United Arab Emirates) Novi Sad Al-Wahda
- Semifinalists: (Slovenia) Piran (Latvia) Riga

The 2017 FIBA 3x3 World Tour is the 6th season of the FIBA 3x3 World Tour, the highest professional 3x3 basketball competition in the World. The tournament is organized by FIBA.

The World Tour Final was held in Beijing, China at the Bloomage Live Hi-Up shopping mall.

== Finals qualification ==
Seven Masters tournaments were held in seven different cities in seven different countries. The FIBA 3x3 World Tour Final was scheduled to be held in Beijing, China from October 21-22.

Event	Date	Location	Berths	Qualified
Saskatoon Masters	15–16 July	(Canada) Saskatoon	1	(Slovenia) Ljubljana
Utsunomiya Masters	29–30 July	(Japan) Utsunomiya	1	(United Arab Emirates) Novi Sad Al-Wahda
Prague Masters	5–6 August	(Czech Republic) Prague	N/A	N/A
Lausanne Masters	25–26 August	(Switzerland) Lausanne	N/A	N/A
Debrecen Masters	31 August – 1 September	(Hungary) Debrecen	1	(Serbia) Liman
Chengdu Masters	23–24 September	(China) Chengdu	1	(Slovenia) Piran
Mexico City Masters	30 September – 1 October	Mexico City	N/A	N/A
World Tour Season Standings			8	(Serbia) Zemun (4) (Latvia) Riga (6) (Serbia) Belgrade (7) (Slovenia) Kranj (8) (Poland) Krakow (9) (Switzerland) Lausanne (10) (Czech Republic) Humpolec (11) (Canada) Saskatoon (12)
TOTAL			12	

== Group A ==
Pos	Team	Pld	W	L	PF	PA	PD	Pts	Qualification
1	(United Arab Emirates) Novi Sad Al-Wahda	2	2	0	44	32	+12	4	Advanced to second round
2	(Slovenia) Kranj	2	1	1	26	21	+5	3	Advanced to second round
3	(Poland) Krakow	2	0	2	30	35	−5	2	Eliminated

Source: FIBA

== Group B ==
Pos	Team	Pld	W	L	PF	PA	PD	Pts	Qualification
1	(Slovenia) Ljubljana	2	2	0	36	29	+7	4	Advanced to second round
2	(Switzerland) Lausanne	2	1	1	31	34	−3	3	Advanced to second round
3	(Serbia) Belgrad	2	0	2	38	42	−4	2	Eliminated

Source: FIBA

== Group C ==
Pos	Team	Pld	W	L	PF	PA	PD	Pts	Qualification
1	(Latvia) Riga	2	1	1	39	38	+1	3	Advanced to second round
2	(Serbia) Liman	2	1	1	38	35	+3	3	Advanced to second round
3	(Czech Republic) Humpolec	2	1	1	35	39	−4	3	Eliminated

Source: FIBA

== Group D ==
Pos	Team	Pld	W	L	PF	PA	PD	Pts	Qualification
1	(Slovenia) Piran	2	1	1	35	26	+9	3	Advanced to second round
2	(Serbia) Zemun	2	1	1	28	34	−6	3	Advanced to second round
3	(Canada) Saskatoon	2	1	1	28	31	−3	3	Eliminated

Source: FIBA
