= 2016 FIBA 3x3 World Tour =

FIBA 3x3 World Tour 2016
- Season: 2016
- Duration: July 14 – September 25, 2016 (Qualification); October 27–28, 2016 (Finals)
- Teams: 12 (finals)

Regular season
- Season MVP: (Bosnia and Herzegovina) Jasmin Hercegovac

Finals
- Champions: (Slovenia) Ljubljana (2nd title)
- Runners-up: (Japan) Hamamatsu
- Semi-finalists: (Puerto Rico) Caguas (United Arab Emirates) Novi Sad Al-Wahda

The 2016 FIBA 3x3 World Tour is the 5th season of the FIBA 3x3 World Tour, the highest professional 3x3 basketball competition in the World. The tournament is organized by FIBA.

The World Tour Final was held in Abu Dhabi, United Arab Emirates at the International Tennis Complex of the Zayed Sports City. Team Ljubljana of Slovenia were the champions, who defeated Team Hamamatsu of Japan in the final.

== Finals qualification ==
Seven Masters tournaments were held in seven cities in seven countries. The finals were held in Abu Dhabi, United Arab Emirates. The best team from each stop qualified as well as the best teams in the overall ranking.

Event	Date	Location	Berths	Qualified
Mexico DF Masters	16–17 July	Mexico City	1	(Puerto Rico) Caguas
Utsunomiya Masters	30–31 July	(Japan) Utsunomiya	1	(United Arab Emirates) Novi Sad Al-Wahda
Prague Masters	6–7 August	(Czech Republic) Prague	1	(Slovenia) Ljubljana
Lausanne Masters	26–27 August	(Switzerland) Lausanne	1	(Canada) Saskatoon
Debrecen Masters	7–8 September	(Hungary) Debrecen	1	N/A
Beijing Masters	16–17 September	(China) Beijing	1	N/A
Americas Masters	24–25 September	Mexico City	1	(United States) Chicago
World Tour Season Standings			7	(Slovenia) Piran (3) (Slovenia) Kranj (5) (Poland) Gdansk (6) (Brazil) Sao Paulo (7) (Serbia) Belgrade (8) (Russia) St Petersburg (9) (Japan) Hamamatsu (11)
TOTAL			12	

== Group stage ==
=== Group A ===
Pos	Team	Pld	W	L	PF	PA	PD	Pts	Qualification
1	(United Arab Emirates) Novi Sad Al-Wahda	2	2	0	33	24	+9	4	Advanced to second round
2	(Serbia) Belgrade	2	1	1	24	25	−1	3	Advanced to second round
3	(Russia) St. Petersburg	2	0	2	18	26	−8	2	Eliminated

Source: FIBA

=== Group B ===
Pos	Team	Pld	W	L	PF	PA	PD	Pts	Qualification
1	(Slovenia) Ljubljana	2	2	0	39	34	+5	4	Advanced to second round
2	(United States) Chicago	2	1	1	37	34	+3	3	Advanced to second round
3	(Brazil) Sao Paulo DC	2	0	2	32	40	−8	2	Eliminated

Source: FIBA

=== Group C ===
Pos	Team	Pld	W	L	PF	PA	PD	Pts	Qualification
1	(Japan) Hamamatsu	2	2	0	40	30	+10	4	Advanced to second round
2	(Slovenia) Piran	2	1	1	39	32	+7	3	Advanced to second round
3	(Poland) Gdańsk	2	0	2	25	42	−17	2	Eliminated

Source: FIBA

=== Group D ===
Pos	Team	Pld	W	L	PF	PA	PD	Pts	Qualification
1	(Puerto Rico) Caguas	2	2	0	0	0	0	4	Advanced to second round
2	(Slovenia) Kranj	2	1	1	41	34	+7	3	Advanced to second round
3	(Canada) Saskatoon	2	0	2	26	42	−16	2	Eliminated

Source: FIBA

== Second round ==
Quarterfinals
A1	(United Arab Emirates) Novi Sad Al-Wahda	18
D2	(Slovenia) Kranj	13
C1	(Japan) Hamamatsu	21
B2	(United States) Chicago	16
B1	(Slovenia) Ljubljana	16
C2	(Slovenia) Piran	13
D1	(Puerto Rico) Caguas	21
A2	(Serbia) Belgrade	17

Semifinals
(United Arab Emirates) Novi Sad Al-Wahda	14
(Japan) Hamamatsu	21
(Slovenia) Ljubljana	22
(Puerto Rico) Caguas	15

Finals
(Japan) Hamamatsu	12
(Slovenia) Ljubljana	21

== Final standing ==
Rank	Team	Record
1st place, gold medalist(s)	(Slovenia) Ljubljana	5-0
2nd place, silver medalist(s)	(Japan) Hamamatsu	4-1
3rd place, bronze medalist(s)	(Puerto Rico) Caguas	3-1
4	(United Arab Emirates) Novi Sad Al-Wahda	3-1
5	(Slovenia) Kranj	1-2
6	(United States) Chicago	1-2
7	(Slovenia) Piran	1-2
8	(Serbia) Belgrade	1-2
9	(Brazil) Sao Paulo DC	0-2
10	(Canada) Saskatoon	0-2
11	(Poland) Gdańsk	0-2
12	(Russia) St. Petersburg	0-2
