= FIBA 3x3 World Tour =

- Founded: 2012; 14 years ago
- First season: 2012
- Confederation: FIBA
- Number of teams: 12
- Current champions: (Serbia) Ub (3rd title) (2025)
- Most championships: (Serbia) Novi Sad (5 titles)
- Website: worldtour.fiba3x3.com

The FIBA 3x3 World Tour is an international tour of men's 3x3 basketball teams representing cities. The tournament is organized by FIBA. The FIBA 3x3 Pro Series was launched in 2019.

== Qualification ==
The FIBA 3x3 Men's Pro Circuit refers to the system or network of FIBA-sanctioned men's 3x3 competitions for city-based professional teams. The pro circuit includes the FIBA 3x3 World Tour itself, as well as challenger and quest competitions which serves as World Tour qualifiers.

| Level | Event |
|---|---|
| 10 | World Tour (including World Tour Masters) |
| 9 | Challengers |
| 8 | Super Quests |
| 9 | Quest Finals |

== Finals results ==
| Year | Finals Host | Winner | Second place | Third place | Ref. |
|---|---|---|---|---|---|
| 2012 | (United States) Miami | (Puerto Rico) San Juan | (Croatia) Split | (Canada) Edmonton | |
| 2013 | (Turkey) Istanbul | (Slovenia) Brezovica | (Serbia) Novi Sad | (Venezuela) Caracas | |
| 2014 | (Japan) Sendai | (Serbia) Novi Sad | (Canada) Saskatoon | (Slovenia) Kranj | |
| 2015 | (United Arab Emirates) Abu Dhabi | (United Arab Emirates) Novi Sad Al-Wahda (2) | (Slovenia) Kranj | (United States) New York Harlem | |
| 2016 | (United Arab Emirates) Abu Dhabi | (Slovenia) Ljubljana (2) | (Japan) Hamamatsu | (Puerto Rico) Caguas | |
| 2017 | (China) Beijing | (Serbia) Zemun | (United Arab Emirates) Novi Sad Al-Wahda | (Slovenia) Piran | |
| 2018 | (China) Beijing | (Serbia) Novi Sad (3) | (Latvia) Riga | (Netherlands) Amsterdam | |
| 2019 | (Japan) Utsunomiya | (Serbia) Novi Sad (4) | (United States) Princeton | (Latvia) Riga | |
| 2020 | (Saudi Arabia) Jeddah | (Latvia) Riga | (Serbia) Liman | (Lithuania) Utena | |
| 2021 | (Saudi Arabia) Jeddah | (Serbia) Liman | (Russia) Gagarin | (Netherlands) Amsterdam | |
| 2022 | (United Arab Emirates) Abu Dhabi | (Serbia) Ub Huishan NE | (Austria) Vienna | (Netherlands) Amsterdam HiPro | |
| 2023 | (Saudi Arabia) Jeddah | (Serbia) Ub Huishan NE (2) | (Netherlands) Amsterdam HiPro | (Belgium) Antwerp | |
| 2024 | Hong Kong | (Netherlands) Amsterdam | (France) Paris | (Bahrain) Riffa | |
| 2025 | (Bahrain) Manama | (Serbia) Ub (3) | (Lithuania) Raudondvaris Hoptrans | (China) Hangzhou (Germany) Skyliners | |

== Awards ==
Most Valuable Player

| Year | Player | Team |
|---|---|---|
| 2015 | (Serbia) Dušan Domović Bulut | (Serbia) Novi Sad |
| 2016 | (Bosnia and Herzegovina) Jasmin Hercegovac | (Slovenia) Ljubljana |
| 2017 | (Serbia) Stefan Stojačić | (Serbia) Liman |
| 2018 | (Serbia) Dušan Domović Bulut | (United Arab Emirates) Novi Sad Al-Wahda |
| 2019 | (United States) Dominique Victor Jones | (United States) NY Harlem |
| 2020 | (Latvia) Nauris Miezis | (Latvia) Riga |
| 2021 | (Latvia) Kārlis Lasmanis | (Latvia) Riga |
| 2022 | (Serbia) Strahinja Stojačić | (Serbia) Ub Huishan NE |
| 2023 | (Serbia) Strahinja Stojačić | (Serbia) Ub Huishan NE |
| 2024 | (Netherlands) Worthy de Jong | (Netherlands) Amsterdam |
| 2025 | (Serbia) Strahinja Stojačić | (Serbia) Ub |

Most Spectacular Player

| Year | Player | Team |
|---|---|---|
| 2015 | (Philippines) Terrence Romeo | (Philippines) Manila West |
| 2016 | (Serbia) Dušan Domović Bulut | (United Arab Emirates) Novi Sad Al-Wahda |
| 2017 | (Serbia) Dušan Domović Bulut | (United Arab Emirates) Novi Sad Al-Wahda |

== Individual contests winners ==
=== Dunk contest ===
2012 — (Poland) Rafał 'Lipek' Lipiński
2013 — (Poland) Rafał 'Lipek' Lipiński
2014 — (Poland) Rafał 'Lipek' Lipiński
2015 — (Poland) Rafał 'Lipek' Lipiński
2016 — (Ukraine) Vadym 'Miller' Piddubchenko
2017 — (Poland) Rafał 'Lipek' Lipiński
2018 — (Ukraine) Vadym 'Miller' Piddubchenko
2022 — (United States) Brandon Ruffin

=== Shoot-out contest ===
2012 — (Spain) Angel Santana ( (Romania) Bucharest UPB)
2013 — (Indonesia) Fandi Andika Ramadhani ( (Indonesia) Jakarta)
2014 — (Serbia) Dejan Majstorović ( (Serbia) Novi Sad)
2015 — (United States) Derek Griffin ( (United States) Denver)
2016 — (Poland) Marcin Chudy ( (Poland) Gdansk)
2017 — (Canada) Steve Sir ( (Canada) Saskatoon)
2022 — (Latvia) Arturs Strelnieks ( (Latvia) Riga)
