= 2013 FIBA 3x3 World Tour =

Tournament information
- Host(s): Japan; Puerto Rico; Czech Republic; Switzerland; Brazil; Turkey (finals)

The 2013 FIBA 3x3 World Tour was an international 3x3 basketball between 3x3 basketball teams. The tournament is organized by FIBA.

== Finals Qualification ==
Five Masters Tournaments were held in five cities in five countries. 12 teams participated in the finals which was held in Istanbul, Turkey on October 4–5. Two best teams from each masters tournament qualified for the finals.

Event	Date	Location	Berths	Qualified
Direct Qualifiers	4-5 October	(Turkey) Istanbul	2	(Turkey) Caddebostan (Turkey) Bosphorus
Tokyo Masters	20-21 July	(Japan) Tokyo	2	(Indonesia) Jakarta (Japan) Nagoya
San Juan Masters	10-11 August	(Puerto Rico) San Juan	2	(United States) NY Staten (Canada) Saskatoon
Prague Masters	24-25 August	(Czech Republic) Prague	2	(Serbia) Novi Sad (Romania) Bucharest
Lausanne Masters	30-31 August	(Switzerland) Lausanne	2	(Slovenia) Kranj (Slovenia) Brezovica
Rio de Janeiro Masters	14-15 September	(Brazil) Rio de Janeiro	2	(Venezuela) Caracas (Argentina) Neuquén
TOTAL			12	

== Final standing ==
Rank	Team	Record
1st place, gold medalist(s)	(Slovenia) Brezovica	6-0
2nd place, silver medalist(s)	(Serbia) Novi Sad	4-2
3rd place, bronze medalist(s)	(Venezuela) Caracas	4-1
4	(Slovenia) Kranj	2-3
5	(Romania) Bucharest	3-1
6	(Canada) Saskatoon	2-2
7	(Turkey) Caddebostan	2-2
8	(Japan) Nagoya	1-3
9	(Argentina) Neuquén	1-2
10	(Indonesia) Jakarta	0-3
11	(Turkey) Bosphorus	0-3
12	(United States) NY Staten	0-3
