= Novi Sad (3x3 team) =

- Leagues: FIBA 3x3 World Tour
- Founded: 2013
- Dissolved: 2020
- History: Novi Sad (2013–2015); Novi Sad Al-Wahda (2015–2018); Novi Sad (2018–2020)
- Location: Novi Sad, Serbia (2013–2015, 2018–2020); Abu Dhabi, United Arab Emirates (2015–2018)
- Team captain: Dušan Domović Bulut
- Championships: 4 World Tours

Novi Sad (Serbian Cyrillic: Нови Сад) was a men's professional 3x3 basketball club based in Novi Sad, Serbia. The team played in the FIBA 3x3 World Tour. Between 2015 and 2018, the club was based in Abu Dhabi, United Arab Emirates.

The team dissolved after featuring in the 2020 FIBA 3x3 World Tour Europe Masters.

== Players ==
=== Last roster ===
2020 FIBA 3x3 World Tour Europe Masters Novi Sad roster
Players
Coaches

Pos.	No.	Nat.	Name	Ht.	Wt.	Age
G		(Serbia)	Bulut, Dušan (C)	1.91 m (6 ft 3 in)	95 kg (209 lb)	39 – 23 October 1985
F		(Hungary)	Ivosev, Tamás	2.01 m (6 ft 7 in)	110 kg (243 lb)
F		(Serbia)	Milaković, Marko	1.97 m (6 ft 6 in)	105 kg (231 lb)	29 – 10 February 1996
		(Serbia)	Boskovic, Nebojsa	1.93 m (6 ft 4 in)	100 kg (220 lb)
		(Serbia)	Majstorović, Dejan	2.00 m (6 ft 7 in)	100 kg (220 lb)	36 – 22 April 1988
		(Serbia)	Samardžić, Dušan	1.93 m (6 ft 4 in)	92 kg (203 lb)

Head coach

None

Legend

- (C) Team captain
- (R) Reserve
- Injured

- Roster
Updated: February 22, 2022

== Season by season ==
Season	Qualification	Pos.	Finals	FR	Ref.
2013	Prague Masters	Q	Runner-Up	4–2	
2014	Prague Masters	Q	Winner		
2015	Manila Masters	Q	Winner	5–0	
2016	Utsunomiya Masters	Q	4th place	3–1	
2017	Utsunomiya Masters	Q	Runner-Up		

== Trophies and awards ==
=== Trophies ===
- FIBA 3x3 World Tour
  - Winners (4): 2014, 2015, 2018, 2019
  - Runners-up (2): 2013, 2017

=== Individual awards ===
FIBA 3x3 World Tour MVP

- Dušan Domović Bulut – 2015

FIBA 3x3 World Tour Most Spectacular Player

- Dušan Domović Bulut – 2016, 2017

FIBA 3x3 World Tour Final Shoot-Out Contest winner

- Dejan Majstorović – 2014

== Notable players ==
- Dušan Bulut
- Dejan Janjić
- Dejan Majstorović
- Strahinja Milošević
- Marko Savić
- Marko Ždero
