= 2014 FIBA 3x3 World Tour =

FIBA 3x3 World Tour 2014
Tournament information
- Dates: 11–12 October 2014 (finals)
- Host(s): Philippines; China; United States; Czech Republic; Switzerland; Brazil; Japan (finals)
- Teams: 13 (finals)

Final positions
- Champions: (Serbia) Novi Sad (1st title)
- 1st runners-up: (Canada) Saskatoon
- 2nd runners-up: (Slovenia) Kranj

The 2014 FIBA 3x3 World Tour was an international 3x3 basketball competition between 3x3 basketball teams. The tournament is organized by FIBA.

The Grand Final of the 2014 FIBA 3x3 World Tour was held in Sendai, Japan, on 11–12 October.

The winners of an event organised in Japan, the winners of the Beijing Masters, and the top two teams from the other Masters tournaments competed over two days for the honor of representing their city, a 20,000 USD winners' cheque, and a chance to be crowned FIBA 3x3 World Tour Champions.

Victory at the FIBA 3x3 World Tour Final also secures a guaranteed spot at the 2014 FIBA 3x3 All-Stars, held in Doha, Qatar, on 12 December, with total prize money and appearance fees amounting to a grand total of 120,000 USD.

The fans at the event were treated to additional attractions, including a Dunk Contest and the Samsung Shoot-Out Contest, exhibition games, and live performances from DJs, dancers, and other street artists.

== Finals Qualification ==
Six Masters Tournaments were held in six cities in six countries. 12 teams participated in the finals to be which was held in Sendai, Japan on October 11–12. Best teams from each masters tournament qualified for the finals.

Event	Date	Location	Berths	Qualified
Direct Qualifier	11–12 October	(Japan) Tokyo	1	(Japan) Kobe
Manila Masters	19–20 July	(Philippines) Mandaluyong	2	(Philippines) Manila West (Qatar) Doha
Beijing Masters	2–3 August	(China) Beijing	1	(China) Wukesong
Chicago Masters	15–16 August	(United States) Chicago	2	(Canada) Saskatoon (United States) Denver
Prague Masters	23–24 August	(Czech Republic) Prague	2	(Serbia) Novi Sad (Romania) Bucharest
Lausanne Masters	29–30 August	(Switzerland) Lausanne	2	(Slovenia) Kranj (Slovenia) Trbovlje
Rio de Janeiro Masters	27–28 September	(Brazil) Rio de Janeiro	2	(Brazil) São Paulo (Brazil) Santos
TOTAL			12	

== Final standing ==
Qualified for the FIBA 3x3 All-Star

Rank	Team	Record
1st place, gold medalist(s)	(Serbia) Novi Sad	
2nd place, silver medalist(s)	(Canada) Saskatoon	
3rd place, bronze medalist(s)	(Slovenia) Kranj	
4	(Romania) Bucharest	
5	(Philippines) Manila West	
6	(Slovenia) Trbovlje	
7	(Indonesia) Jakarta	
8	(United States) Denver	
9	(Brazil) São Paulo	
10	(Brazil) Santos	
11	(Japan) Kobe	
12	(China) Wukesong	
