= 2019 FIBA 3x3 Asia Cup =

Chinese basketball tournament

Tournament information
- Location: Changsha
- Host: China
- Website: www.fiba.basketball/3x3asiacup/2019

Final positions
- Champions: M: Australia (2nd title); W: Australia (2nd title)
- Runner-up: M: Mongolia; W: Kazakhstan
- 3rd place: M: China; W: Japan

The 2019 FIBA 3x3 Asia Cup was the fourth edition of the FIBA 3x3 Asia Cup. The games of the final tournament were held in Changsha, China between 24 May and 26 May 2019.

== Participating teams ==
The FIBA 3x3 Asia Cup has a men's and women's tournament, each contested by twelve national teams. The teams were drawn into their groups as per their FIBA 3x3 Federation Ranking as of March 1, 2019. Nine teams for the men's team and ten teams for the women's team outright qualified for the final tournament while the remaining berths were contested in a qualification phase held from 22 to 23 May, 2019.

== Main tournaments ==
=== Men ===
Pool A

- Japan
- Jordan
- Turkmenistan

Pool B

- China
- New Zealand
- Qatar

Pool C

- Australia
- Mongolia
- South Korea

Pool D

- Chinese Taipei
- Indonesia
- Kazakhstan

=== Women ===
Pool A

- Australia
- China
- New Zealand

Pool B

- Mongolia
- Kazakhstan
- Kyrgyzstan

Pool C

- Japan
- Philippines
- Sri Lanka

Pool D

- Iran
- Thailand
- Turkmenistan

== Individual contests ==
=== Shoot-out contest (mixed) ===
- Australia (2)
- China (2)
- Chinese Taipei (2)
- India (2)
- Indonesia (1)
- Iran (2)
- Japan (2)
- Jordan (1)
- Kazakhstan (2)
- Kyrgyzstan (2)
- Malaysia (2)
- Maldives (1)
- Mongolia (2)
- New Zealand (2)
- Philippines (2)
- Qatar (1)
- Samoa (2)
- South Korea (1)
- Sri Lanka (2)
- Thailand (2)
- Turkmenistan (2)
- Vanuatu (2)
- Vietnam (1)

== Medalists ==
Event	Gold	Silver	Bronze
Men's team Details	Australia; Tim Coenraad; Greg Hire; Lucas Walker; Tom Wright	Mongolia; Avarzediin Gansükh; Davaasambuugiin Delgernyam; Enkhbatyn Dölgöön; Enkhtaivany Tserenbaatar	China; Chen Peidong; Li Haonan; Liu Hengyi; Zheng Yi
Women's team Details	Australia; Rebecca Cole; Madeleine Garrick; Alice Kunek; Hanna Zavecz	Kazakhstan; Oxana Ivanova; Nadezhda Kondrakova; Zalina Kurazova; Tamara Yagodkina	Japan; Minami Iju; Kiho Miyashita; Risa Nishioka; Mio Shinozaki
Shoot-out contest (mixed); Details	Tamara Yagodkina (KAZ)	Trần Đăng Khoa (VIE)	Sapaly Zaýirow (TKM)
