= 2019 FIBA 3x3 Asia Cup – Women's tournament =

Basketball tournament

2019 FIBA 3x3 Asia Cup Women's tournament
Tournament information
- Location: Changsha, China
- Dates: May 22–26
- Host: China
- Venue: Changsha Shopping Mall
- Teams: 18

Final positions
- Champion: Australia
- 1st runners-up: Kazakhstan
- 2nd runners-up: Japan

The 2019 FIBA 3x3 Asia Cup is the fourth edition of the FIBA Asia 3X3 Cup. The games of the final tournament were held in Changsha, China between 24 May and 26 May 2019.

== Players ==
Seed	Team	Players (by rank)					
Seed	Team	1	China	Dilana Dilishati	Wu Di	Li Shan	Zhang Jiahe
2	Mongolia	Chimeddolgor Enkhtaivan	Ganzul Davaasuren	Bolor-Erdene Baatar	Solongo Bayasgalan		
3	Japan	Kiho Miyashita	Minami Iju	Risa Nishioka	Mio Shinozaki		
4	Iran	Masoumeh Esmaeilzadeh Soudjani	Saiedeh Elli	Delaram Vakili	Mozhgan Kohdadadi		
5	Turkmenistan	Leyla Halilova	Nigyara Nagiyeva	Ayna Gokova	Viktoriya Rahmanova		
6	Sri Lanka	Kristina Gunawijeya	Anjalee Ekanayake	Benika Thalagela	Prasadi Fonseka		
7	Kazakhstan	Zalina Kurazova	Tamara Yagodkina	Nadezhda Kondrakova	Oxana Ivanova		
8	Australia	Rebecca Cole	Alice Kunek	Madeleine Garrick	Hanna Zavecz		
9	New Zealand	Antonia Farnworth	Stella Beck	Tanaka Gapare	Nicole Ruske		
10	Philippines	Jack Danielle Animam	Janine Pontejos	Afril Bernardino	Clare Castro		
12	Kyrgyzstan	Kristina Nekrasova	Kseniia Kulik	Victoria Gilina	Ekaterina Mezentseva		
16	Thailand	Naruemol Banmoo	Penphan Yothanan	Wantanee Sangmanee	Khwanjira Thongdaeng		

== Main tournament ==
=== Preliminary round ===
==== Group A ====
Pos	Team	Pld	W	L	PF	PA	PD	Qualification	(Australia)	(New Zealand)	(China)
1	Australia	2	2	0	33	29	+4	Qualification to knockout stage	—	17–15	16–14
2	New Zealand	2	1	1	31	32	−1	Qualification to knockout stage	15–17	—	16–15
3	China	2	0	2	29	32	−3		14–16	15–16	—

Source: FIBA

==== Group B ====
Pos	Team	Pld	W	L	PF	PA	PD	Qualification	(Kazakhstan)	(Mongolia)	(Kyrgyzstan)
1	Kazakhstan	2	2	0	38	16	+22	Qualification to knockout stage	—	17–14	21–2
2	Mongolia	2	1	1	33	22	+11	Qualification to knockout stage	14–17	—	19–5
3	Kyrgyzstan	2	0	2	7	40	−33		2–21	5–19	—

Source: FIBA

==== Group C ====
Pos	Team	Pld	W	L	PF	PA	PD	Qualification	(Japan)	(Philippines)	(Sri Lanka)
1	Japan	2	2	0	42	19	+23	Qualification to knockout stage	—	20–8	22–11
2	Philippines	2	1	1	29	26	+3	Qualification to knockout stage	8–20	—	21–6
3	Sri Lanka	2	0	2	17	43	−26		11–22	6–21	—

Source: FIBA

==== Group D ====
Pos	Team	Pld	W	L	PF	PA	PD	Qualification	(Turkmenistan)	(Thailand)	(Iran)
1	Turkmenistan	2	2	0	28	23	+5	Qualification to knockout stage	—	11–7	17–16
2	Thailand	2	1	1	28	25	+3	Qualification to knockout stage	7–11	—	21–14
3	Iran	2	0	2	30	38	−8		16–17	14–21	—

Source: FIBA

=== Knockout round ===
Quarterfinals
Australia	21
Philippines	16
Turkmenistan	15
Mongolia	17
Kazakhstan	21
Thailand	19
Japan	21
New Zealand	15

Semifinals
Australia	21
Mongolia	15
Kazakhstan	17
Japan	14

Final
Australia	20
Kazakhstan	9
3rd place
Mongolia	14
Japan	21

== Final rankings ==
#	Team	Pld	W	L	PF	PA	PD	FIBA 3x3 Ranking		
#	Team	Pld	W	L	PF	PA	PD	Old	New	+/−
1st place, gold medalist(s)	Australia	5	5	0	95	69	+26	26	26	Steady
2nd place, silver medalist(s)	Kazakhstan	5	4	1	85	58	+16	25	25	Steady
3rd place, bronze medalist(s)	Japan	5	4	1	98	65	+33	7	7	Steady
4th	Mongolia	5	2	3	79	79	0	2	3	▼1
Eliminated at the quarterfinals
5th	Turkmenistan	3	2	1	43	40	+3	22	21	▲1
6th	Thailand	3	1	2	47	46	+1	76	60	▲16
7th	New Zealand	3	1	2	46	53	–7	34	38	▼4
8th	Philippines	3	1	2	45	47	–2	31	29	▲2
Eliminated at the preliminary round
9th	Iran	2	0	2	30	38	−8	14	13	▲1
10th	China	2	0	2	29	32	−3	1	1	Steady
11th	Sri Lanka	2	0	2	17	43	−26	23	23	Steady
12th	Kyrgyzstan	2	0	2	7	40	−33	39	39	Steady
