= Philippines women's national 3x3 team =

National 3x3 basketball team

Philippines
- FIBA ranking: 19
- Joined FIBA: 1936
- FIBA zone: FIBA Asia
- National federation: SBP

World Cup
- Appearances: 2

Asia Cup
- Appearances: 5
- Medals: (silver) (2026)
Home	Away

The women's national 3x3 team of the Philippines represents the country in international 3x3 basketball matches and is governed by the Samahang Basketbol ng Pilipinas.

== History ==
=== In multi-sport Asian tournaments (2009–2016) ===
One of the Philippines' initial participation in women's 3x3 was at the 2009 Asian Youth Games in Singapore where it managed to advance from the preliminary round only to lose to South Korea in the quarterfinal.

The Philippine women's 3x3 also participated at the Asian Beach Games, particularly in the 2012, 2014, and 2016 editions.

=== 2018 FIBA 3x3 World Cup ===
As the consequence of the Philippines hosting the 2018 edition of the FIBA 3x3 World Cup, the women's team was automatically qualified to play in the international tournament. The Philippines made their debut at the women's 3x3 debut after their men's team made their debut in the 2016 edition. It was the first time that a women's team will participate in a 3x3 tournament organized by FIBA. The national team was coached by Patrick Aquino and intended their stint to promote women's basketball in general in the country.

The lost their first match against the Netherlands, 11–21 and Germany, 10–12. Coach Aquino attributes the defeats to inexperience of the players in 3x3 basketball though he thought that team could potentially compete with European countries. They lost their remaining games to Spain, 17–21, and Hungary, 15–18 and finished at the bottom of Pool D. Their coach hoped that the Samahang Basketbol ng Pilipinas could lobby for the women's 3x3 participation in the 2018 Asian Games after their FIBA 3x3 World Cup stint. However the Philippines did not enter any team in 3x3 basketball in the continental games.

The Samahang Basketbol ng Pilipinas (SBP), the country's national association, plans to come up with a road map to help the Philippines qualify a team in 3x3 basketball in the 2020 Summer Olympics following the national team's stint in the 2018 FIBA 3x3 World Cup. The SBP plans to create a pool of players which will be dedicated to the 3x3 variant of basketball.

=== 2019 FIBA Asia 3x3 Cup ===
The women's national team entered the 2019 FIBA Asia 3X3 Cup but had to participate in the qualifying draw in order to progress to the tournament proper. They managed to do so after topping their group in the qualifying draw which consisted of Samoa, Vanuatu and Chinese Taipei. In the group stage of the qualifying proper they suffered a defeat to Japan but won over Sri Lanka to progress to the quarterfinals. They ended their bid when they lost their quarterfinal tie against Australia.

=== 2019 FIBA U18 World Cup ===
The Philippines' qualified to send a women's team in the 2019 FIBA U18 World Cup in Ulanbataar, Mongolia and is set to make a debut in the international youth tournament.

=== 2025 FIBA 3x3 Asia Cup ===
The team finished fourth in the 2025 FIBA 3x3 Asia Cup despite Camille Clarin's injury.

=== 2026 FIBA 3x3 Asia Cup ===
The Philippines lost to Australia in the final of the 2026 FIBA 3x3 Asia Cup finishing as runners-up, their best ever finish in the tournament.

=== Other tournaments ===
The Philippine national team had two squads (Gilas A and Gilas B) participated at the 2024 PBA Women's 3x3 Invitational.

== Senior competitions ==
=== World Cup ===
Year	Position	Pld	W	L
(Greece) 2012	Did not qualify			
(Russia) 2014	Did not qualify			
(China) 2016	Did not qualify			
(France) 2017	Did not qualify			
(Philippines) 2018	17th place	4	0	4
(Netherlands) 2019	Did not qualify			
(Belgium) 2022	Did not qualify			
(Austria) 2023	Did not qualify			
(Mongolia) 2025	Did not qualify			
(Poland) 2026	17th place	4	0	4
(Singapore) 2027	To be determined			
Total	2/11	8	0	8

=== Asia Cup ===
Year	Position	Pld	W	L
(Qatar) 2013	Did not enter			
(Mongolia) 2017	Did not enter			
(China) 2018	Did not enter			
(China) 2019	7th place	3	1	2
(Singapore) 2022	Did not enter			
(Singapore) 2023	7th place	3	1	2
(Singapore) 2024	6th place	3	2	1
(Singapore) 2025	Fourth place	5	2	3
(Singapore) 2026	2nd place	5	3	2
Total	5/9	19	9	10

=== Southeast Asian Games ===
Year	Position	Pld	W	L
(Philippines) 2019	1st place	7	6	1
(Vietnam) 2021	Fourth place	8	3	5
(Cambodia) 2023	2nd place	5	3	2
(Thailand) 2025	Sixth place	2	0	2
Total		22	12	10

== Youth competitions ==
=== U18 World Championships ===
Year	Position	Pld	W	L
(Italy) 2011	did not qualify			
(Serbia) 2012	did not qualify			
(Indonesia) 2013	did not qualify			
(Hungary) 2015	did not qualify			
(Kazakhstan) 2016	did not qualify			
(China) 2017	did not qualify			
(Mongolia) 2019	did not qualify			
Total				

=== Asian Games ===
Year	Position	Pld	W	L
(Indonesia) 2018	did not enter			
(China) 2022	Withdrew			
(Japan) 2026	2nd place	6	5	1
Total	1 silver	6	5	1

=== Asia U18 Cup ===
Year	Position	Pld	W	L
(Thailand) 2013	Quarterfinals	5	3	2
(Malaysia) 2016	9th place	4	0	4
(Malaysia) 2017	5th place	5	3	2
(Malaysia) 2018	did not enter			
(Malaysia) 2019	3rd place	5	3	2
Total	1 bronze	19	9	10

== Squad ==
=== Previous ===
==== Senior ====
Tournament	Players	Reference
2018 FIBA 3x3 World Cup	Afril Bernardino; Janine Pontejos; Jack Animam; Gemma Miranda	
2019 FIBA 3x3 Asia Cup	Afril Bernardino; Janine Pontejos; Jack Animam; Claire Castro	
2023 FIBA 3x3 Asia Cup	Afril Bernardino; Ana Alicia Katrina Castillo; Claire Castro; Janine Pontejos	
2024 FIBA 3x3 Asia Cup	Mikka Cacho; Camille Clarin; Jhazmin Joson; Kaye Pingol	
2025 FIBA 3x3 Asia Cup	Mikka Cacho; Camille Clarin; Jhazmin Joson; Kaye Pingol	
2026 FIBA 3x3 Asia Cup	Cheska Apag; Afril Bernardino; Mikka Cacho; Kacey dela Rosa	

==== Youth ====
Tournament	Players	Reference
2019 FIBA 3x3 Under-18 Asia Cup	Camille Clarin; Kristine Cayabyab; Ella Fajardo; Angel Surada	
