= 2017 FIBA 3x3 U18 World Cup =

2017 edition of the 3x3 U18 Championship

2017 FIBA 3x3 U18 World Cup 2017 FIBA 3x3未满18岁世界冠军 2017 FIBA 3x3 wèi mǎn 18 suì shìjiè guànjūn

Tournament information
- Location: In front of the New Century Global Center, Chengdu
- Dates: June 28–July 2
- Host: China
- Venue: 1
- Teams: 40

The 2017 FIBA 3x3 U18 World Cup, which was hosted by China, was an international 3x3 basketball event that featured separate competitions for men's and women's under-18 national teams. The tournament was held in Chengdu in front of the New Century Global Center. It was co-organized by the FIBA.

== Participating teams ==
The FIBA 3x3 Federation Ranking was used as basis to determine the participating FIBA member associations.

=== Men ===
Group A

- Netherlands
- Philippines
- Poland
- Turkmenistan
- Israel

Group B

- Ukraine
- New Zealand
- Bahrain
- Qatar
- Georgia

Group C

- Hungary
- Slovenia
- China
- Turkey
- South Korea

Group D

- Romania
- Indonesia
- Belgium
- Jordan
- Uganda

=== Women ===
Group A

- Hungary
- United States
- Switzerland
- Australia
- Japan

Group B

- Netherlands
- Andorra
- Germany
- Czech Republic
- Sri Lanka

Group C

- Argentina
- Russia
- Italy
- Venezuela
- China

Group D

- Spain
- France
- Egypt
- Kazakhstan
- Singapore
