= Camille Clarin =

Filipino basketball player

Personal information
- Born: May 28, 2001 (age 25) Antipolo, Rizal, Philippines
- Listed height: 5 ft 10 in (1.78 m)
- Listed weight: 150 lb (68 kg)

Career information
- High school: Blair Academy (Blairstown, New Jersey)
- College: NU
- Position: Guard

Career highlights
- 2x UAAP champion (2019, 2022); UAAP 3x3 champion (2022)
Medals
Women's basketball
Philippines
SEA Games
| Gold medal – first place | 2021 Hanoi | Team |
| Silver medal – second place | 2023 Phnom Penh | Team |
Women's 3x3 basketball
Philippines
FIBA 3x3 U18 Asia Cup
| Bronze medal – third place | 2019 Malaysia | Team |

Camille Izabel Policarpio Clarin (born May 28, 2001) is a Filipino-Canadian former college basketball player for the NU Lady Bulldogs. She has also represented the Philippines in international competitions.

== Early life ==
Clarin was born on May 28, 2001, in Antipolo, Philippines. She grew up in Canada and began playing basketball at age 10, drawn to the sport because her Filipino family and community culturally embraced it as a pastime and are deeply involved in the sport. To improve her skills, she competed in all-boys leagues. Besides basketball, she was also a swimmer and figure skater. As she got older, she played in the Ontario Basketball Association (OBA).

== High school career ==
Clarin attended Blair Academy in Blairstown, New Jersey, graduating in 2019.

At age 15, she tore her anterior cruciate ligament (ACL) while going up for a layup during the Filipino Basketball Association of North America (FBANA) tournament. She spent most of her sophomore season recuperating. During her time at Blair, she became a three-time Mid-Atlantic Prep League champion. In her senior year, she broke her own school record by hitting 11 three-pointers, surpassing her previous record of 10 set earlier.

== College career ==
Clarin played for the NU Lady Bulldogs, the women's basketball team of National University (NU), in the UAAP. She was initially set to play for Hamilton College, a Division III college, but instead chose to go to the Philippines and play for NU. Her rookie season was in 2019. That season, she helped the Lady Bulldogs extend their winning streak to 96 games and secure their sixth consecutive championship. She was also awarded the Athlete Scholar honor at the conclusion of Season 82.

In Season 84, she helped NU secure a three-peat in 3x3 basketball.

In Season 85, she was part of the NU squad that reached their 100th consecutive win. Their impressive streak ended at 108 games with a loss to the De La Salle Lady Archers, marking their first defeat in nine seasons. Despite this, they went on to win their seventh consecutive championship that season, tying the record held by the UE Lady Warriors for the most consecutive titles in the league.

For Season 86, Clarin became team captain. They began the season with a win over the Ateneo Blue Eagles, in which she scored 11 points. Their first loss of the season came against the UP Fighting Maroons. Clarin scored a season-high 19 points against DLSU, shooting 7-of-12 from the field while also contributing six rebounds. NU secured second place in the standings with a win over the Adamson Lady Falcons, where she had 18 points, three rebounds, three assists, and two steals. They then earned their sixth consecutive win since the loss to UP in a game versus the FEU Lady Tamaraws, with Clarin recording 12 points, five assists, four steals, and three rebounds. NU rose to first place in the standings after another win over Ateneo. They closed out the elimination rounds on an 11-game winning streak, securing the first seed with another victory against UP, in which Clarin nearly achieved a double-double with eight points and nine assists.

In their playoff run, the Lady Bulldogs faced fourth-seeded Ateneo in the Final Four. Clarin led them past Ateneo in that matchup with 12 points. In the finals, they faced the UST Tigresses. In game 1, UST pulled off the upset despite her 18 points, six assists, and five rebounds. In game 2, although she missed two clutch free throws, NU held on to win. Despite those misses, she had a strong performance with 18 points, eight assists, two rebounds, and one steal. However, in game 3, she had her worst performance of the season, shooting 0-for-11, and NU lost the championship to UST.

In her final collegiate season, Clarin led the Lady Bulldogs to the Season 87 championship by defeating the defending champion UST in a three-game rematch of the previous year's finals, securing their eighth women's basketball title.

== National team career ==
In 2019, Clarin made a game-winning putback to secure the victory over the Netherlands in the 2019 FIBA 3x3 U18 World Cup. Then, they defeated the Czech Republic in overtime. Their run ended in the quarterfinals with a loss to China. Later that year, they beat China in the FIBA 3x3 U18 Asia Cup to claim the bronze medal.

Clarin first played for the senior team in 2021 during that year's FIBA Women's Asia Cup. She won her first SEA Games gold medal in 2022 in women's 5x5 basketball. That same year, she also competed in the 2022 FIBA Asia 3x3 Cup. They failed to advance to the main draw after losing to Thailand and were eliminated early. In 2023, she helped Gilas secure a SEA Games silver medal despite battling the flu throughout the tournament. She also helped Gilas retain its Division A status during the 2023 FIBA Women's Asia Cup.

In 2024, Clarin helped Gilas make it to the main draw of the 2024 FIBA 3x3 Asia Cup as they went undefeated in the qualifying draw. However, they then lost to Chinese Taipei in the quarterfinals. At the 2025 FIBA 3x3 Asia Cup they reached the quarterfinals again. However, Clarin suffered from a knee injury. The team reached the third place playoff and finished fourth despite Clarin's absence.

== Media career ==
Clarin has retired from playing basketball and transitioned into a new career as a sports analyst and courtside reporter. She has been part of the broadcasting panel for the Women's Maharlika Pilipinas Basketball League (WMPBL) and served as a courtside reporter for the UAAP Season 88 women's basketball tournament.

Clarin was previously an All-Star Analyst for NBA.com Philippines and one of the hosts of NBA Hype on NBA TV Philippines.

== Endorsements ==
Clarin is an endorser for MILO Philippines and Nike.

== Personal life ==
Clarin cited 3-point champions from the NBA and WNBA—Allie Quigley, Ray Allen, and Klay Thompson—as players she looks up to.

Clarin is an advocate for the advancement of women's sports in the Philippines, drawing from her personal experience with the general lack of support for women's sports when she first moved to the Philippines to play for National University. She emphasized the tremendous growth of women's basketball in the Philippines in recent years when WNBA superstar Sabrina Ionescu visited Manila from March 10 to 12, 2025, as the first stop of her Asia tour shortly after winning the 2024 WNBA Finals. On March 10, Clarin joined Ionescu on a panel at Nike The Fort in Bonifacio Global City (BGC) to discuss basketball and emphasize the importance of learning from setbacks.
