= 2016 FIBA 3x3 World Championships =

Basketball event

2016 FIBA 3x3 世界锦标赛 2016 FIBA 3x3 shì jiè jǐn biāo sài

Tournament details
- Host country: China
- City: Guangzhou
- Dates: 11–15 October 2016
- Teams: 40
- Venue: 1 (in 1 host city)

The 2016 FIBA 3x3 World Championships, hosted by China, was an international 3x3 basketball event that featured separate competitions for men's and women's national teams. The tournament was run between 11 and 15 October 2016, in Guangzhou outside the Tianhe Sport Complex. It was co-organized by the FIBA.

== Host selection ==
On May 10, 2015, FIBA announced the Guangzhou as host city of the 2016 tournament.

== Medalists ==
Event	Gold	Silver	Bronze
Men's; Details	Serbia	United States	Slovenia
Women's; Details	Czech Republic	Ukraine	United States

== Participating teams ==
The FIBA 3x3 Federation Ranking was used as basis to determine the participating FIBA member associations. China as hosts automatically qualifies in both men's and women's tournament while the Qatar and the United States winners of the 2014 edition in the men's and women's tournaments respectively.

The pools for the tournaments were unveiled on 20 September 2016.

=== Men ===
Group A

- Serbia
- Russia
- Italy
- Qatar
- New Zealand

Group B

- Slovenia
- Uruguay
- Andorra
- Indonesia
- Egypt

Group C

- Poland
- Romania
- Spain
- Hungary
- Philippines

Group D

- United States
- Netherlands
- Japan
- Turkey
- China

=== Women ===
Group A

- Netherlands
- Ukraine
- Poland
- Indonesia
- New Zealand

Group B

- Hungary
- Andorra
- Argentina
- Macau
- Australia

Group C

- Italy
- Spain
- Japan
- United States
- Chinese Taipei

Group D

- France
- Czech Republic
- China
- Romania
- Cook Islands
