= 3x3 basketball at the 2022 Asian Games – Women's tournament =

Women at the 2022 Asian Games
- Venue: Deqing Geographic Information Park
- Date: 25 September – 1 October 2023
- Competitors: 56 from 15 nations

Medalists
gold medal	China
silver medal	Mongolia
bronze medal	Japan

The women's 3-on-3 basketball tournament at the 2022 Asian Games was held at the Deqing Geographic Information Park, Huzhou, China from 25 September to 1 October 2023. Teams were restricted to under-23 players.

== Squads ==
China	Chinese Taipei	Hong Kong	India
Wang Jiahui; Chen Mingling; Wan Jiyuan; Wang Xinyu	Hsu Shih-han; Huang Chiao-chun; Chen Yu-chieh; Kuo Hung-ting	Ng Yan Tung; Chan Wing Yan; Ho Pui Ying; Kwan Hoi Pui	Vaishnavi Yadav; Siya Deodhar; C. S. Anumaria; Yashneet Kaur
Japan	Jordan	Kazakhstan	Malaysia
Nanami Seki; Momoka Hanashima; Karin Imori; Mayu Kubota	Masa Al-Noubani; Thekra Shehadeh; Janset Yaltchen; Marian Wahab	Diana Bushmeleva; Dilnaz Yerkebay; Xeniya Abdurashitova; Valeriya Kapitonova	Tan Yin Jie; Tan Sin Jie; Sammi Tan; Foo Suet Ying
Maldives	Mongolia	Nepal	Philippines
Aishath Inasha; Zuha Ashraf Ali; Aishath Raaee Hamza; Fathimath Ehau Shameem	Bat-Erdeniin Ariuntsetseg; Tsendjavyn Bolortsetseg; Ölziibatyn Indra; Erdenebayangiin Narangoo	Shreya Khadka; Meena Gurung; Garisha Silwal; Rinchhen Moktan	Withdrew after two replacement players (Cielo Pagdulagan and Marga Villanueva) were denied.
South Korea	Thailand	Uzbekistan	
Lim Kyu-ri; Jung Ye-rim; Park Seong-jin; Lee Da-yeon	Sroifa Phetnin; Phanwasa Boonjun; Palida Naumkong; Pitchayapa Phuekraksa	Farangiz Jalilova; Anastasiya Tsoy; Inna Shek; Faridakhon Kurvanbaeva	

== Results ==
All times are China Standard Time (UTC+08:00)

=== Round robin ===
==== Pool A ====
Pos	Team	Pld	W	L	PF	PA	PD	Qualification
1	China	2	2	0	43	12	+31	Quarterfinals
2	Uzbekistan	2	1	1	23	35	−12	Qualification for quarterfinals
3	India	2	0	2	22	41	−19	Qualification for quarterfinals

Source: FIBA

25 September
13:50

India	14–19	Uzbekistan
Pts: Yadav 9		Pts: Jalilova, Tsoy 8

Deqing Geographic Information Park, Huzhou
Referees: Nagoshi (JPN), Burmaa (MGL)

27 September
19:25

China	22–8	India
Pts: Chen 8		Pts: Yadav 6

Deqing Geographic Information Park, Huzhou
Referees: Soliman (QAT), Nagoshi (JPN)

29 September
19:25

Uzbekistan	4–21	China
Pts: Jalilova, Tsoy 2		Pts: Wan 7

Deqing Geographic Information Park, Huzhou
Referees: Burmaa (MGL), Ibragimow (TKM)

==== Pool B ====
Pos	Team	Pld	W	L	PF	PA	PD	Qualification
1	Chinese Taipei	3	3	0	59	28	+31	Quarterfinals
2	Japan	3	2	1	53	26	+27	Qualification for quarterfinals
3	Kazakhstan	3	1	2	38	51	−13	Qualification for quarterfinals
4	Nepal	3	0	3	16	61	−45	

Source: FIBA

25 September
14:15

Japan	22–4	Nepal
Pts: Kubota 12		Pts: Gurung, Silwal 2

Deqing Geographic Information Park, Huzhou
Referees: Ibragimow (TKM), Soliman (QAT)

25 September
19:00

Chinese Taipei	22–14	Kazakhstan
Pts: Chen 12		Pts: Kapitonova 8

Deqing Geographic Information Park, Huzhou
Referees: Nagoshi (JPN), Kim (KOR)

27 September
13:50

Japan	12–15	Chinese Taipei
Pts: Kubota 5		Pts: Chen 6

Deqing Geographic Information Park, Huzhou
Referees: Liu (MAS), Ibragimow (TKM)

27 September
14:15

Nepal	10–17	Kazakhstan
Pts: Khadka, Gurung 4		Pts: Bushmeleva 8

Deqing Geographic Information Park, Huzhou
Referees: Shi (CHN), Kim (KOR)

29 September
14:15

Chinese Taipei	22–2	Nepal
Pts: Kuo 8		Pts: Khadka, Gurung 1

Deqing Geographic Information Park, Huzhou
Referees: Soliman (QAT), Banashankara (IND)

29 September
19:00

Kazakhstan	7–19	Japan
Pts: Yerkebay 4		Pts: Kubota 10

Deqing Geographic Information Park, Huzhou
Referees: Liu (MAS), Su (TPE)

==== Pool C ====
Pos	Team	Pld	W	L	PF	PA	PD	Qualification
1	Mongolia	3	3	0	41	24	+17	Quarterfinals
2	Jordan	3	2	1	26	33	−7	Qualification for quarterfinals
3	Hong Kong	3	1	2	28	38	−10	Qualification for quarterfinals
—	Philippines	3	0	3	0	0	0	

Source: FIBA

25 September
15:30

Mongolia	21–15	Hong Kong
Pts: Ariuntsetseg, Indra 9		Pts: Kwan 10

Deqing Geographic Information Park, Huzhou
Referees: Nagoshi (JPN), Banashankara (IND)

25 September
19:25

Jordan	vs.	Philippines
Forfeit

Deqing Geographic Information Park, Huzhou

27 September
15:30

Hong Kong	vs.	Philippines
Forfeit

Deqing Geographic Information Park, Huzhou

27 September
15:55

Mongolia	20–9	Jordan
Pts: Ariuntsetseg 11		Pts: Yaltchen 5

Deqing Geographic Information Park, Huzhou
Referees: Su (TPE), Kim (KOR)

29 September
13:50

Philippines	vs.	Mongolia
Forfeit

Deqing Geographic Information Park, Huzhou

29 September
15:30

Jordan	17–13	Hong Kong
Pts: Shehadeh 7		Pts: Chan 8

Deqing Geographic Information Park, Huzhou
Referees: Kim (KOR), Soliman (QAT)

==== Pool D ====
Pos	Team	Pld	W	L	PF	PA	PD	Qualification
1	South Korea	3	3	0	41	23	+18	Quarterfinals
2	Malaysia	3	2	1	37	35	+2	Qualification for quarterfinals
3	Thailand	3	1	2	43	28	+15	Qualification for quarterfinals
4	Maldives	3	0	3	19	54	−35	

Source: FIBA

25 September
15:55

Malaysia	15–12	Maldives
Pts: Sa. Tan 8		Pts: Inasha 7

Deqing Geographic Information Park, Huzhou
Referees: Shi (CHN), Soliman (QAT)

25 September
20:40

Thailand	10–12	South Korea
Pts: Naumkong 7		Pts: Lim, Jung 4

Deqing Geographic Information Park, Huzhou
Referees: Shi (CHN), Banashankara (IND)

27 September
19:00

Maldives	5–17	South Korea
Pts: Inasha 3		Pts: Park 7

Deqing Geographic Information Park, Huzhou
Referees: Burmaa (MGL), Rulyov (KAZ)

27 September
20:40

Malaysia	14–11	Thailand
Pts: Tan S.J. 7		Pts: Phetnin 5

Deqing Geographic Information Park, Huzhou
Referees: Rulyov (KAZ), Burmaa (MGL)

29 September
15:55

Thailand	22–2	Maldives
Pts: Boonjun 7		Pts: Ali, Shameem 1

Deqing Geographic Information Park, Huzhou
Referees: Banashankara (IND), Kim (KOR)

29 September
20:40

South Korea	12–8	Malaysia
Pts: Jung 5		Pts: Foo 6

Deqing Geographic Information Park, Huzhou
Referees: Su (TPE), Ibragimow (TKM)

=== Knockout round ===
Qualification for quarterfinals
30 September
Jordan	9
Kazakhstan	13
30 September
Japan	22
Hong Kong	14
30 September
Uzbekistan	7
Thailand	19
30 September
Malaysia	6
India	16

Quarterfinals
30 September
China	21
Kazakhstan	7
30 September
South Korea	16
Japan	19
30 September
Mongolia	16
Thailand	13
30 September
Chinese Taipei	21
India	10

Semifinals
1 October
China	21
Japan	15
1 October
Mongolia	21
Chinese Taipei	20

Gold medal game
1 October
China	21
Mongolia	12
Bronze medal game
1 October
Japan	21
Chinese Taipei	13

==== Qualification for quarterfinals ====
30 September
13:00

Jordan	9–13	Kazakhstan
Pts: Yaltchen 5		Pts: Yerkebay 6

Deqing Geographic Information Park, Huzhou
Referees: Shi (CHN), Soliman (QAT)

30 September
13:50

Japan	22–14	Hong Kong
Pts: Imori, Kubota 8		Pts: Ng 9

Deqing Geographic Information Park, Huzhou
Referees: Su (TPE), Burmaa (MGL)

30 September
14:40

Uzbekistan	7–19	Thailand
Pts: Kurvanbaeva 5		Pts: Phuekraksa 11

Deqing Geographic Information Park, Huzhou
Referees: Nagoshi (JPN), Banashankara (IND)

30 September
15:30

Malaysia	6–16	India
Pts: Tan Y. 3		Pts: Yadav 9

Deqing Geographic Information Park, Huzhou
Referees: Su (TPE), Shi (CHN)

==== Quarterfinals ====
30 September
18:00

China	21–7	Kazakhstan
Pts: Chen 9		Pts: Bushmeleva 6

Deqing Geographic Information Park, Huzhou
Referees: Nagoshi (JPN), Banashankara (IND)

30 September
18:50

South Korea	16–19	Japan
Pts: Lee 7		Pts: Kubota 8

Deqing Geographic Information Park, Huzhou
Referees: Su (TPE), Soliman (QAT)

30 September
19:40

Mongolia	16–13	Thailand
Pts: Indra 6		Pts: Phetnin, Boonjun 5

Deqing Geographic Information Park, Huzhou
Referees: Ibragimow (TKM), Kim (KOR)

30 September
20:30

Chinese Taipei	21–10	India
Pts: Chen 8		Pts: Yadav 7

Deqing Geographic Information Park, Huzhou
Referees: Rulyov (KAZ), Burmaa (MGL)

==== Semifinals ====
1 October
16:00

China	21–15	Japan
Pts: Wan 10		Pts: Kubota 13

Deqing Geographic Information Park, Huzhou
Referees: Rulyov (KAZ), Ibragimow (TKM)

1 October
16:25

Mongolia	21–20	Chinese Taipei
Pts: Ariuntsetseg 9		Pts: Chen 9

Deqing Geographic Information Park, Huzhou
Referees: Kim (KOR), Soliman (QAT)

==== Bronze medal game ====
1 October
19:00

Japan	21–13	Chinese Taipei
Pts: Kubota 12		Pts: Kuo 6

Deqing Geographic Information Park, Huzhou
Referees: Ibragimow (TKM), Burmaa (MGL)

==== Gold medal game ====
1 October
20:00

China	21–12	Mongolia
Pts: Wan 9		Pts: Ariuntsetseg 6

Deqing Geographic Information Park, Huzhou
Referees: Nagoshi (JPN), Kim (KOR)

== Final standing ==
Rank	Team	Pld	W	L
1st place, gold medalist(s)	China	5	5	0
2nd place, silver medalist(s)	Mongolia	6	5	1
3rd place, bronze medalist(s)	Japan	7	5	2
4	Chinese Taipei	6	4	2
5	South Korea	4	3	1
6	Thailand	5	2	3
7	Kazakhstan	5	2	3
8	India	4	1	3
9	Jordan	4	2	2
10	Malaysia	4	2	2
11	Uzbekistan	3	1	2
12	Hong Kong	4	1	3
13	Maldives	3	0	3
14	Nepal	3	0	3
—	Philippines	3	0	3
