= 2019 FIBA 3x3 Asia Cup qualification =

The 2019 FIBA 3x3 Asia Cup qualification refers to the qualification process for the 2019 FIBA 3x3 Asia Cup.

Nine teams for the men's competition and ten teams for the women's competition outright qualifies for the FIBA 3x3 Asia Cup with three men's national teams and two women's national teams set to secure a berth in the final tournament through a qualification tournament to be held from 23 to 24 May 2019. The top teams from each group qualifies for the final tournament.

== Results ==
=== Men's ===
==== Group A ====
Pos	Team	Pld	W	L	PF	PA	PD	Qualification	(Qatar)	(Philippines)	(Iran)	(Samoa)	(Thailand)
1	Qatar	4	4	0	78	69	+9	2019 FIBA 3x3 Asia Cup – Group B	—	21–17	17–16	21–16	19–10
2	Philippines	4	2	2	71	69	+2		17–21	—	21–19	22–15	11–14
3	Iran	4	2	2	77	53	+24		16–17	19–21	—	21–9	21–6
4	Samoa	4	1	3	53	75	−22		16–21	15–22	9–21	—	13–11
5	Thailand	4	1	3	41	64	−23		10–19	14–11	6–21	11–13	—

Source: FIBA
Rules for classification: 1) Wins; 2) Head-to-head record; 3) Points scored; 4) Higher seed.

==== Group B ====
Pos	Team	Pld	W	L	PF	PA	PD	Qualification	(South Korea)	(India)	(Malaysia)	(Vanuatu)
1	South Korea	3	3	0	62	25	+37	2019 FIBA 3x3 Asia Cup – Group C	—	20–19	21–3	21–3
2	India	3	2	1	61	43	+18		19–20	—	21–13	21–10
3	Malaysia	3	1	2	37	54	−17		3–21	13–21	—	21–12
4	Vanuatu	3	0	3	25	63	−38		3–21	10–21	12–21	—

Source: FIBA
Rules for classification: 1) Wins; 2) Head-to-head record; 3) Points scored; 4) Higher seed.

==== Group C ====
Pos	Team	Pld	W	L	PF	PA	PD	Qualification	(Chinese Taipei)	(Vietnam)	(Kyrgyzstan)	(Sri Lanka)
1	Chinese Taipei	3	3	0	54	41	+13	2019 FIBA 3x3 Asia Cup – Group D	—	21–18	14–13	19–10
2	Vietnam	3	2	1	60	48	+12		18–21	—	21–10	21–17
3	Kyrgyzstan	3	1	2	44	45	−1		13–14	10–21	—	21–10
4	Sri Lanka	3	0	3	37	61	−24		10–19	17–21	10–21	—

Source: FIBA
Rules for classification: 1) Wins; 2) Head-to-head record; 3) Points scored; 4) Higher seed.

=== Women's ===
==== Group A ====
Pos	Team	Pld	W	L	PF	PA	PD	Qualification	(Philippines)	(Chinese Taipei)	(Samoa)	(Vanuatu)
1	Philippines	3	3	0	59	19	+40	2019 FIBA 3x3 Asia Cup – Group C	—	16–13	21–1	22–5
2	Chinese Taipei	3	2	1	55	23	+32		13–16	—	21–2	21–5
3	Samoa	3	1	2	15	53	−38		1–21	2–21	—	12–11
4	Vanuatu	3	0	3	21	55	−34		5–22	5–21	11–12	—

First match(es) will be played: unknown. Source: FIBA

==== Group B ====
Pos	Team	Pld	W	L	PF	PA	PD	Qualification	(Thailand)	(India)	(Malaysia)	(Maldives)
1	Thailand	3	3	0	51	36	+15	2019 FIBA 3x3 Asia Cup – Group D	—	21–15	18–10	12–11
2	India	3	2	1	49	48	+1		15–21	—	16–15	18–12
3	Malaysia	3	1	2	44	39	+5		10–18	15–16	—	19–5
4	Maldives	3	0	3	28	49	−21		11–12	12–18	5–19	—

First match(es) will be played: unknown. Source: FIBA
