= 2016 FIBA 3x3 Under-18 Asian Championships =

International youth basketball competition

- 2nd FIBA 3x3 Under-18 Asian Championships

Tournament details
- Host nation: Malaysia
- Dates: 22-24 July
- Teams: B:10; G:10
- Champions: Qatar (Boys); Japan (Girls)

Official website
- www.fiba.com/asia/3x3U18/2016

The 2016 FIBA 3x3 Under-18 Asian Championships for Boys and Girls is the second edition of the FIBA Asia's 3x3 championship for boys and girls under the age of 18. The games were held at the Gem In Mall in Cyberjaya, Malaysia from 22-24 July. Qatar and Japan won the boys and girls tournaments respectively.

== Boys ==
=== Preliminary round ===
==== Group A ====
Team	Pld	W	L	PF	PA	PD	Pts
Malaysia	4	3	1	82	63	+19	7
Singapore	4	3	1	77	64	+13	7
Indonesia	4	2	2	73	70	+3	6
Kyrgyzstan	4	2	2	75	73	+2	6
Sri Lanka	4	0	4	42	79	−37	4

Pts Ave
20.5
19.2
18.2
18.8
10.5

==== Group B ====
Team	Pld	W	L	PF	PA	PD	Pts
Qatar	4	4	0	84	46	+38	8
Philippines	4	3	1	78	53	+25	7
Japan	4	2	2	77	75	+2	6
Vietnam	4	1	3	50	74	−24	5
South Korea	4	0	4	33	84	−51	4

Pts Ave
21.0
19.5
19.2
12.5
8.2

=== Knockout round ===
Quarterfinals
Malaysia	21
Vietnam	6
Philippines	21
Indonesia	16
Singapore	10
Japan	12
Qatar	18
Kyrgyzstan	12

Semifinals
Malaysia	20
Philippines	21
Qatar	21
Japan	8

Final
Philippines	9
Qatar	21
3rd place
Malaysia	21
Japan	14

== Girls ==
=== Preliminary round ===
==== Group A ====
Team	Pld	W	L	PF	PA	PD	Pts
Kazakhstan	4	4	0	48	29	+19	8
Malaysia	4	3	1	62	54	+8	7
Singapore	4	2	2	56	56	0	6
Indonesia	4	1	3	61	71	−10	5
Qatar	4	0	4	55	72	−17	4

Pts Ave
12.0
15.5
14.0
15.2
13.8

==== Group B ====
Team	Pld	W	L	PF	PA	PD	Pts
Japan	4	3	1	84	46	+38	7
Vietnam	4	3	1	78	53	+25	7
Sri Lanka	4	2	2	77	75	+2	6
Kyrgyzstan	4	2	2	50	74	−24	6
Philippines	4	0	4	33	84	−51	4

Pts Ave
21.0
19.5
19.2
12.5
8.2

=== Knockout round ===
Quarterfinals
Kazakhstan	13
Kyrgyzstan	9
Vietnam	14
Singapore	15
Malaysia	16
Sri Lanka	3
Japan	13
Indonesia	5

Semifinals
Kazakhstan	17
Singapore	11
Malaysia	10
Japan	18

Final
Kazakhstan	16
Japan	20
3rd place
Singapore	7
Malaysia	16
