= 2026 FIBA 3x3 Asia Cup – Women's tournament =

2026 FIBA 3x3 Asia Cup

Tournament details
- Host country: Singapore
- City: Singapore
- Dates: 1–5 April
- Teams: 21

Final positions
- Champions: Australia (6th title)
- Runners-up: Philippines
- Third place: China

Tournament statistics
- MVP: (Australia) Kristy Wallace

The 2026 FIBA 3x3 Asia Cup – Women's tournament was the ninth edition of this continental championship. The event was held in Singapore from 1 to 5 April 2026.

Australia captured their sixth title after defeating the Philippines in the final.

== Host selection ==
FIBA and Sport Singapore announced on 28 March 2025 the extension of their existing partnership to host a series of events in 2026 and 2027, marking concrete steps to grow the profile of 3x3 basketball within the local sporting community.

== Venue ==
The venue was at the OCBC Square, The Kallang.

2026 FIBA 3x3 Asia Cup – Women's tournament is located in Singapore	Singapore
2026 FIBA 3x3 Asia Cup – Women's tournament is located in Singapore	OCBC Square, The Kallang

== Participating teams ==
All National Federations in the Asia and Oceania region were invited to register a team for the 2024 FIBA 3x3 Asia Cup.

Preliminary round

Pool A

- China (1)
- Thailand (8)
- Qualifier Pool A

Pool B

- Mongolia (2)
- New Zealand (7)
- Qualifier Pool B

Pool C

- Japan (3)
- Singapore (H) (6)
- Qualifier Pool C

Pool D

- Australia (4)
- Philippines (5)
- Qualifier Pool D

Qualifying draw

Pool A

- Kazakhstan (9)
- Vietnam (15)
- South Korea (16)

Pool B

- Malaysia (10)
- Turkmenistan (14)
- India (17)

Pool C

- Chinese Taipei (11)
- Saudi Arabia (13)
- Hong Kong (18)
- Bahrain (21)

Pool D

- Tonga (12)
- Macau (19)
- Maldives (20)

== Qualifying draw ==
The four group winners qualified for the next round.

=== Pool Qualifying Draw A ===
Pos	Team	Pld	W	L	PF	PA	PD	Qualification	(Kazakhstan)	(South Korea)	(Vietnam)
1	Kazakhstan	2	2	0	41	29	+12	Preliminary round		20–17	21–12
2	South Korea	2	1	1	38	31	+7				
3	Vietnam	2	0	2	23	42	−19			11–21	

Source: FIBA
Rules for classification: 1) Wins; 2) Head-to-head record; 3) Points scored.

=== Pool Qualifying Draw B ===
Pos	Team	Pld	W	L	PF	PA	PD	Qualification	(Malaysia)	(India)	(Turkmenistan)
1	Malaysia	2	2	0	37	22	+15	Preliminary round		16–13	21–9
2	India	2	1	1	34	20	+14				
3	Turkmenistan	2	0	2	13	42	−29			4–21	

Source: FIBA
Rules for classification: 1) Wins; 2) Head-to-head record; 3) Points scored.

=== Pool Qualifying Draw C ===
Pos	Team	Pld	W	L	PF	PA	PD	Qualification	(Chinese Taipei)	(Hong Kong)	(Bahrain)	(Saudi Arabia)
1	Chinese Taipei	3	3	0	59	23	+36	Preliminary round			21–4	19–8
2	Hong Kong	3	2	1	52	45	+7		11–19			
3	Bahrain	3	1	2	32	50	−18			14–20		
4	Saudi Arabia	3	0	3	29	54	−25			12–21	9–14	

Source: FIBA
Rules for classification: 1) Wins; 2) Head-to-head record; 3) Points scored.

=== Pool Qualifying Draw D ===
Pos	Team	Pld	W	L	PF	PA	PD	Qualification	(Tonga)	(Macau)	(Maldives)
1	Tonga	2	2	0	28	11	+17	Preliminary round		15–7	13–4
2	Macau	2	1	1	19	24	−5				12–9
3	Maldives	2	0	2	13	25	−12				

Source: FIBA
Rules for classification: 1) Wins; 2) Head-to-head record; 3) Points scored.

== Preliminary round ==
=== Pool A ===
Pos	Team	Pld	W	L	PF	PA	PD	Qualification	(China)	(Thailand)	(Kazakhstan)
1	China	2	2	0	37	27	+10	Knockout stage		16–13	21–14
2	Thailand	2	1	1	34	22	+12	Knockout stage			21–6
3	Kazakhstan	2	0	2	20	42	−22				

Source: FIBA
Rules for classification: 1) Wins; 2) Head-to-head record; 3) Points scored.

=== Pool B ===
Pos	Team	Pld	W	L	PF	PA	PD	Qualification	(Mongolia)	(New Zealand)	(Malaysia)
1	Mongolia	2	2	0	32	16	+16	Knockout stage		12–10	20–6
2	New Zealand	2	1	1	32	16	+16	Knockout stage			22–4
3	Malaysia	2	0	2	10	44	−34				

Source: FIBA
Rules for classification: 1) Wins; 2) Head-to-head record; 3) Points scored.

=== Pool C ===
Pos	Team	Pld	W	L	PF	PA	PD	Qualification	(Japan)	(Singapore)	(Chinese Taipei)
1	Japan	2	2	0	35	22	+13	Knockout stage		21–11	14–11
2	Singapore (H)	2	1	1	30	37	−7	Knockout stage			19–16
3	Chinese Taipei	2	0	2	27	33	−6				

Source: FIBA
Rules for classification: 1) Wins; 2) Head-to-head record; 3) Points scored.
(H) Hosts

=== Pool D ===
Pos	Team	Pld	W	L	PF	PA	PD	Qualification	(Australia)	(Philippines)	(Tonga)
1	Australia	2	2	0	42	13	+29	Knockout stage		21–10	21–3
2	Philippines	2	1	1	29	31	−2	Knockout stage			19–10
3	Tonga	2	0	2	13	40	−27				

Source: FIBA
Rules for classification: 1) Wins; 2) Head-to-head record; 3) Points scored.

== Knockout stage ==
Quarter-finals
5 April
China	16
Singapore	12
5 April
Australia	19
New Zealand	11
5 April
Mongolia	12
Philippines	15
5 April
Japan	15
Thailand	13

Semi-finals
5 April
China	20
Australia	21
5 April
Philippines	21
Japan	19

Final
5 April
Australia	18
Philippines	9
Third place
5 April
China	20
Japan	15

== Final ranking ==
Pos	Team	Pld	W	L	W%	PF	PA
1st place, gold medalist(s)	Australia	5	5	0	100%	100	20.0
2nd place, silver medalist(s)	Philippines	5	3	2	60%	74	14.8
3rd place, bronze medalist(s)	China	5	4	1	80%	93	18.6
4	Japan	5	3	2	60%	84	16.8
5	Mongolia	3	2	1	67%	44	14.7
6	Thailand	3	1	2	33%	47	15.7
7	Singapore	3	1	2	33%	42	14.0
8	New Zealand	3	1	2	33%	42	14.0
9	Chinese Taipei	2	0	2	00%	27	13.5
10	Kazakhstan	2	0	2	00%	20	10.0
11	Tonga	2	0	2	00%	13	06.5
12	Malaysia	2	0	2	00%	10	05.0
Eliminated in Qualifying draw
13	Hong Kong	3	2	1	67%	52	17.3
14	South Korea	2	1	1	50%	38	19.0
15	India	2	1	1	50%	34	17.0
16	Macau	2	1	1	50%	19	09.5
17	Bahrain	3	1	2	33%	32	10.7
18	Vietnam	2	0	2	00%	23	11.5
19	Saudi Arabia	3	0	3	00%	29	09.7
20	Turkmenistan	2	0	2	00%	13	06.5
21	Maldives	2	0	2	00%	13	06.5
