= Australia women's national 3x3 team =

National 3x3 basketball team

Australia
- FIBA ranking: 21
- FIBA zone: FIBA Oceania
- National federation: Basketball Australia
- Coach: Damon Lowery
- Nickname: Gangurrus

Olympic Games
- Appearances: 1

World Cup
- Appearances: 7
- Medals: Silver: (2026); Bronze: (2012, 2023)

Asia Cup
- Appearances: 8
- Medals: Gold: (2017, 2019, 2023, 2024, 2025, 2026); Silver: (2022); Bronze: (2018)
Home	Away
Medal record
Women's 3x3
Representing Australia
World Cup
World Cup
Silver medal – second place	2026 Warsaw	Team
Bronze medal – third place	2012 Athens
Bronze medal – third place	2023 Vienna	Team
Champions Cup
Bronze medal – third place	2025 Bangkok	Team
Asia Cup
Gold medal – first place	2017 Ulaanbaatar
Gold medal – first place	2019 Changsha
Gold medal – first place	2023 Singapore
Gold medal – first place	2024 Singapore
Gold medal – first place	2025 Singapore
Silver medal – second place	2022 Singapore
Bronze medal – third place	2018 Shenzhen
Commonwealth Games
Bronze medal – third place	2022 Birmingham

The Australia women's national 3x3 team is a national basketball team of Australia, governed by Basketball Australia.

In the program's FIBA 3x3 World Cup history, they have won two bronze medals (2012 and 2023) and one silver medal (2026). The team competed at the 2024 Paris Olympics.

== Competitions ==
=== Summer Olympics ===
Year	Position	Pld	W	L	Players
(Japan) 2020 Tokyo	Did not qualify				
(France) 2024 Paris	5th	8	4	4	Wilson, Whittle, Maley, Mansfield
Total	1/2	8	4	4	

=== 3x3 World Cup ===
Year	Position	Pld	W	L	Players
(Greece) 2012 Athens	3rd	9	8	1	Blicavs, Ebzery, Kunek, Madgen
(Russia) 2014 Moscow	Did not qualify				
(China) 2016 Guangzhou	11th	4	3	1	Bowen, Brancatisano, Rocci, Screen
(France) 2017 Nantes	9th	4	2	2	Cole, Mijović, Payne, Todhunter
(Philippines) 2018 Bocaue	Did not qualify				
(Netherlands) 2019 Amsterdam	4th	7	4	3	Cole, Froling, Garrick, Kunek
(Belgium) 2022 Antwerp	Did not qualify				
(Austria) 2023 Vienna	3rd	7	5	2	Maley, Mansfield, Wilson, Whittle
(Mongolia) 2025 Ulaanbaatar	5th	5	4	1	Maley, Sowah, Whittle, Wilson
(Poland) 2026 Warsaw	2nd	8	5	3	Atwell, Clarke, Hank, Whittle
2027 Singapore	To be determined				
Total	7/11	44	31	13	

=== 3x3 Asia Cup ===
Year	Position	Pld	W	L	Players
(Mongolia) 2017 Ulaanbaatar	1st	5	5	0	Bourne, McAppion, Perera, Smith
(China) 2018 Shenzhen	3rd	8	7	1	Cole, Froling, Garrick, Smith
(China) 2019 Changsha	1st	5	5	0	Cole, Garrick, Kunek, Zavecz
2022 Singapore	2nd	5	3	2	Maley, Mansfield, Scherf, Whittle
2023 Singapore	1st	5	5	0	Maley, Mansfield, Whittle, Wilson
2024 Singapore	1st	5	5	0	Maley, Mansfield, Wilson, Whittle
2025 Singapore	1st	5	5	0	Sowah, Maley, Wilson, Whittle
2026 Singapore	1st	5	5	0	
Total	8/8	38	35	3	

=== Commonwealth Games ===
Year	Position	Pld	W	L	Players
(England) 2022 Birmingham	3rd	5	4	1	Scherf, Mansfield, Wilson, Whittle
Total	1/1	5	4	1	

=== Champions Cup ===
Year	Position	Pld	W	L
(Thailand) 2025 Bangkok	3rd	5	3	2
(Thailand) 2026 Bangkok	6th	3	1	2
Total	2/2	8	4	4

== Honours ==
=== Medals table ===
Games	Gold	Silver	Bronze	Total
Olympic Games	0	0	0	0
3x3 World Cup	0	0	2	2
3x3 Asia Cup	5	1	1	7
Commonwealth Games	0	0	1	1
Grand Totals	5	1	4	9

=== Individual awards ===
- FIBA 3x3 Asia Cup MVP
  - Isabelle Bourne – 2017
  - Rebecca Cole – 2019
  - Alex Wilson - 2024
- FIBA 3x3 Asia Cup All-Tournament Team
  - Isabelle Bourne – 2017
  - Rebecca Cole – 2018, 2019
  - Anneli Maley - 2022
  - Alex Wilson - 2024

== See also ==
- Australia men's national 3x3 team
- Australia women's national basketball team
- Australia men's national basketball team
