= 2024 FIBA 3x3 Asia Cup – Women's tournament =

Tournament details
- Host country: Singapore
- City: Singapore
- Dates: 27–31 March
- Teams: 20
- Venue: Singapore Sports Hub OCBC Square

Final positions
- Champions: Australia (4th title)
- Runners-up: New Zealand
- Third place: Mongolia
- Fourth place: Chinese Taipei

Tournament statistics
- MVP: (Australia) Alex Wilson

The 2024 FIBA 3x3 Asia Cup – Women's tournament was the seventh edition of this continental championship. The event was held in Singapore. It will be contested by 20 teams.

Australia are the defending champions.

Australia defended their title after being victorious over New Zealand in the final. Mongolia won their first medal since 2013 after beating first time semifinalists, Chinese Taipei in the bronze medal match.

== Host selection ==
Singapore was given the hosting rights on 3 October 2022 after they signed a three-year contract to host the 2023, 2024 and 2025 editions of the tournament.

== Participating teams ==
All National Federations in the Asia and Oceania region were invited to register a team for the 2024 FIBA 3x3 Asia Cup.

Preliminary round

Pool A

- China (1)
- Chinese Taipei (8)
- Singapore (H) (9)

Pool B

- Japan (2)
- Thailand (7)
- Qualifier Pool A

Pool C

- Mongolia (3)
- Malaysia (6)
- Qualifier Pool B

Pool D

- New Zealand (4)
- Australia (5)
- Qualifier Pool C

Qualifying draw

Pool A

- Iran (10)
- South Korea (15)
- Macau (16)

Pool B

- Philippines (11)
- Kazakhstan (14)
- Maldives (17)
- (French Polynesia) Tahiti (20)

Pool C

- India (12)
- Indonesia (13)
- Hong Kong (18)
- Northern Mariana Islands (19)

== Venue ==
The venue was at the OCBC Square, Singapore Sports Hub.

2024 FIBA 3x3 Asia Cup – Women's tournament is located in Singapore	Singapore
2024 FIBA 3x3 Asia Cup – Women's tournament is located in Singapore	OCBC Square, Singapore Sports Hub

== Medalists ==
Event	Gold	Silver	Bronze
Women's team	Australia; Anneli Maley; Lauren Mansfield; Marena Whittle; Alex Wilson	New Zealand; Gabriella Fotu; Lauryn Hippolite; Esra McGoldrick; Sharne Pupuke-Robati	Mongolia; Bat-Erdeniin Ariuntsetseg; Mönkhsaikhany Tserenlkham; Onolbaataryn Khulan; Ölziibatyn Indra

== Qualifying draw ==
The four group winners qualified for the next round.

=== Pool A ===
Pos	Team	Pld	W	L	PF	PA	PD	Qualification	(Iran)	(South Korea)	(Macau)
1	Iran	2	2	0	30	16	+14	Preliminary round		14–11	16–5
2	South Korea	2	1	1	29	23	+6				18–9
3	Macau	2	0	2	14	34	−20				

Updated to match(es) played on 28 March 2024. Source: FIBA
Rules for classification: 1) Wins; 2) Head-to-head record; 3) Points scored.

=== Pool B ===
Pos	Team	Pld	W	L	PF	PA	PD	Qualification	(Philippines)	(Kazakhstan)	(French Polynesia)	(Maldives)
1	Philippines	3	3	0	61	26	+35	Preliminary round		21–12	21–3	
2	Kazakhstan	3	2	1	43	42	+1				14–10	17–11
3	(French Polynesia) Tahiti	3	1	2	25	41	−16					12–6
4	Maldives	3	0	3	28	48	−20		11–19			

Source: FIBA
Rules for classification: 1) Wins; 2) Head-to-head record; 3) Points scored.

=== Pool C ===
Pos	Team	Pld	W	L	PF	PA	PD	Qualification	(India)	(Hong Kong)	(Indonesia)	(Northern Mariana Islands)
1	India	3	3	0	59	26	+33	Preliminary round			20–13	21–1
2	Hong Kong	3	2	1	47	30	+17		12–18			
3	Indonesia	3	1	2	45	36	+9			10–14		22–2
4	Northern Mariana Islands	3	0	3	5	64	−59			2–21		

Source: FIBA
Rules for classification: 1) Wins; 2) Head-to-head record; 3) Points scored.

== Preliminary round ==
=== Pool A ===
Pos	Team	Pld	W	L	PF	PA	PD	Qualification	(China)	(Chinese Taipei)	(Singapore)
1	China	2	2	0	31	21	+10	quarter-finals		11–9 OT	20–12
2	Chinese Taipei	2	1	1	27	19	+8	quarter-finals			18–8
3	Singapore (H)	2	0	2	20	38	−18				

Source: FIBA
Rules for classification: 1) Wins; 2) Head-to-head record; 3) Points scored.
(H) Hosts

=== Pool B ===
Pos	Team	Pld	W	L	PF	PA	PD	Qualification	(Japan)	(Thailand)	(Iran)
1	Japan	2	2	0	36	32	+4	quarter-finals		19–16	17–16
2	Thailand	2	1	1	32	33	−1	quarter-finals			16–14
3	Iran	2	0	2	30	33	−3				

Source: FIBA
Rules for classification: 1) Wins; 2) Head-to-head record; 3) Points scored.

=== Pool C ===
Pos	Team	Pld	W	L	PF	PA	PD	Qualification	(Philippines)	(Mongolia)	(Malaysia)
1	Philippines	2	2	0	36	18	+18	quarter-finals		17–10	19–8
2	Mongolia	2	1	1	29	23	+6	quarter-finals			21–4
3	Malaysia	2	0	2	14	38	−24				

Source: FIBA
Rules for classification: 1) Wins; 2) Head-to-head record; 3) Points scored.

=== Pool D ===
Pos	Team	Pld	W	L	PF	PA	PD	Qualification	(Australia)	(New Zealand)	(India)
1	Australia	2	2	0	43	16	+27	quarter-finals		22–9	21–7
2	New Zealand	2	1	1	26	32	−6	quarter-finals			17–10
3	India	2	0	2	17	38	−21				

Source: FIBA
Rules for classification: 1) Wins; 2) Head-to-head record; 3) Points scored.

== Knockout stage ==
All times are local.

Quarter-finals
31 March − 11:00
China	7
Mongolia	20
31 March − 11:25
Australia	21
Thailand	8
31 March − 12:45
Japan	14
New Zealand	15
31 March − 13:10
Philippines	9
Chinese Taipei	19

Semi-finals
31 March − 15:05
Mongolia	6
Australia	21
31 March − 15:35
New Zealand	16
Chinese Taipei	15

Final
31 March − 19:20
Australia	18
New Zealand	13
Bronze medal
31 March − 18:30
Mongolia	17
Chinese Taipei	10

== Final standings ==
Pos	Team	Pld	W	L	W%	PF	PA
1	Australia	5	5	0	100%	103	20.6
2	New Zealand	5	3	2	60%	70	14.0
3	Mongolia	5	3	2	60%	72	14.4
4	Chinese Taipei	5	2	3	40%	71	14.2
5	Japan	3	2	1	67%	50	16.7
6	Philippines	3	2	1	67%	45	15.0
7	China	3	2	1	67%	38	12.7
8	Thailand	3	1	2	33%	40	13.3
9	Iran	2	0	2	0%	30	15.0
10	Singapore	2	0	2	0%	20	10.0
11	India	2	0	2	0%	17	8.5
12	Malaysia	2	0	2	0%	14	7.0

Eliminated in the qualifying draw

Pos	Team	Pld	W	L	W%	PF	PA
13	Hong Kong	3	2	1	67%	47	15.7
14	Kazakhstan	3	2	1	67%	43	14.3
15	South Korea	2	1	1	50%	29	14.5
16	Indonesia	3	1	2	33%	45	15.0
17	Tahiti	3	1	2	33%	25	8.3
18	Maldives	3	0	3	0%	28	9.3
19	Macau	2	0	2	0%	14	7.0
20	Northern Mariana Islands	3	0	3	0%	5	1.7

== Awards ==
Team of the tournament
(Australia) Alex Wilson	(New Zealand) Sharne Pupuke-Robati	(Mongolia) Ariuntsetseg Bat-Erdene
Most valuable player
(Australia) Alex Wilson
Top scorer
(Australia) Anneli Maley (31 points)

== See also ==
- 2024 FIBA 3x3 Asia Cup – Men's tournament
- 2024 FIBA 3x3 AmeriCup – Men's tournament
- 2024 FIBA 3x3 AmeriCup – Women's tournament
- 2024 FIBA 3x3 Europe Cup – Men's tournament
- 2024 FIBA 3x3 Europe Cup – Women's tournament
- 2024 FIBA 3x3 Africa Cup – Men's tournament
- 2024 FIBA 3x3 Africa Cup – Women's tournament
