= Basketball at the 2023 SEA Games – Women's 3x3 tournament =

Women's basketball 3x3 tournament at the 2023 SEA Games
- Venue: Morodok Techo Indoor Sports Center
- Dates: 6–7 May 2023
- Nations: 8

Medalists
gold medal	Vietnam
silver medal	Philippines
bronze medal	Indonesia

The women's 3x3 basketball tournament at the 2023 SEA Games was held at the Morodok Techo Indoor Sports Center, Phnom Penh, Cambodia from 6 to 7 May 2023. 8 teams participated in this tournament.

== Participating nations ==
- Cambodia
- Indonesia
- Laos
- Malaysia
- Philippines
- Singapore
- Thailand
- Vietnam

== Results ==
=== Group Stage ===
==== Group A ====
Pos	Team	Pld	W	L	PF	PA	PD	Pts	Qualification
1	Vietnam	3	3	0	59	38	+21	6	Advance to Semi Finals
2	Philippines	3	2	1	54	35	+19	5	Advance to Semi Finals
3	Thailand	3	1	2	42	34	+8	4	
4	Laos	3	0	3	16	64	−48	3	

Source: Cambodia2023

6 May 2023
09:00

Laos	4–21	Thailand
Pts: Oupalavong, Nanthalath 2		Pts: Kitraksa 11

Elephant Hall 2, Morodok Techo National Stadium, Phnom Penh

6 May 2023
09:20

Philippines	19–21	Vietnam
Pts: Animam, Pontejos 5		Pts: Huỳnh 8

Elephant Hall 2, Morodok Techo National Stadium, Phnom Penh

6 May 2023
12:00

Laos	6–21	Philippines

Elephant Hall 2, Morodok Techo National Stadium, Phnom Penh

6 May 2023
12:20

Vietnam	16–13	Thailand

Elephant Hall 2, Morodok Techo National Stadium, Phnom Penh

6 May 2023
15:00

Laos	6–22	Vietnam

Elephant Hall 2, Morodok Techo National Stadium, Phnom Penh

6 May 2023
15:40

Philippines	14–8	Thailand

Elephant Hall 2, Morodok Techo National Stadium, Phnom Penh

==== Group B ====
Pos	Team	Pld	W	L	PF	PA	PD	Pts	Final Result
1	Cambodia (H)	3	3	0	57	35	+22	6	Advance to Semi Finals
2	Indonesia	3	2	1	55	37	+18	5	Advance to Semi Finals
3	Malaysia	3	1	2	43	50	−7	4	
4	Singapore	3	0	3	30	63	−33	3	

Source: Cambodia2023
(H) Hosts

6 May 2023
09:40

Cambodia	22–10	Malaysia
		Pts: Foo 5

Elephant Hall 2, Morodok Techo National Stadium, Phnom Penh

6 May 2023
10:00

Indonesia	21–11	Singapore
Pts: Pierre-Louis 7		Pts: Tan 5

Elephant Hall 2, Morodok Techo National Stadium, Phnom Penh

6 May 2023
12:40

Cambodia	21–12	Singapore

Elephant Hall 2, Morodok Techo National Stadium, Phnom Penh

6 May 2023
13:00

Malaysia	12–21	Indonesia

Elephant Hall 2, Morodok Techo National Stadium, Phnom Penh

6 May 2023
15:20

Cambodia	14–13	Indonesia

Elephant Hall 2, Morodok Techo National Stadium, Phnom Penh

6 May 2023
16:00

Malaysia	21–7	Singapore

Elephant Hall 2, Morodok Techo National Stadium, Phnom Penh

=== Semi finals ===
7 May 2023
09:00

Vietnam	21–18	Indonesia

Elephant Hall 2, Morodok Techo National Stadium, Phnom Penh

7 May 2023
09:20

Cambodia	20–21	Philippines

Elephant Hall 2, Morodok Techo National Stadium, Phnom Penh

=== Bronze medal match ===
7 May 2023
11:00

Indonesia	21–15	Cambodia

Elephant Hall 2, Morodok Techo National Stadium, Phnom Penh

=== Gold medal match ===
7 May 2023
12:00

Vietnam	21–16	Philippines

Elephant Hall 2, Morodok Techo National Stadium, Phnom Penh

== See also ==
- Basketball at the 2023 SEA Games – Men's 3x3 tournament
