= 2025 FIBA 3x3 Asia Cup – Women's tournament =

2025 FIBA 3x3 World Cup
Tournament details
- Host country: Singapore
- City: Singapore
- Dates: 26–30 March
- Teams: 23

Final positions
- Champions: Australia (5th title)
- Runners-up: Japan
- Third place: China
- Fourth place: Philippines

Tournament statistics
- MVP: (Australia) Alex Wilson

The 2025 FIBA 3x3 Asia Cup – Women's tournament was the eighth edition of this continental championship. The event was held in Singapore from 26 to 30 March 2025.

Australia won their fifth title with a win over Japan.

== Host selection ==
Singapore was given the hosting rights on 3 October 2022 after they signed a three-year contract to host the 2023, 2024 and 2025 editions of the tournament.

== Participating teams ==
All National Federations in the Asia and Oceania region were invited to register a team for the 2024 FIBA 3x3 Asia Cup.

Preliminary round

Pool A

- China (1)
- New Zealand (8)
- Qualifier Pool A

Pool B

- Mongolia (2)
- Thailand (7)
- Qualifier Pool B

Pool C

- Japan (3)
- Singapore (H) (6)
- Qualifier Pool C

Pool D

- Australia (4)
- Philippines (5)
- Qualifier Pool D

Qualifying draw

Pool A

- Malaysia (9)
- South Korea (16)
- Bahrain (17)

Pool B

- Chinese Taipei (10)
- India (15)
- Hong Kong (18)
- Guam (23)

Pool C

- Kazakhstan (11)
- Iran (14)
- Vietnam (19)
- Maldives (22)

Pool D

- Indonesia (12)
- Turkmenistan (13)
- Macau (20)
- Papua New Guinea (21)

== Venue ==
The venue was at the OCBC Square, Singapore Sports Hub.

2025 FIBA 3x3 Asia Cup – Women's tournament is located in Singapore	Singapore
2025 FIBA 3x3 Asia Cup – Women's tournament is located in Singapore	OCBC Square, Singapore Sports Hub

== Medalists ==
Event	Gold	Silver	Bronze
Women's team	Australia; Miela Goodchild; Anneli Maley; Marena Whittle; Alex Wilson	Japan; Fatoumanana Nishi; Yuki Noguchi; Fuyuko Takahashi; Aya Tsurumi	China; Hu Duoling; Li Wenxia; Li Yuyan; Zhou Mengyun

== Qualifying draw ==
The four group winners qualified for the next round.

=== Pool QD A ===
Pos	Team	Pld	W	L	PF	PA	PD	Qualification	(South Korea)	(Malaysia)	(Bahrain)
1	South Korea	2	2	0	42	15	+27	Preliminary round			21–5
2	Malaysia	2	1	1	27	33	−6		10–21		17–12
3	Bahrain	2	0	2	17	38	−21				

Source: FIBA
Rules for classification: 1) Wins; 2) Head-to-head record; 3) Points scored.

=== Pool QD B ===
Pos	Team	Pld	W	L	PF	PA	PD	Qualification	(Chinese Taipei)	(Hong Kong)	(India)	(Guam)
1	Chinese Taipei	3	3	0	57	44	+13	Preliminary round			17–13	22–14
2	Hong Kong	3	2	1	55	30	+25		17–19			
3	India	3	1	2	40	46	−6			6–17		21–12
4	Guam	3	0	3	31	63	−32			5–21		

Source: FIBA
Rules for classification: 1) Wins; 2) Head-to-head record; 3) Points scored.

=== Pool QD C ===
Pos	Team	Pld	W	L	PF	PA	PD	Qualification	(Vietnam)	(Iran)	(Kazakhstan)	(Maldives)
1	Vietnam	3	3	0	61	36	+25	Preliminary round			22–12	
2	Iran	3	2	1	58	26	+32		16–19			21–1
3	Kazakhstan	3	1	2	39	44	−5			6–21		21–2
4	Maldives	3	0	3	11	63	−52		8–21			

Source: FIBA
Rules for classification: 1) Wins; 2) Head-to-head record; 3) Points scored.

=== Pool QD D ===
Pos	Team	Pld	W	L	PF	PA	PD	Qualification	(Indonesia)	(Turkmenistan)	(Macau)	(Papua New Guinea)
1	Indonesia	3	2	1	51	33	+18	Preliminary round		13–15		17–5
2	Turkmenistan	3	2	1	47	36	+11				11–12	21–12
3	Macau	3	2	1	45	41	+4		13–22			
4	Papua New Guinea	3	0	3	25	58	−33				8–20	

Source: FIBA
Rules for classification: 1) Wins; 2) Head-to-head record; 3) Points scored.

== Preliminary round ==
The pools were announced on 20 February 2025.

=== Pool A ===
Pos	Team	Pld	W	L	PF	PA	PD	Qualification	(China)	(South Korea)	(New Zealand)
1	China	2	1	1	36	30	+6	Knockout stage		19–12	17–18
2	South Korea	2	1	1	30	28	+2	Knockout stage			
3	New Zealand	2	1	1	27	35	−8			9–18	

Source: FIBA
Rules for classification: 1) Wins; 2) Head-to-head record; 3) Points scored.

=== Pool B ===
Pos	Team	Pld	W	L	PF	PA	PD	Qualification	(Mongolia)	(Thailand)	(Chinese Taipei)
1	Mongolia	2	1	1	32	31	+1	Knockout stage		11–17	21–14
2	Thailand	2	1	1	32	27	+5	Knockout stage			15–16
3	Chinese Taipei	2	1	1	30	36	−6				

Source: FIBA
Rules for classification: 1) Wins; 2) Head-to-head record; 3) Points scored.

=== Pool C ===
Pos	Team	Pld	W	L	PF	PA	PD	Qualification	(Japan)	(Vietnam)	(Singapore)
1	Japan	2	2	0	39	16	+23	Knockout stage		17–10	22–6
2	Vietnam	2	1	1	31	27	+4	Knockout stage			
3	Singapore (H)	2	0	2	16	43	−27			10–21	

Source: FIBA
Rules for classification: 1) Wins; 2) Head-to-head record; 3) Points scored.
(H) Hosts

=== Pool D ===
Pos	Team	Pld	W	L	PF	PA	PD	Qualification	(Australia)	(Philippines)	(Indonesia)
1	Australia	2	2	0	42	11	+31	Knockout stage		21–8	21–3
2	Philippines	2	1	1	29	25	+4	Knockout stage			21–4
3	Indonesia	2	0	2	7	42	−35				

Source: FIBA
Rules for classification: 1) Wins; 2) Head-to-head record; 3) Points scored.

== Knockout stage ==
Quarter-finals
30 March
China	17
Vietnam	15
30 March
Australia	21
Thailand	13
30 March
Mongolia	15
Philippines	19
30 March
Japan	21
South Korea	11

Semi-finals
30 March
China	15
Australia	21
30 March
Philippines	9
Japan	22

Final
30 March
Australia	21
Japan	17
Third place
30 March
China	21
Philippines	11

== Final ranking ==
Rank	Team	Record
1st place, gold medalist(s)	Australia	5–0
2nd place, silver medalist(s)	Japan	4–1
3rd place, bronze medalist(s)	China	3–2
4	Philippines	2–3
5	Mongolia	1–2
6	Vietnam	1–2
7	Thailand	1–2
8	South Korea	1–2
9	Chinese Taipei	1–1
10	New Zealand	1–1
11	Singapore	0–2
12	Indonesia	0–2
Eliminated in Qualifying draw
13	Iran	2–1
14	Hong Kong	2–1
15	Turkmenistan	2–1
16	Macau	2–1
17	Malaysia	1–1
18	India	1–2
19	Kazakhstan	1–2
20	Guam	0–3
21	Bahrain	0–2
22	Papua New Guinea	0–3
23	Maldives	0–3

== Statistics and awards ==
=== Points leaders ===
Rank	Name	Points
1	(Japan) Fuyuko Takahashi	39
2	(China) Zhou Mengyun	37
3	(Australia) Alex Wilson	34
4	(Australia) Marena Whittle	33
5	(Japan) Fatoumanana Nishi	32

=== Awards ===
The awards were announced on 30 March 2025.

All-Star team
(Australia) Alex Wilson
(Japan) Fuyuko Takahashi
(China) Zhou Mengyun
MVP
(Australia) Alex Wilson
