= New Zealand women's national 3x3 team =

National 3x3 basketball team

New Zealand
- FIBA ranking: 56
- FIBA zone: FIBA Asia
- National federation: Basketball New Zealand

World Cup
- Appearances: 3

Asia Cup
- Appearances: 8
- Medals: (2018)
Home	Away
Medal record
Women's 3x3
Representing New Zealand
Asia Cup
Gold medal – first place	2018 Shenzhen

The New Zealand women's national 3x3 team is a national 3x3 basketball team of New Zealand, governed by Basketball New Zealand.

== Competitions ==
=== 3x3 World Cup ===
Year	Position	Pld	W	L	Players
(Greece) 2012 Athens	Did not qualify				
(Russia) 2014 Moscow	Did not qualify				
(China) 2016 Guangzhou	12th	4	3	1	Agnew, Franklin, Jones, Leger-Walker
(France) 2017 Nantes	Did not qualify				
(Philippines) 2018 Bocaue	Did not qualify				
(Netherlands) 2019 Amsterdam	10th	4	2	2	Cocks, Farnworth, Paalvast, Purcell
(Belgium) 2022 Antwerp	15th	4	1	3	Clarke, Fotu, Harmon, Purcel
(Austria) 2023 Vienna	Did not qualify				
(Mongolia) 2025 Ulaanbaatar	Did not qualify				
(Poland) 2026 Warsaw	To be determined				
2027 Singapore	To be determined				
Total	3/11	12	6	6	

=== 3x3 Asia Cup ===
- 2017 – 6th
- 2018 – 1st
- 2019 – 7th
- 2022 – 10th
- 2023 – 2nd
- 2024 – 2nd
- 2025 – 10th
- 2026 – 7th

=== Commonwealth Games ===
Year	Position	Pld	W	L	Players
(England) 2022 Birmingham	4th	5	3	2	—N/a
Total					

== Honours ==
=== Medals table ===
Games	Gold	Silver	Bronze	Total
Olympic Games	0	0	0	0
3x3 World Cup	0	0	0	0
3x3 Asia Cup	1	0	0	1
Commonwealth Games	0	0	0	0
Grand Totals	1	0	0	1

=== Individual awards ===
- FIBA 3x3 Asia Cup MVP
  - Micaela Cocks – 2018
- FIBA 3x3 Asia Cup All-Tournament Team
  - Micaela Cocks – 2018

== See also ==
- New Zealand men's national 3x3 team
- New Zealand women's national basketball team
- New Zealand men's national basketball team
- New Zealand women's national under-18 3x3 team
