= Jack Animam =

Filipino basketball player

Energa Toruń
- Position: Center
- League: BLK

Personal information
- Born: November 27, 1998 (age 27)
- Listed height: 6 ft 4 in (1.93 m)

Career information
- College: NU (2014–2019); SHU (2020–2021)
- Playing career: 2021–present

Career history
- 2021: ŽKK Radnički Kragujevac
- 2023: Toulouse Métropole Basket
- 2023: USO Mondeville Basket
- 2023–24: Wuhan Shengfan
- 2024: Ringwood Hawks
- 2024–2025: FCC UAV Arad
- 2025–2026: Denso Iris
- 2026–present: Energa Toruń

Career highlights
- UBA champion (2021); WJBL champion (2025–26); 5x UAAP champion (2015–2019); UAAP Finals MVP (2018); UAAP MVP (2017); 4x UAAP Mythical Team (2016–2019); UAAP Rookie of the Year (2015)
Medals
Women's basketball
Philippines
SEABA Championship
Gold medal – first place	2016 Malacca City	Team
SEA Games
Gold medal – first place	2019 Philippines	Team
Silver medal – second place	2023 Phnom Penh	Team
Women's 3x3 basketball
SEA Games
Gold medal – first place	2019 Philippines	Team
Silver medal – second place	2023 Phnom Penh	Team

Jack Danielle Santo Tomas Animam (born November 27, 1998) is a Filipina professional basketball player for the Energa Toruń of the Polish Basket Liga Kobiet. She also represents the Philippine national team.

== Early life and education ==
A native of Malolos, Bulacan, Animam was born to Ayo Jackson Animam from Nigeria and Erlinda Santo Tomas. Her mother was an Overseas Filipino Worker.

She reluctantly took up basketball when she was in high school and was just convinced by her school's principal to join their varsity team since they lack players. Animam's hesitation to take up the sport is due to the notion that basketball is a men's sports, and women that do play the sport are lesbians.

Animam studied at the National University (NU) in Manila for her collegiate studies. She entered Shih Hsin University in Taiwan in 2020 to earn a master's degree in public relations as a student-athlete. She wanted to obtain her master's degree at NU, but the university did not offer any master's degree on business administration at that time.

== College career ==
=== National University (Philippines) ===
Animam became skilled enough to be brought to the National University by coach Patrick Aquino while she was still in high school and was included in the NU Lady Bulldogs senior pool, since they don't have a girls' junior program. She became a key player for the NU Lady Bulldogs playing for the team for six years. The Bulldogs won six straight women's basketball UAAP titles with Animam, although Animam herself did not feature in the best of three finals of UAAP Season 82 due to an eye injury. She was also named part of the UAAP Mythical Five four times, won the Rookie of the Year in 2015, given an MVP award in 2017, and was named Finals MVP in 2018.

=== Shin Hsin University ===
In 2019, the Shih Hsin University offered her to play for their team which competes in Taiwan's University Basketball Association (UBA). Amidst the COVID-19 pandemic, she moved to Taiwan in October 2020 and made her debut for the Tigers on November 16, 2020. While playing with the Tigers in the UBA, she had to adjust having been accustomed to a more physical style of play which is more prevalent in the Philippines to lessen her chances of being given a foul. She helped her team clinch the 2020–21 season with a 18–0 win–loss record. Animam helped her team clinch the 2020–21 UBA championship, with the Tigers winning all their 18 games for that season.

== Club career ==
After the 2020–21 UBA season Animam joined United States-based talent agency East West Private (EWP) and went to Ohio to undergo training as part of a long term bid to get into the WNBA. She then suit up for the Zone 6 Celtics in the Atlanta Entertainment Basketball League (AEBL). Animam spent three months of training under Coach Dante Harlan with EWP. She was likewised mentored and advised by fellow basketballer Imani McGee-Stafford.

=== Radnički Kragujevac (2021) ===
In August 2021, Animam joined ŽKK Radnički Kragujevac of the First Women's Basketball League of Serbia under a contract that would last until March 2022. Animam made her debut for Radnički in October 2021. She contributed 20 points in her team's 78–77 win against Proleter 023.

In December 2021, Animam sustained ACL and MCL injuries which made her unavailable for at least six months, effectively ending her 2021–22 season run. In the eight games she did play, Animam recorded an average of 20.0 points and 14.3 rebounds. She went back to the United States to undergo surgery and to recover from her injuries. She would recover and be cleared to play again in October 2022.

=== Toulouse Metropole Basket (2023) ===
Animam returned playing, joining Toulouse Metropole Basket of the Ligue Féminine de Basketball in France in January 2023.

=== Union Sportive Ouvrière Mondeville Basket (2023) ===
After her stint in Toulouse Metropole Basket, She transferred with USO Mondeville in March 2023.

=== Wuhan Shengfan (2023–24) ===
Animam accepted an offer to play for the Wuhan Shengfan of the Women's Chinese Basketball Association while playing for the Philippines in the 2023 FIBA Women's Asia Cup. She played for Shengfan in the 2023–24 season. She played 35 games for Wuhan and had an average record of 11.4 points and 12 rebounds.

=== Ringwood Hawks (2024) ===
In March 2024, Animam moved to Australia to join the Ringwood Hawks of NBL1 South.

=== FCC UAV Arad (2024–2025) ===
Romanian club FCC UAV Arad announced on 28 August 2024 that they have signed in Animam for the 2024–25 season. The team finished third for that season.

=== Denso Iris (2025–2026) ===
Japanese club Denso Iris announced on 17 September 2025 that they have signed in Animam for the Women's Japan Basketball League. She helped Denso win the league title for the 2025–26 season. This is Animam's first professional title.

=== Energa Toruń (2026–) ===
Animam will return to Europe after joining Polish club Energa Toruń of the Basket Liga Kobiet for the 2026–27 season. Her agency, Titus Sports announced the signing on June 25, 2026.

== National team career ==
Animam has represented the Philippines, being the youngest Filipino player at the 2015 FIBA Asia Women's Championship at age 16. She has played for her country in other international basketball competitions such as the 2016 SEABA Championship, and the 2019 Southeast Asian Games. At the 2019 Southeast Asian Games, Animam was two-time gold medalist helping clinch the women's team and women's 3x3 title for the Philippines.

Animam is also part of the national 3x3 team which competed for the Philippines at the 2018 FIBA 3x3 World Cup and the 2019 FIBA 3x3 Asia Cup.

== Advocacy ==
Animam has been an advocate for women's basketball in the Philippines, especially after her 2018 FIBA 3x3 World Cup stint. She has urged for the establishment of a women's league in the Philippines where collegiate women basketball players could continue their career.

== Awards and recognition ==
The Philippine Sportswriters Association conferred Animam the title of Ms. Basketball for its 2019 PSA Annual Awards Night held in early 2020. Animam is the first ever player to be given the recognition by the sports journalist organization.
