= 2016 FIBA 3x3 World Championships – Women's tournament =

2016 FIBA 3x3 World Championships
Tournament details
- Host country: China
- City: Guangzhou
- Dates: 11–15 October 2016
- Teams: 20
- Venue: 1 (in 1 host city)

Final positions
- Champions: Czech Republic (1st title)
- Runners-up: Ukraine
- Third place: United States
- Fourth place: Spain

The women's tournament of the 2016 FIBA 3x3 World Championships hosted in China was contested by 20 teams.

== Participating teams ==
Every FIBA zone except FIBA Africa were represented. The top 20 teams, including the hosts, based on the FIBA National Federation ranking qualified for the tournament.

The pools for the tournament were unveiled on 20 September 2016.

FIBA Asia (5)

- China (12) (hosts)
- Chinese Taipei (18)
- Indonesia (15)
- Japan (11)
- Macau (20)

FIBA Africa (0)

- None

FIBA Oceania (3)

- Australia (17)
- Cook Islands (19)
- New Zealand (16)

FIBA Americas (2)

- Argentina (10)
- United States (14)

FIBA Europe (10)

- Andorra (7)
- Czech Republic (5)
- France (4)
- Hungary (2)
- Italy (3)
- Netherlands (1)
- Poland (9)
- Romania (13)
- Spain (6)
- Ukraine (8)

== Main tournament ==
=== Preliminary round ===
==== Group A ====
Pos	Team	Pld	W	L	PF	PA	PD	Qualification	(Netherlands)	(Ukraine)	(New Zealand)	(Poland)	(Indonesia)
1	Netherlands	4	3	1	62	45	+17	Qualification to knockout stage	—	8–12	—	—	20–11
2	Ukraine	4	3	1	58	44	+14	Qualification to knockout stage	—	—	12–14	13–8	—
3	New Zealand	4	3	1	56	60	−4		9–20	—	—	13–10	—
4	Poland	4	1	3	53	51	+2		13–14	—	—	—	22–11
5	Indonesia	4	0	4	54	83	−29		—	14–21	18–20	—	—

Source: FIBA
Rules for classification: 1) Wins; 2) Head-to-Head record; 3) Points scored; 4) Higher seed.

==== Group B ====
Pos	Team	Pld	W	L	PF	PA	PD	Qualification	(Hungary)	(Argentina)	(Australia)	(Andorra)	(Macau)
1	Hungary	4	3	1	67	36	+31	Qualification to knockout stage	—	—	—	21–8	21–5
2	Argentina	4	3	1	62	42	+20	Qualification to knockout stage	11–14	—	—	—	21–8
3	Australia	4	3	1	62	49	+13		12–11	16–18	—	—	—
4	Andorra	4	1	3	39	60	−21		—	4–12	9–14	—	—
5	Macau	4	0	4	37	80	−43		—	—	11–20	13–18	—

Source: FIBA
Rules for classification: 1) Wins; 2) Head-to-Head record; 3) Points scored; 4) Higher seed.

==== Group C ====
Pos	Team	Pld	W	L	PF	PA	PD	Qualification	(United States)	(Spain)	(Italy)	(Chinese Taipei)	(Japan)
1	United States	4	3	1	75	55	+20	Qualification to knockout stage	—	16–21	—	17–8	—
2	Spain	4	3	1	71	51	+20	Qualification to knockout stage	—	—	—	18–13	18–7
3	Italy	4	3	1	67	52	+15		14–21	15–14	—	—	—
4	Chinese Taipei	4	1	3	45	62	−17		—	—	11–17	—	13–10
5	Japan	4	0	4	35	73	−38		12–21	—	6–21	—	—

Source: FIBA
Rules for classification: 1) Wins; 2) Head-to-Head record; 3) Points scored; 4) Higher seed.

==== Group D ====
Pos	Team	Pld	W	L	PF	PA	PD	Qualification	(France)	(Czech Republic)	(China)	(Romania)	(Cook Islands)
1	France	4	3	1	80	50	+30	Qualification to knockout stage	—	21–13	—	21–10	—
2	Czech Republic	4	3	1	64	56	+8	Qualification to knockout stage	—	—	21–10	—	15–13
3	China (H)	4	3	1	62	64	−2		21–17	—	—	20–17	—
4	Romania	4	1	3	53	61	−8		—	12–15	—	—	14–5
5	Cook Islands	4	0	4	33	61	−28		6–21	—	9–11	—	—

Source: FIBA
Rules for classification: 1) Wins; 2) Head-to-Head record; 3) Points scored; 4) Higher seed.
(H) Hosts

=== Knockout stage ===
Quarter-finals
Netherlands	11
Czech Republic	16
United States	17
Argentina	5
Hungary	13
Spain	21
France	10
Ukraine	21

Semi-finals
Czech Republic	21
United States	18
Spain	15
Ukraine	19

Final
Czech Republic	21
Ukraine	11
Bronze Final
United States	20
Spain	14

== Final standings ==
Rank	Team	Record
1st place, gold medalist(s)	Czech Republic	6–1
2nd place, silver medalist(s)	Ukraine	5–2
3rd place, bronze medalist(s)	United States	5–2
4	Spain	4–3
5	France	3–2
6	Hungary	3–2
7	Netherlands	3–2
8	Argentina	3–2
9	Italy	3–1
10	China	3–1
11	Australia	3–1
12	New Zealand	3–1
13	Poland	1–3
14	Romania	1–3
15	Chinese Taipei	1–3
16	Andorra	1–3
17	Indonesia	0–4
18	Macau	0–4
19	Japan	0–4
20	Cook Islands	0–4

== Awards ==
2016 FIBA 3x3 World Champions – Women's

Czech Republic
1st title
