= 2018 FIBA 3x3 World Cup – Women's tournament =

2018 FIBA 3x3 World Cup
Tournament details
- Host country: Philippines
- City: Bocaue
- Dates: 8–12 June 2018
- Teams: 20
- Venue: 1 (in 1 host city)

Final positions
- Champions: Italy (1st title)
- Runners-up: Russia
- Third place: France
- Fourth place: China

Tournament statistics
- MVP: (Italy) Rae Lin D'Alie

The women's tournament of the 2018 FIBA 3x3 World Cup hosted in Bocaue, Philippines, was contested by 20 teams.

== Participating teams ==
All FIBA continental zones except for FIBA Oceania are represented by at least one team. The top 20 teams, including the hosts, based on the FIBA National Federation ranking qualified for the tournament.

FIBA announced the composition of the pools on April 10, 2018. There was no draw made and the teams were seeded based on their FIBA National Federation rankings as of the April 1, 2018 cut-off date. The top one, two, three, and four teams were placed at the top of Pools A, B, C, and D respectively. The next four teams are placed in reversed order with the top five team placed as the second team of Pool D and the top eight team designated as the second team of Pool A. The remaining eight teams are seeded in a similar manner with the last ranked team placed as the last team of Pool A.

Venezuela was replaced by Indonesia.

FIBA Asia (7)

- China (1)
- Kazakhstan (9)
- Iran (10)
- Indonesia (15)
- Malaysia (16)
- Turkmenistan (17)
- Philippines (20) (hosts)

FIBA Africa (1)

- Uganda (19)

FIBA Americas (2)

- ~~Venezuela~~
- United States (13)
- Argentina (18)

FIBA Europe (10)

- Andorra (2)
- Hungary (3)
- Netherlands (4)
- Russia (5)
- France (6)
- Czech Republic (7)
- Italy (8)
- Germany (11)
- Spain (12)
- Switzerland (14)

== Players ==
| Team | Players | | | |
|---|---|---|---|---|
| Andorra | Claudia Brunet | Alba Pla Marsiñach | Carla Puntí Saavedra | Eva Vilarrubra Seira |
| Argentina | Julieta Belen Ale | Victoria Llorente | Julieta Mungo | Brenda Schmidt |
| China | Jiang Jiayin | Li Yingyun | Sun Li | Zhang Zhiting |
| Czech Republic | Romana Hejdová | Kristýna Minarovičová | Andrea Ovsíková | Romana Stehlíková |
| France | Christelle Diallo | Alice Nayo | Johanna Tayeau | Marie-Ève Paget |
| Germany | Wiebke Bruns | Lara Müller | Luana Rodefeld | Laura Zdravevska |
| Hungary | Bettina Bozóki | Dóra Medgyessy | Krisztina Süle | Alexandra Theodorean |
| Indonesia | Yusranie Noory Assipalma | Husna Aulia Latifah | Jovita Elizabeth | Fanny Kalamuta |
| Iran | Saiedeh Elli | Masoumeh Esmaeilzadeh Soudjani | Mozhgan Khodadadi | Kimiya Yazdian Tehrani |
| Italy | Giulia Ciavarella | Rae Lin D'Alie | Marcella Filippi | Giulia Rulli |
| Kazakhstan | Oxana Ivanova | Nadezhda Kondrakova | Zalina Kurazova | Tamara Yagodkina |
| Malaysia | Ky Lie Hiew | Wei Yin Saw | Chiau Teng Ting | Fook Yee Yap |
| Netherlands | Sharon Beld | Loyce Bettonvil | Jacobine Klerx | Karin Kuijt |
| Philippines | Jack Danielle Animam | Afril Bernardino | Gemma Miranda | Janine Pontejos |
| Russia | Anna Leshkovtseva | Anastasia Logunova | Tatiana Petrushina | Alexandra Stolyar |
| Spain | Aitana Cuevas Mediavilla | Vega Gimeno Martínez | Nuria Martínez Prat | Paula Palomares |
| Switzerland | Nancy Fora | Marielle Giroud | Evita Herminjard | Cinzia Tomezzoli |
| Turkmenistan | Ayna Gokova | Leyla Halilova | Anastasia Hydyrova | Nigyara Nagiyeva |
| Uganda | Sarah Ageno | Claire Gloria Lamunu | Jamilah Nansikombi | Imanishimwe Ritah |
| United States | Erin Boley | Otiona Gildon | Ruthy Hebard | Sabrina Ionescu |

== Main tournament ==
=== Preliminary round ===
==== Pool A ====
| Pos | Team | Pld | W | L | PF | PA | PD | Qualification | (Czech Republic) | (Italy) | (Turkmenistan) | (Malaysia) | (Indonesia) |
|---|---|---|---|---|---|---|---|---|---|---|---|---|---|
| 1 | Czech Republic | 4 | 3 (Note: Czech Republic 21–20 Italy) | 1 | 83 | 64 | +19 | Qualification to knockout stage | — | 21–20 | 22–11 | 18–22 | 22–11 |
| 2 | Italy | 4 | 3 | 1 | 83 | 45 | +38 | Qualification to knockout stage | 20–21 | — | 22–10 | 22–9 | 19–5 |
| 3 | Turkmenistan | 4 | 2 (Note: Malaysia 14–18 Turkmenistan) | 2 | 59 | 69 | −10 | | 11–22 | 10–22 | — | 18–14 | 20–11 |
| 4 | Malaysia | 4 | 2 | 2 | 66 | 72 | −6 | | 22–18 | 9–22 | 14–18 | — | 21–14 |
| 5 | Indonesia | 4 | 0 | 4 | 41 | 82 | −41 | | 11–22 | 5–19 | 11–20 | 14–21 | — |

Source: FIBA
Rules for classification: 1) Wins; 2) Head-to-head record; 3) Points scored; 4) Higher seed.

==== Pool B ====
| Pos | Team | Pld | W | L | PF | PA | PD | Qualification | (China) | (France) | (Switzerland) | (Argentina) | (Kazakhstan) |
|---|---|---|---|---|---|---|---|---|---|---|---|---|---|
| 1 | China | 4 | 4 | 0 | 74 | 51 | +23 | Qualification to knockout stage | — | 16–14 | 21–20 | 22–4 | 15–13 |
| 2 | France | 4 | 3 | 1 | 75 | 51 | +24 | Qualification to knockout stage | 14–16 | — | 21–16 | 19–9 | 21–10 |
| 3 | Switzerland | 4 | 2 | 2 | 63 | 64 | −1 | | 20–21 | 16–21 | — | 11–8 | 16–14 |
| 4 | Argentina | 4 | 1 | 3 | 31 | 61 | −30 | | 4–22 | 9–19 | 8–11 | — | 10–9 |
| 5 | Kazakhstan | 4 | 0 | 4 | 46 | 62 | −16 | | 13–15 | 10–21 | 14–16 | 9–10 | — |

Source: FIBA
Rules for classification: 1) Wins; 2) Head-to-head record; 3) Points scored; 4) Higher seed.

==== Pool C ====
| Pos | Team | Pld | W | L | PF | PA | PD | Qualification | (United States) | (Russia) | (Uganda) | (Iran) | (Andorra) |
|---|---|---|---|---|---|---|---|---|---|---|---|---|---|
| 1 | United States | 4 | 4 | 0 | 85 | 35 | +50 | Qualification to knockout stage | — | 21–13 | 22–9 | 21–7 | 21–6 |
| 2 | Russia | 4 | 3 | 1 | 78 | 50 | +28 | Qualification to knockout stage | 13–21 | — | 22–8 | 22–12 | 21–9 |
| 3 | Uganda | 4 | 2 | 2 | 53 | 66 | −13 | | 9–22 | 8–22 | — | 18–10 | 18–12 |
| 4 | Iran | 4 | 1 | 3 | 50 | 73 | −23 | | 7–21 | 12–22 | 10–18 | — | 21–12 |
| 5 | Andorra | 4 | 0 | 4 | 39 | 81 | −42 | | 6–21 | 9–21 | 12–18 | 12–21 | — |

Source: FIBA
Rules for classification: 1) Wins; 2) Head-to-head record; 3) Points scored; 4) Higher seed.

==== Pool D ====
| Pos | Team | Pld | W | L | PF | PA | PD | Qualification | (Spain) | (Hungary) | (Netherlands) | (Germany) | (Philippines) |
|---|---|---|---|---|---|---|---|---|---|---|---|---|---|
| 1 | Spain | 4 | 3 | 1 | 69 | 56 | +13 | Qualification to knockout stage | — | 19–14 | 11–13 | 18–12 | 21–17 |
| 2 | Hungary | 4 | 3 | 1 | 68 | 61 | +7 | Qualification to knockout stage | 14–19 | — | 20–14 | 16–13 | 18–15 |
| 3 | Netherlands | 4 | 3 | 1 | 64 | 50 | +14 | | 13–11 | 14–20 | — | 16–8 | 21–11 |
| 4 | Germany | 4 | 1 | 3 | 45 | 60 | −15 | | 12–18 | 13–16 | 8–16 | — | 12–10 |
| 5 | Philippines | 4 | 0 | 4 | 53 | 72 | −19 | | 17–21 | 15–18 | 11–21 | 10–12 | — |

Source: FIBA
Rules for classification: 1) Wins; 2) Head-to-head record; 3) Points scored; 4) Higher seed.

=== Knockout stage ===
Quarter-finals
Czech Republic (7) | 14
Russia (5) | 21
Spain (12) | 17
France (6) | 19
China (1) | 17
Hungary (3) | 14
United States (13) | 14
Italy (8) | 17

Semi-finals
Russia (5) | 19
France (6) | 17
China (1) | 13
Italy (8) | 15

Final
Russia (5) | 12
Italy (8) | 16
Third place
France (6) | 21
China (1) | 14

== Final standings ==
| Rank | Team | Record |
|---|---|---|
| 1st place, gold medalist(s) | Italy | 6–1 |
| 2nd place, silver medalist(s) | Russia | 5–2 |
| 3rd place, bronze medalist(s) | France | 5–2 |
| 4 | China | 5–2 |
| 5 | United States | 4–1 |
| 6 | Czech Republic | 3–2 |
| 7 | Spain | 3–2 |
| 8 | Hungary | 3–2 |
| 9 | Netherlands | 3–1 |
| 10 | Switzerland | 2–2 |
| 11 | Turkmenistan | 2–2 |
| 12 | Uganda | 2–2 |
| 13 | Malaysia | 2–2 |
| 14 | Iran | 1–3 |
| 15 | Germany | 1–3 |
| 16 | Argentina | 1–3 |
| 17 | Philippines | 0–4 |
| 18 | Kazakhstan | 0–4 |
| 19 | Indonesia | 0–4 |
| 20 | Andorra | 0–4 |

== Awards ==
2018 FIBA 3x3 World Champions – Women's

Italy
1st title

=== Individual ===
Most Valuable Player

- (Italy) Rae Lin D'Alie

Team of the Tournament

- (Russia) Anna Leshkovtseva
- (China) Li Yingyun
- (Italy) Rae Lin D'Alie

Contest winners

- Skills: (Hungary) Alexandra Theodorean
- Shoot-out (Mixed): (Philippines) Janine Pontejos
