= Madeleine Garrick =

Australian basketball player (born 1992)

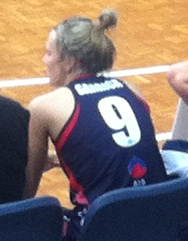
- Garrick in 2012

Free agent
- Position: Guard

Personal information
- Born: 1 April 1992 (age 34) Shepparton, Victoria
- Listed height: 5 ft 11 in (1.80 m)

Career information
- Playing career: 2009–present

Career history
- 2009–2010: Australian Institute of Sport
- 2009–2010: Bendigo Spirit
- 2010–2012: Australian Institute of Sport
- 2012–2015: Bendigo Spirit
- 2015–2019: Melbourne Boomers
- 2019: Botaş SK
- 2019–2020: Melbourne Boomers
- 2021–2022: Bendigo Spirit
- 2022–2023: Pallacanestro Valdarno
- 2023: Libertadores de Querétaro
- 2023–2024: Brixia Basket
- 2024: Adelitas de Chihuahua
- 2024–2025: Charnay

Career highlights
- 2x WNBL champion (2013, 2014)
Medals
Representing Australia
Basketball
FIBA Asia Cup
Silver medal – second place	2017 India
FIBA 3x3 Asia Cup
Bronze medal – third place	2018 Shenzhen, China
Gold medal – first place	2019 Changsha, China
FIBA 3X3 WOMEN'S SERIES
Gold medal – first place	2019 Chengdu, China
NBL Pro Hustle
Silver medal – second place	2018 Hustle I Melbourne, Australia
Silver medal – second place	2018 Hustle II Melbourne, Australia

Madeleine Claire Garrick (born 1 April 1992) is an Australian professional basketball player who competed in the Women's National Basketball League (WNBL). Garrick represented Australia in the 2017 FIBA Women's Asia Cup and 2019 FIBA 3x3 Asia Cup.

== Biography ==
Working her way up through the junior ranks at Bulleen Boomers , Garrick played for Vic Country at the U16 and U18 AJC's before grabbing a spot with Bendigo Spirit in the WNBL as a 17-year-old.

She earned gold at the Australian Youth Olympic Festival in 2009 and although she only played in three games, gained valuable experience at the 2011 U19 World Championships where Australia finished fourth.

Back in the WNBL, Garrick made the move to the AIS where she received more court time and honed her skills. She returned to the Spirit in 2012 and was a part of back-to-back Championships in 2012–13 and 2013–14.

Closing in on 100 SEABL matches, the two-guard had a breakout season in 2014 and averaged 19 points, seven rebounds, and two assists to earn the MVP. Since 2015, Garrick has represented the Melbourne Boomers where her point production has rapidly increased to average double-figures in scoring over the past two seasons.

She has also shot at least 37% from the three-point line and her form earned her a spot with the Australian Opals at the FIBA Women's Asia Cup in 2017 when they won the silver medal.

== Career ==
=== Bendigo Spirit ===
Prior to playing for Australian Institute of Sport, she played for the Bendigo Spirit. Her first WNBL game was with the Spirit when she was part of the squad for the 2009/2010 season opener against the Dandenong Rangers. She has committed to play for the Lady Braves during the 2012 SEABL season.

=== Australian Institute of Sport ===
In a 16 October 2010 loss to the Canberra Capitals, she was the Australian Institute of Sport's second leading scorer with ten points. In a 24 November 2010 game against the Canberra Capitals, she was second on the team in scoring.

=== Melbourne Boomers ===
Garrick, the two-time Championship winner in her fourth season with the Boomers, celebrated her 200th WNBL game when she stepped on the court for the Deakin Melbourne Boomers against Sydney at the State Basketball Centre.

=== Career abroad ===
Garrick played for clubs in several countries throughout her professional career, including Botaş SK in Turkey in 2019, before returning to Melbourne Boomers and Bendigo Spirit in Australia until 2022, followed by Pallacanestro Valdarno and Brixia Basket in Italy, Libertadores de Querétaro and Adelitas de Chihuahua in Mexico, and Charnay in France.

== Personal life ==
Garrick was engaged to Australian influencer Sophie Cachia in 2022.

== Honors ==
- FIBA 3x3 WS Chengdu Stop Chengdu, China: 2019 (GOLD)
- FIBA 3x3 Asia Cup Changsha, China : 2019 (GOLD)
- NBL Pro Hustle II Melbourne, Australia: 2018 (SILVER)
- FIBA 3x3 Asia Cup Shenzhen, China : 2018 (BRONZE)
- NBL Pro Hustle I Melbourne, Australia: 2018 (SILVER)
- FIBA Women's Asia Cup: 2017 (SILVER)
- FIBA U19 World Championship: 2011
- Australian Youth Olympic Festival: 2009 (GOLD)
- FIBA Oceania Youth Tournament: 2008
