= Mio Shinozaki =

Japanese basketball player

Mio Shinozaki 篠崎澪
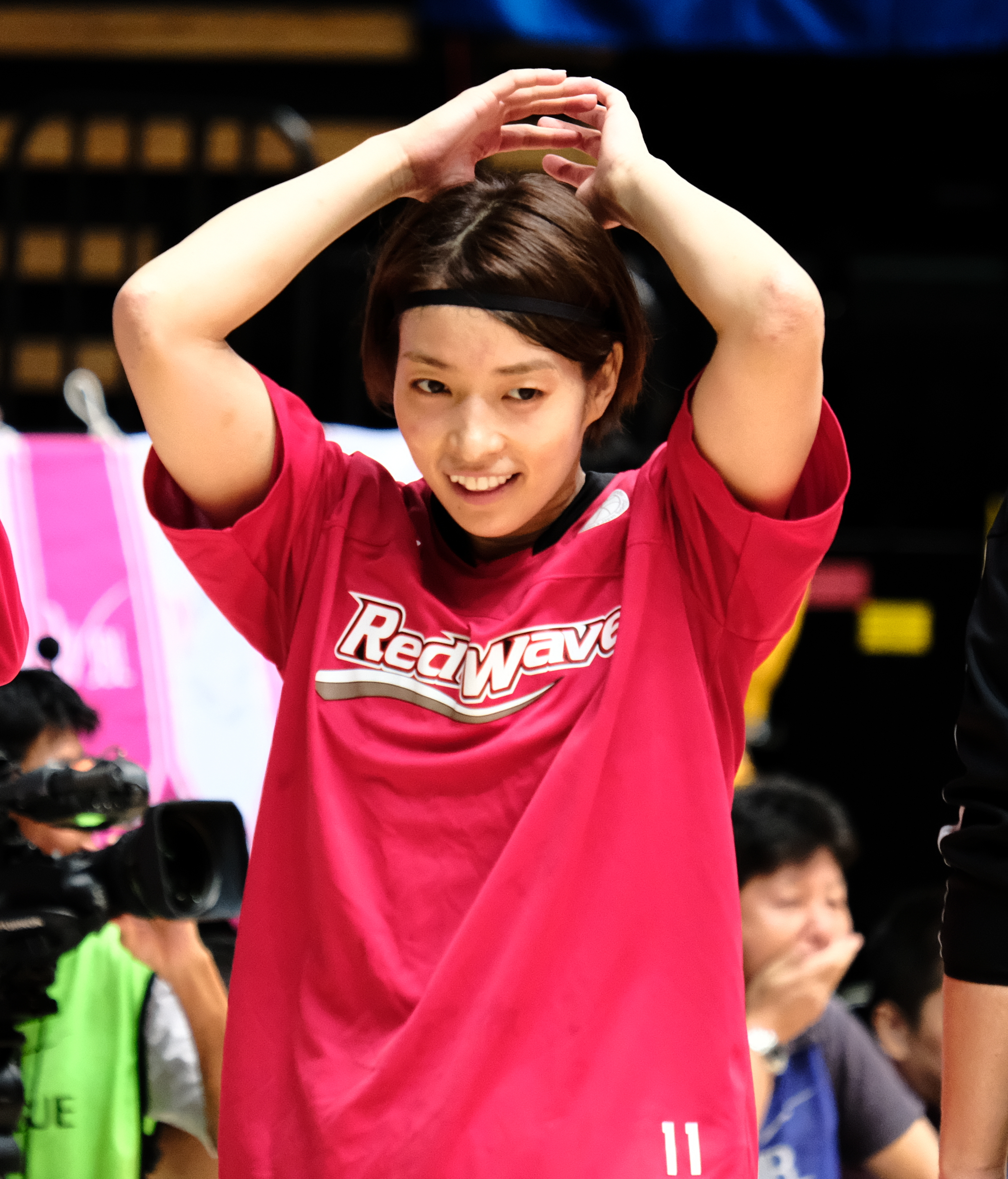

No. 11 – Fujitsu Red Wave
- Position: Guard
- League: Women's Japan Basketball League, FIBA 3X3

Personal information
- Born: September 12, 1991 (age 35) Yokohama, Japan
- Listed height: 5 ft 6 in (1.68 m)
- Listed weight: 146 lb (66 kg)

Career information
- High school: Kanazawa Sogo (Kanazawa-ku, Yokohama)
- Playing career: 2014–present

Career history
- 2014-present: Fujitsu Red Wave

Career highlights
Medals
Women's basketball
Representing Japan
Asian Games
Bronze medal – third place	2018 Jakarta	Japan
FIBA Asia Women's Championship
Gold medal – first place	2015 Wuhan	Japan women's
FIBA Asia 3x3 Cup
Bronze medal – third place	2019 Changsha	Japan 3x3

Mio Shinozaki (篠崎澪, Shinozaki Mio; born September 12, 1991), is a Japanese professional basketball player who plays for Fujitsu Red Wave of the Women's Japan Basketball League. Before joining Fujitsu, she played for Shoin University and won All Japan Intercollegiate Basketball Championship tournament in 2013. She was also selected as a MVP for this Championship tournament. She also played for Japan women's national 3x3 team.
