= Czech Republic women's national 3x3 team =

Basketball team

Czech Republic
- FIBA zone: FIBA Europe

World Cup
- Appearances: 9
- Medals: Gold: 2016

Europe Cup
- Appearances: 6

The Czech Republic women's national 3x3 team is the 3x3 basketball team representing the Czech Republic in international women's competitions, organized and run by the Czech Basketball Federation.

== Competitions ==
=== Summer Olympics ===
Year	Position	Pld	W	L
(Japan) 2020 Tokyo	Did not qualify			
(France) 2024 Paris	Did not qualify			
Total	0/2	0	0	0

=== World Cup ===
Year	Position	Pld	W	L	Players
(Greece) 2012 Athens	6th	7	4	3	Hartigová, Křížová, Uhrová, Vorlová
(Russia) 2014 Moscow	4th	10	8	2	Bortelová, Hartigová, Reisingerová, Zohnová
(China) 2016 Guangzhou	1st	7	6	1	Krumpholcová, Novotná, Uhrová, Vorlová
(France) 2017 Nantes	7th	5	3	2	Minarovičová, Novotná, Uhrová, Vorlová
(Philippines) 2018 Bocaue	6th	5	3	2	Hejdová, Minarovičová, Ovsíková, Stehlíková
(Netherlands) 2019 Amsterdam	9th	4	2	2	Klaudová, Marečková, Minarovičová, Vorlová
(Belgium) 2022 Antwerp	Did not qualify				
(Austria) 2023 Vienna	10th	5	3	2	Galíčková, Levínská, Rylichová, Šotolová
(Mongolia) 2025 Ulaanbaatar	13th	4	1	3	Brabencová, Galíčková, Malíková, Šotolová
(Poland) 2026 Warsaw	12th	5	2	3	Fučíková, Galíčková, Šotolová, Svatoňová
2027 Singapore	To be determined				
Total	9/11	52	32	20	

=== Europe Cup ===
Year	Position	Pld	W	L
(Romania) 2014 Bucharest	12th	3	1	2
(Romania) 2016 Bucharest	5th	3	2	1
(Netherlands) 2017 Amsterdam	9th	2	0	2
(Romania) 2018 Bucharest	8th	3	1	2
(Hungary) 2019 Debrecen	Did not qualify			
(France) 2021 Paris	Did not qualify			
(Austria) 2022 Graz	Did not qualify			
(Israel) 2023 Jerusalem	7th	3	1	2
(Austria) 2024 Vienna	Did not qualify			
(Denmark) 2025 Copenhagen	Did not qualify			
(Belgium) 2026 Antwerp	8th	3	1	2
Total	6/11	17	6	11

== See also ==
- Czech Republic women's national basketball team
- Czech Republic men's national 3x3 team
