= 2027 FIBA 3x3 World Cup =

Tournament details
- Host country: Singapore
- Dates: June
- Teams: 40 (from 5 confederations)
- Venue: 1 (in 1 host city)

The 2027 FIBA 3x3 World Cup will be the 11th edfition of the tournament, an international 3x3 basketball event that features competitions for men's and women's national teams. The tournament will be held between in June 2027 in Singapore.

== Venue ==
The venue will be at the OCBC Square, The Kallang.

2027 FIBA 3x3 World Cup is located in Singapore	Singapore
2027 FIBA 3x3 World Cup is located in Singapore	OCBC Square, The Kallang

== Medal summary ==
=== Medalists ===
Event	Gold	Silver	Bronze
Men			
Women			
