= Minami Iju =

Japanese basketball player

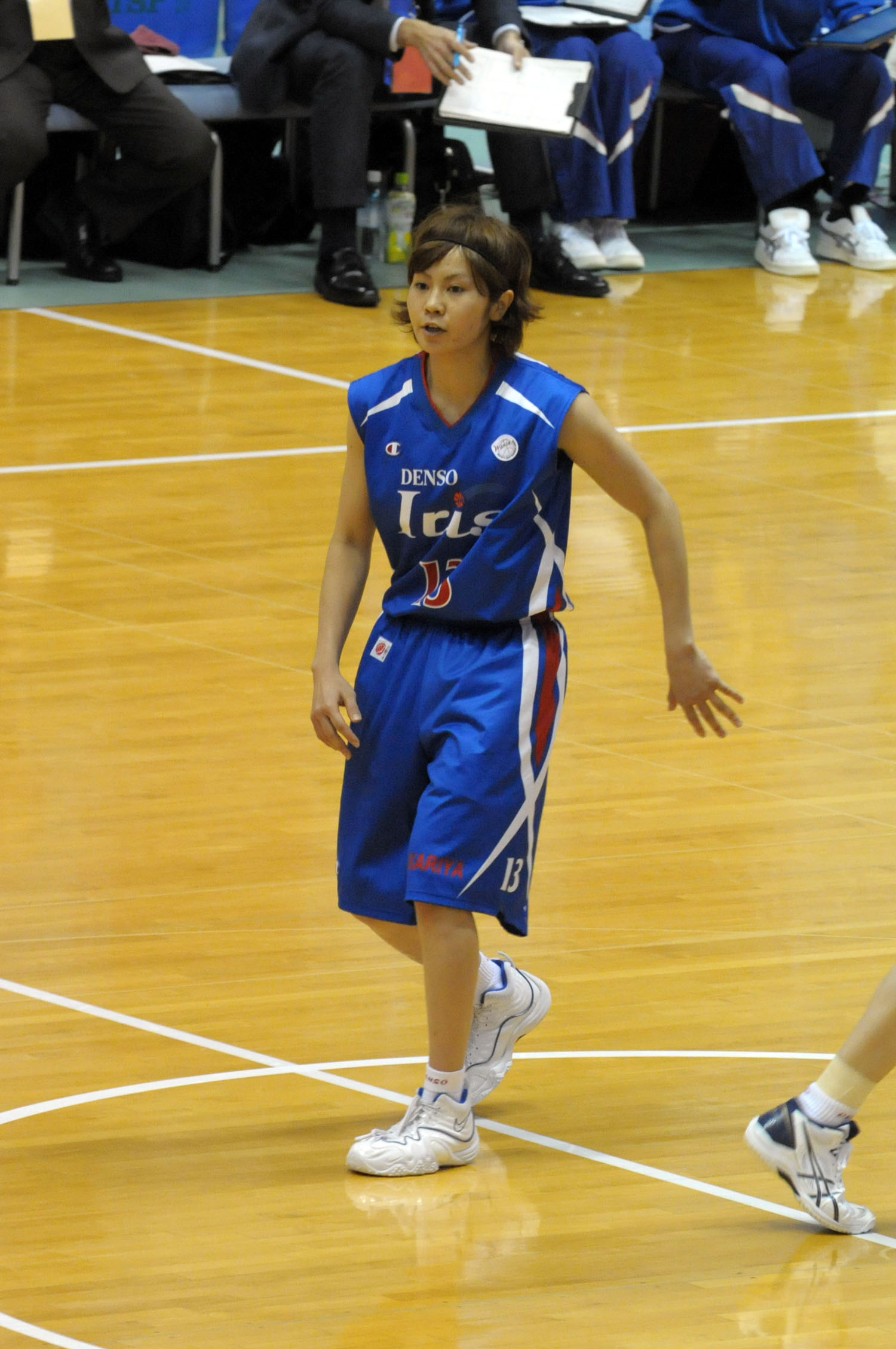

Personal information
- Born: October 3, 1990 (age 36) Yaese, Okinawa
- Listed height: 5 ft 6 in (1.68 m)
- Listed weight: 128 lb (58 kg)

Career information
- High school: Itoman (Itoman, Okinawa)
- College: University of Tsukuba
- Playing career: 2013–2020
- Position: Guard

Career history
- 2013-2020: Denso Iris

Career highlights
- WJBL Rookie of the Year (2014)
Medals
Women's basketball
Representing Japan
FIBA Asia 3x3 Cup
Bronze medal – third place	2019 Changsha	Japan 3x3

Minami Iju (伊集南, Iju Minami; born October 3, 1990) is a Japanese former basketball player who played for Denso Iris of the Women's Japan Basketball League . She also played for Japan women's national 3x3 team.
