= Kiho Miyashita =

Japanese basketball player

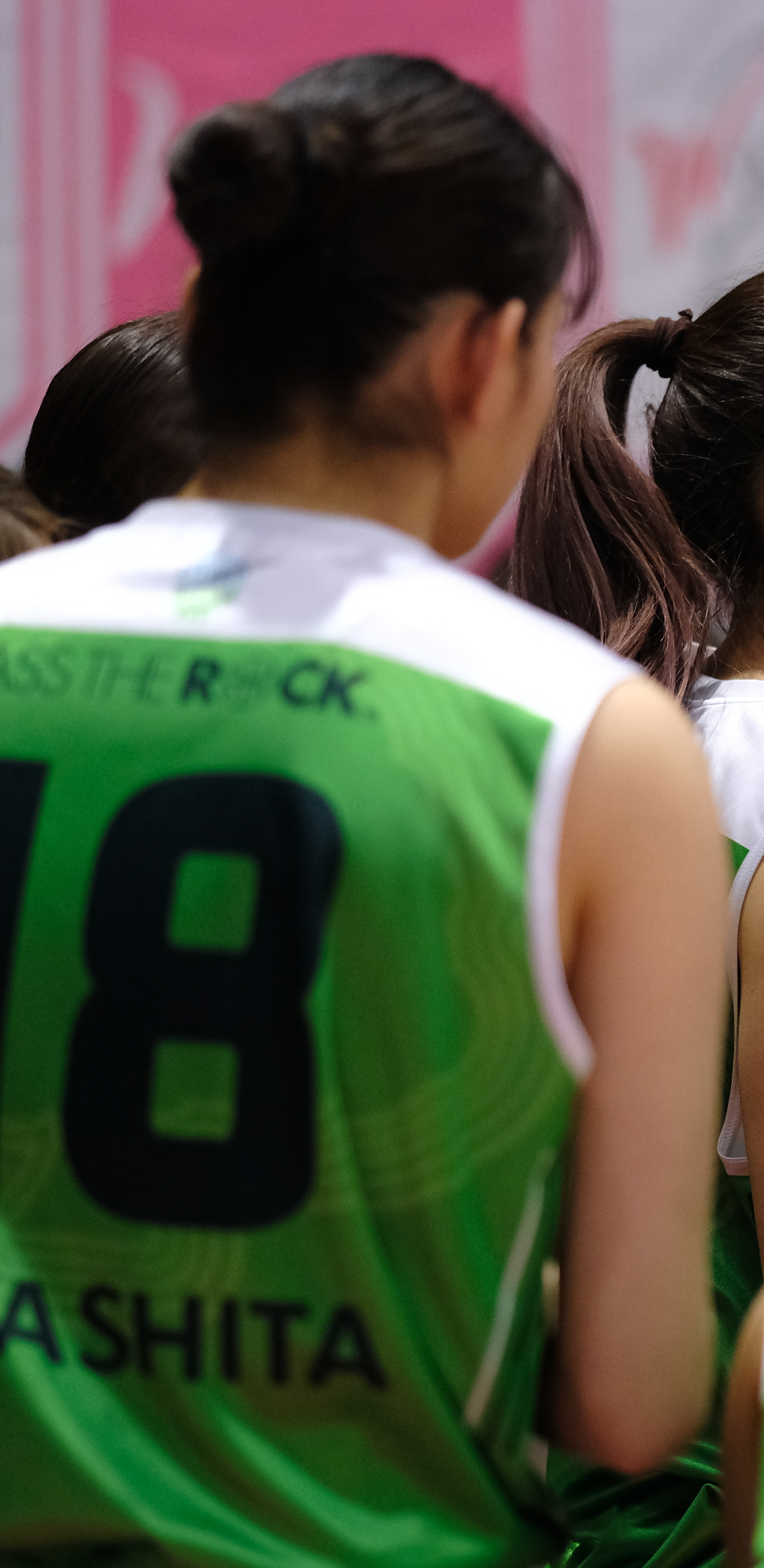

No. 18 – Aisin AW Wings
- Position: Forward
- League: Women's Japan Basketball League

Personal information
- Born: October 6, 1998 (age 28) Hakusan, Ishikawa
- Listed height: 5 ft 11 in (1.80 m)
- Listed weight: 161 lb (73 kg)

Career information
- High school: Asuwa (Fukui, Fukui)
- Playing career: 2017–present

Career history
- 2017-present: Aisin AW Wings
Medals
Women's basketball
Representing Japan
FIBA Asia Cup
Gold medal – first place	2021 Jordan
Asia U-18 Championship
Silver medal – second place	2016 Bangkok	Team
Women's 3x3 basketball
Representing Japan
Asian Games
Silver medal – second place	2018 Jakarta (3x3)	Team
FIBA Asia 3x3 Cup
Bronze medal – third place	2019 Changsha
FIBA 3x3 Women's Series
Gold medal – first place	2019 Xiong An	Team

Kiho Miyashita (宮下希保, Miyashita Kiho; born October 6, 1998) is a Japanese basketball player who plays for Aisin AW Wings of the Women's Japan Basketball League . She also plays for Japan women's national 3x3 team.
