= 2024 FIBA 3x3 Asia Cup =

The 2024 FIBA 3x3 Asia Cup consists of two sections:

- 2024 FIBA 3x3 Asia Cup – Men's tournament
- 2024 FIBA 3x3 Asia Cup – Women's tournament
