= Iran women's national 3x3 team =

National 3x3 basketball team

Iran
- FIBA zone: FIBA Asia

FIBA 3x3 World Championships
- Medals: 1

FIBA Asia 3x3 Cup
- Appearances: 5

The Iran women's national 3x3 team is a national basketball team of Iran, administered by the Islamic Republic of Iran Basketball Federation.

== History ==
They competed in the first international tournament in 2017 after appearing in the 2017 Asian Indoor and Martial Arts Games.

Iran provided one of the upsets of the FIBA 3x3 World Cup 2019 with a 19-18 victory over No.2 seed Mongolia. It was their only victory in Amsterdam but proved to be a triumph for a team whose success has important ramifications in Iran. As of May 2021, they were the No.4 ranked team in Asia.

== Competitions ==
=== FIBA 3x3 World Cup ===
2019 FIBA 3x3 World Cup - Shadi Abdolvand take bronze in Skills contest.

=== Asian Games ===
3x3 basketball at the 2018 Asian Games – Women

=== Basketball at the Summer Youth Olympics ===
3x3 basketball at the 2018 Summer Youth Olympics

=== Islamic Games ===
3x3 basketball at the 2021 Islamic Solidarity Games - 6th

=== Asian Indoor and Martial Arts Games ===
Year	Rank	M	W	L	PF	PA	PD	Ref
(Turkmenistan) 2017	5/12	3	2	1	44	33	+11	

2017 Players: Vakili, Mahmoudi, Kakavanpour, Artounian

=== FIBA 3x3 Asia Cup ===
Year	Rank	M	W	L	PF	PA	PD	Ref
(Qatar) 2013	DNQ (By Ranking)							
(Mongolia) 2017	DNQ (By Ranking)							
(China) 2018	11/18	2	0	2	19	42	-23	
(China) 2019	9/18	2	0	2	30	38	-8	
(Singapore) 2022	23/23	2	0	2	0	0	0	
(Singapore) 2023	9/18	2	0	2	26	37	-11	
(Singapore) 2024	9/20	4	2	2	60	49	+11	
Total	5/7	12	2	10	135	166	-31	

- 2022: Did Not Competed (Visa Problem).

== Results ==
=== 2017 ===
1. Iran 21-4 Afghanistan
2. Iran 16-15 Chinese Taipei
3. Iran 7-14 Turkmenistan

=== 2018 ===
1. Iran 3-22 Australia
2. Iran 16-20 Japan

=== 2019 ===
1. Iran 14-21 Thailand
2. Iran 16-17 Turkmenistan

=== 2022 ===
1. Iran 0-0 South Korea
2. Iran 0-0 Indonesia

=== 2023 ===
1. Iran 14-16 Philippines
2. Iran 12-21 China

=== 2024 ===
1. Iran 16-5 Macau
2. Iran 14-11 South Korea
3. Iran 16-17 Japan
4. Iran 14-16 Thailand

== Roster ==
=== 2017 ===
The following is Iran's roster for the 2017 Asian Indoor and Martial Arts Games:

- Delaram Vakili
- Rozhano Mahmoudi
- Gelareh Kakavanpour
- S.Aireian Artounian

== See also ==
- Iran women's national basketball team
- Iran men's national 3x3 team
- FIBA 3x3 U17 Asia Cup
- Italy women's national 3x3 team
