= Hanna Zavecz =

Australian basketball player

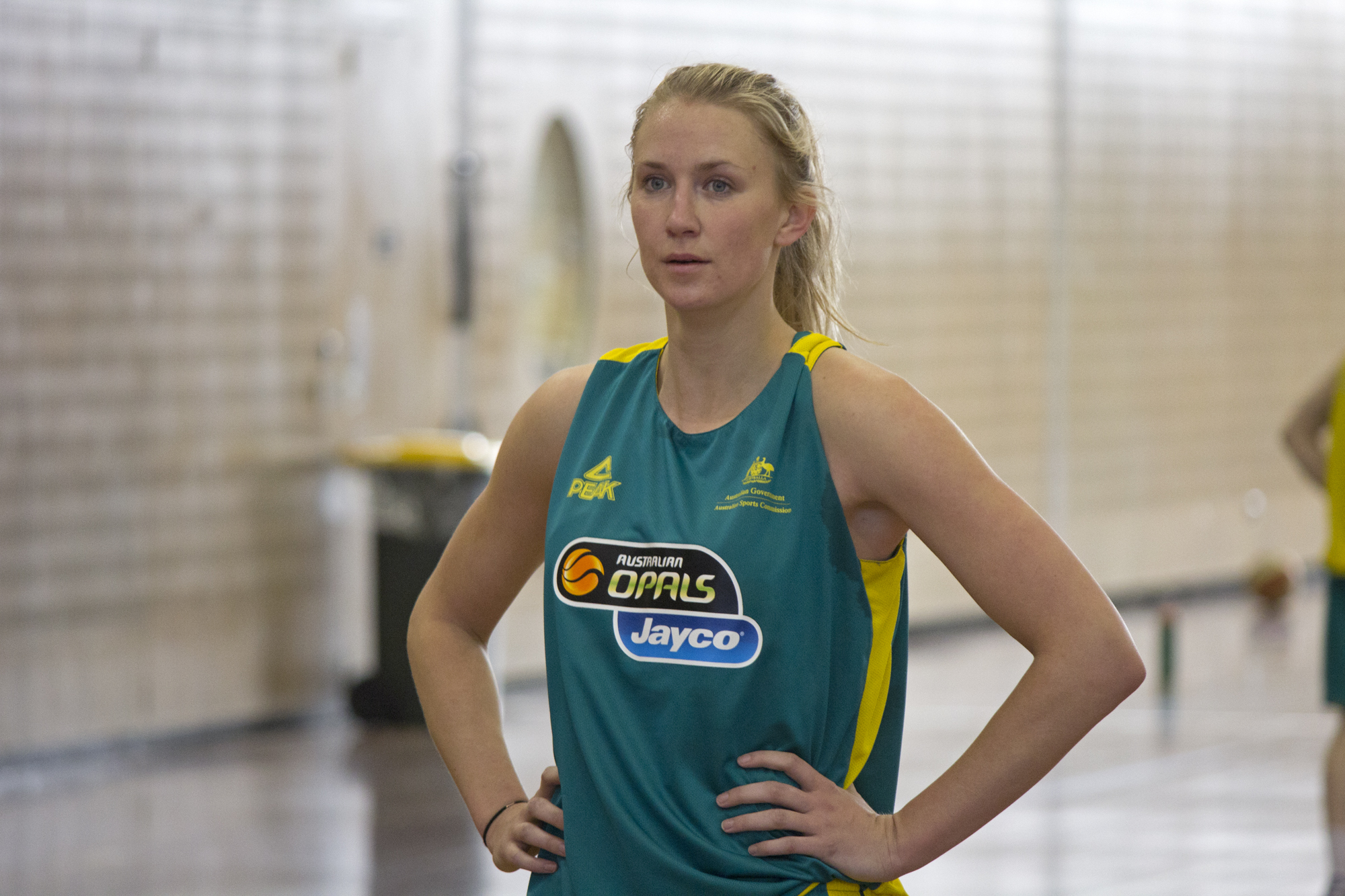

Personal information
- Born: 21 August 1985 (age 41) Fitzroy, Victoria
- Listed height: 6 ft 0 in (1.83 m)

Career information
- College: Wyoming (2004–2008)
- WNBA draft: 2008: undrafted
- Playing career: 2002–2015
- Position: Guard / forward

Career history
- 2002–2004: Australian Institute of Sport
- 2008–2009: Bendigo Spirit
- 2009–2011: Bulleen Boomers
- 2011–2013: UNIQA Sopron
- 2013–2014: Logan Thunder
- 2014–2015: Canberra Capitals

Hanna Elizabeth Zavecz (born 21 August 1985) is an Australian basketball player who has played for the Australian Institute of Sport (AIS), Bendigo Spirit and Bulleen Boomers in the WNBL. She has also played university basketball in the United States for the University of Wyoming. She earned her first call up to the Australia women's national basketball team in 2010 and participated in the national team's 2012 Summer Olympics qualifying campaign.

== Personal ==
Hanna Elizabeth Zavecz was born on 21 August 1985 and is from Melbourne, Victoria. Her parents are Peter and Marianne and she has two older brothers. Zavecz is 183 centimetres (72 in) tall. Zavecz attended the University of Wyoming from 2004 to 2008, where she majored in human nutrition and food. One of her biggest challenges moving from Melbourne to Wyoming in to attend university was the cold winter weather.

== Basketball ==
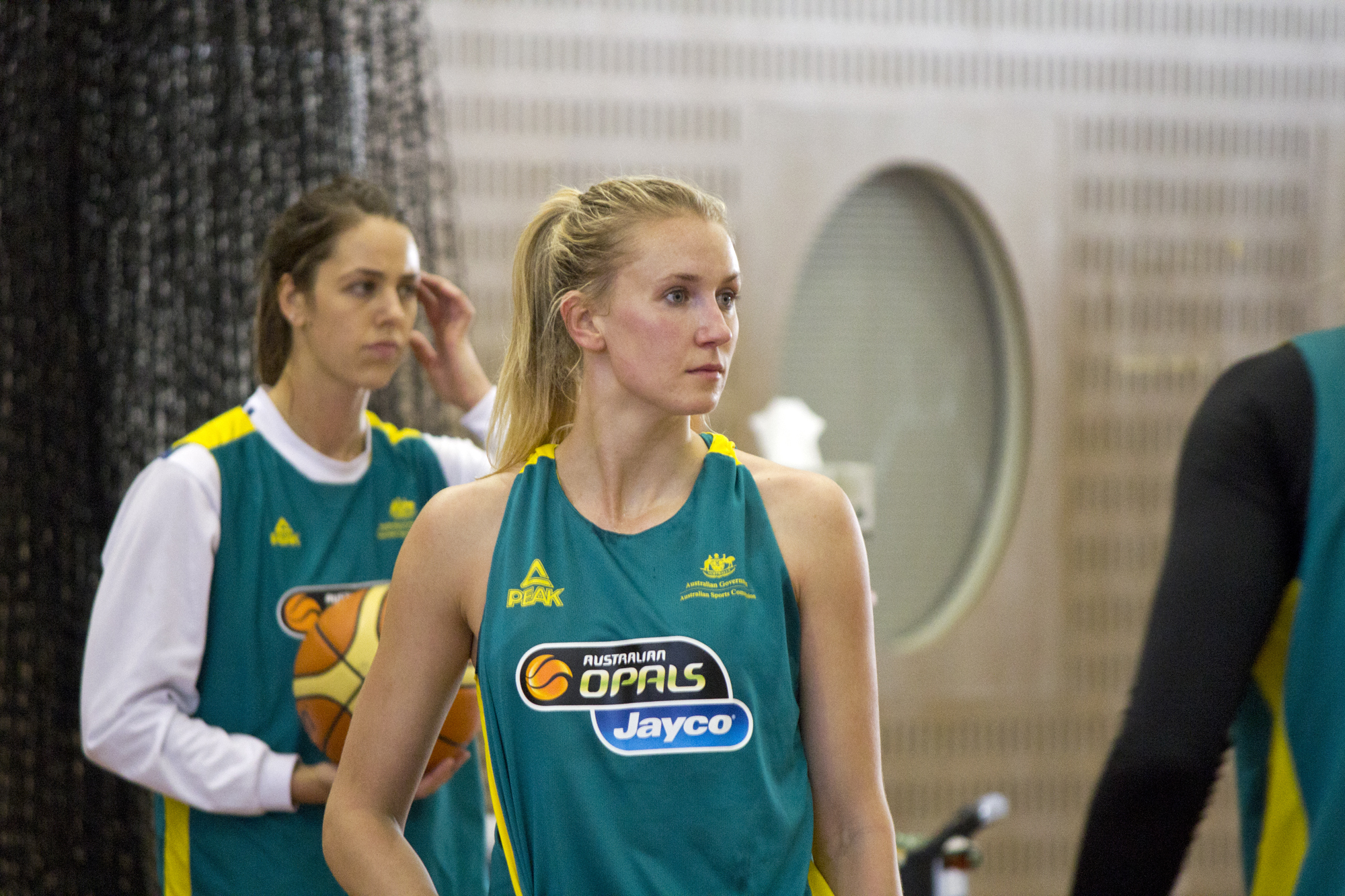
Jenna O'Hea and Hanna Zavecz at the Opals camp held at the Australian Institute of Sport.

Zavecz plays as a guard and forward, and is considered a "tall".

Zavecz played representative basketball for Country Victoria at the under-16 and under-18 levels at the national championships. In 2001, she was the captain of her side on the under-16 level. She represented Victoria in the Australian national under-20 championships in 2003, where her team took home gold. Prior to going to the United States, she played for Bulleen in the Victorian Basketball League where she was coached by Raquel Conel.

=== University ===
Zavecz considered several United States universities including Idaho State, Georgia Tech and Memphis before choosing the University of Wyoming, where was played forward from 2004 to 2008. Her university coach had never seen her play before she came to play for the team. Zavecz's club coach convinced him to offer her a scholarship.

In Zavecz's first Conference game as a freshman, playing BYU University, she scored 32 points and had 7 blocks setting two Freshman records for the conference. In her first year, she was a Second Team All-Mountain West Conference (MWC) selection. In her second season with the team, they won 21 games. Nationally, they were ranked 18th. In her third season with the team, they were 16–1 to start the season. She was named by the Associated Press as an Honorable Mention All-American in 2008. Over the course of her career there, she averaged 14 points per game, 6.1 rebounds per game, 3.6 assists per game, 48 total blocked shots and 47 total steals. She was a three-time First-Team All-MWC player and two times Defensive Player of the Year for the Mountain West Conference.

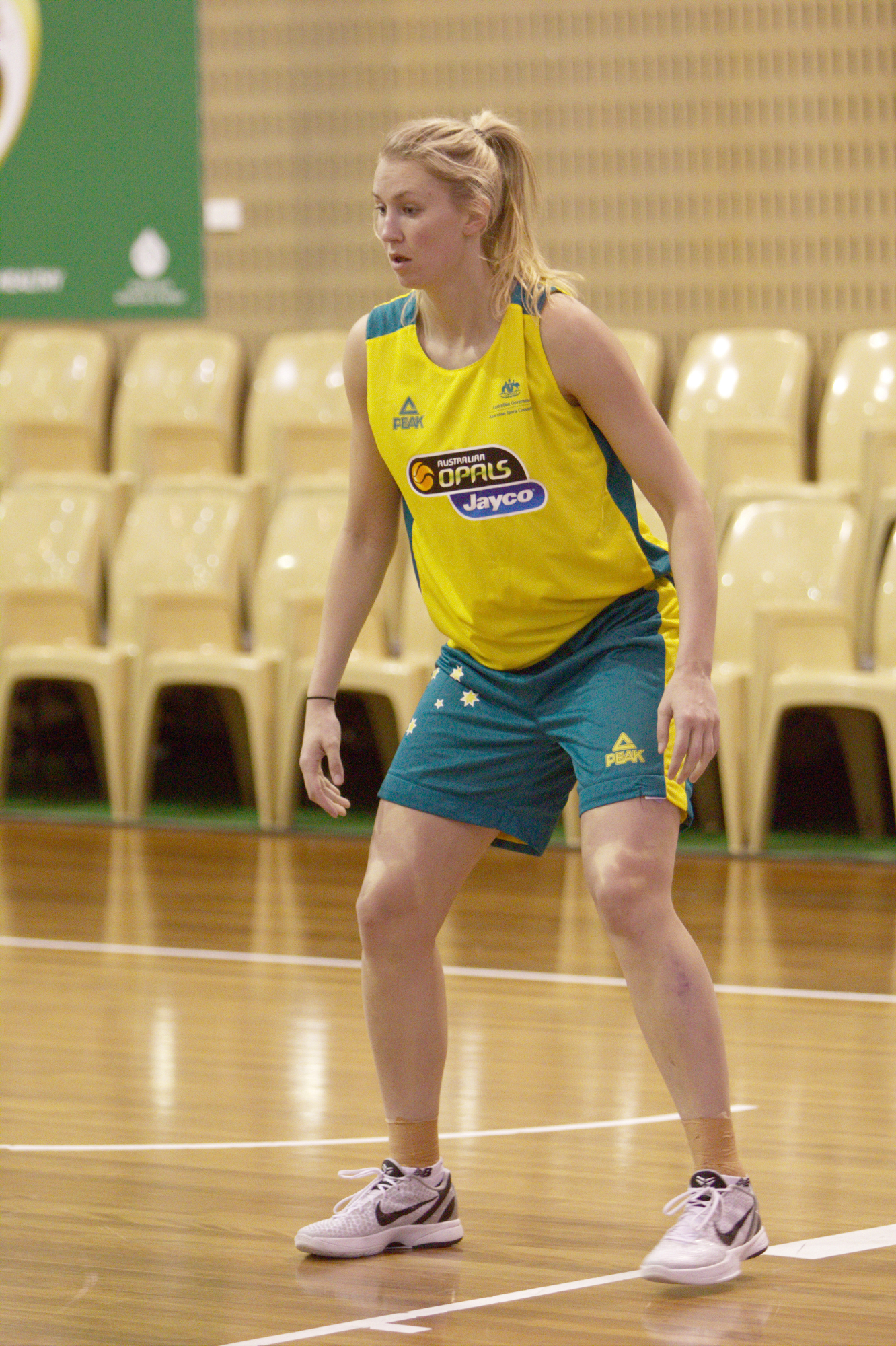
Zavec at Training Camp

Zavecz was one of seven international players to have played for Wyoming through the 2011–12 season.

=== Wyoming statistics ===
Ratios
Year	Team	GP	FG%	3P%	FT%	RBG	APG	BPG	SPG	PPG
2004-05	Wyoming	28	41.1%	32.0%	69.1%	6.43	2.46	0.86	1.71	14.25
2005-06	Wyoming	30	38.6%	33.8%	72.5%	6.67	3.90	1.27	2.30	14.43
2006-07	Wyoming	35	42.8%	40.5%	75.0%	5.14	3.83	1.40	1.69	13.94
2007-08	Wyoming	31	40.5%	23.7%	64.9%	6.03	3.61	1.65	1.61	13.74
Career		124	40.7%	33.0%	70.4%	6.02	3.48	1.31	1.82	14.08

Totals
Year	Team	GP	FG	FGA	3P	3PA	FT	FTA	REB	A	BK	ST	PTS
2004-05	Wyoming	28	141	343	32	100	85	123	180	69	24	48	399
2005-06	Wyoming	30	135	350	47	139	116	160	200	117	38	69	433
2006-07	Wyoming	35	148	346	45	111	147	196	180	134	49	59	488
2007-08	Wyoming	31	140	346	22	93	124	191	187	112	51	50	426
Career		124	564	1385	146	443	472	670	747	432	162	226	1746

=== Europe ===
Zavecz played for the Uniqa Euroleasing Sopron, Hungary in 2012. In the season, she played 11 games, averaging 8.2 points per game and 4.5 rebounds per game.

=== WNBL ===
Zavecz has played in Australia's WNBL. In 2002 and 2003, she had a scholarship with the Australian Institute of Sport and played for the AIS WNBL team. While at the AIS, they ingrained in her the need to eat healthy. While on road trips with the WNBL AIS team, they were never allowed to eat fast food. She signed with the Bendigo Spirit in 2008. She played for the Bendigo Spirit in the 2008/2009 season in the forward position. Going into the 17th round, she was averaging 6.2 points and 4.6 rebounds per game. She missed six games in the first sixteen rounds because she was injury, most of them before the WNBL Christmas break. She played for the Bulleen Boomers in 2010/2011, her first year with the team. Early in the season, she missed the first two games which were Bulleen losses.

=== National team ===
Zavecz earned her first call up to the Australia women's national basketball team in 2010 and participated in a tour of China, USA and Hungary in mid-2010. In late July 2011, she played in a three-game test series against China played in Queensland. In the first game against China, Australia won 73–67 with Zavec contributing in key moments in the fourth quarter. She played in the 2012 Summer Olympic qualifying game against the New Zealand women's national basketball team. She was named to the 2012 Australia women's national basketball team.
