= Chinese Taipei women's national 3x3 team =

National 3x3 basketball team

Chinese Taipei
- FIBA zone: FIBA Asia

World Cup
- Appearances: 2

Asian Cup
- Appearances: 7

The Chinese Taipei women's national 3x3 team is a national basketball team of Chinese Taipei (Taiwan), administered by the Chinese Taipei Basketball Association. It represents the country in international 3x3 (3 against 3) women's basketball competitions.

== Tournament records ==
=== World Cup ===
Year	Position	Pld	W	L
(Greece) 2012 Athens	7th	7	4	3
(China) 2016 Guangzhou	15th	4	1	3
Total	2/2	11	5	6

=== Asian Games ===
Year	Pos	Pld	W	L
(Indonesia) 2018 Jakarta	4th	5	3	2
(China) 2022 Hangzhou	4th	6	4	2
(Japan) 2026 Aichi-Nagoya	5th	5	3	2

=== 3x3 Asia Cup ===
- 2017 – 9th
- 2018 – 8th
- 2022 – 5th
- 2023 – 8th
- 2024 – 4th
- 2025 – 9th
- 2026 – 9th

== See also ==
- Chinese Taipei men's national 3x3 team
- Chinese Taipei women's national basketball team
