= Japan women's national 3x3 team =

National 3x3 basketball team

Japan
- FIBA ranking: 10
- FIBA zone: FIBA Asia
- Coach: Torsten Loibl

Olympic Games
- Appearances: 1

World Cup
- Appearances: 7

Asia Cup
- Appearances: 3
- Medals: (2019)
Home	Away

The Japan women's national 3x3 team is a national 3x3 basketball team of Japan, administered by the Japan Basketball Association.

It represents the country in international 3x3 (3 against 3) women's basketball competitions.

As of late 2019, the head coach was Torsten Loibl.

== Tournament record ==
=== Olympic Games ===
Year	Position	Pld	W	L	Players
(Japan) 2020 Tokyo	5th	8	5	3	Mawuli, Nishioka, Shinozaki, Yamamoto
(France) 2024 Paris	Did not qualify				
Total	1/2	8	5	3	

=== World Cup ===
Year	Position	Pld	W	L	Players
2016 China	19th	4	0	4	Higano, Kawahara, Mori, Yoshitake
2017 France	13th	4	1	3	Tachikawa, Hanada, Iizuka, Yano
2019 Netherlands	13th	4	1	3	Iju, Miyashita, Mawuli, Kuribayashi
2022 Belgium	13th	4	2	2	Mawuli, Nagata, Nakada, Yamamoto
(Austria) 2023 Vienna	9th	5	3	2	Emura, Nakada, Santa, Takada
(Mongolia) 2025 Ulaanbaatar	9th	5	3	2	Katsura, Miyashita, F. Takahashi, M. Takahashi
(Poland) 2026 Warsaw	15th	4	1	3	Katsura, Miyashita, Takahashi, Tsurumi
2027 Singapore	To be determined				
Total	7/11	40	11	19	

=== Asia Cup ===
- 2018 – 4th
- 2019 – 3rd
- 2022 – 4th
- 2023 – 5th
- 2024 – 5th
- 2025 – 2nd
- 2026 – 4th

=== Asian Games ===
Year	Pos	Pld	W	L	Players
(Indonesia) 2018	2nd	6	5	1	Mawuli, Miyashita, Okuyama, Konno
(China) 2022	3rd	7	5	2	
(Japan) 2026	1st	7	5	2	

== See also ==
- Sport in Japan
  - Basketball in Japan
- Japan women's national under-23 3x3 team
- Japan women's national basketball team
- Japan men's national 3x3 team
