= Hong Kong women's national 3x3 team =

Basketball team for Hong Kong

Hong Kong
- FIBA zone: FIBA Asia
- National federation: Basketball Association of Hong Kong, China

3x3 World Cup
- Appearances: None

3x3 Asia Cup
- Appearances: 1 (2013)
- Medals: None

The Hong Kong women's 3x3 team is representative 3x3 basketball team of Hong Kong, governed by the Basketball Association of Hong Kong, China. It represents the region in international 3x3 (3 against 3) women's basketball competitions.

== See also ==
- Hong Kong men's national 3x3 team
- Hong Kong women's national basketball team
