= China women's national 3x3 team =

National 3x3 basketball team

China
- FIBA ranking: 23
- FIBA zone: FIBA Asia

Olympic Games
- Appearances: 2
- Medals: (bronze) Bronze (2020)

World Cup
- Appearances: 9
- Medals: Gold (2019); Bronze (2022)

Asian Cup
- Appearances: 8
- Medals: (gold) Gold: (2022); (silver) Silver: (2018); (bronze) Bronze: (2017, 2025, 2026)
Medal record
Women's 3x3 basketball
Representing China
Olympic Games
| Bronze medal – third place | 2020 Tokyo | Team |
FIBA 3x3 World Cup
| Gold medal – first place | 2019 Amsterdam | Team |
| Bronze medal – third place | 2022 Antwerp | Team |

The China women's national 3x3 team is a national 3x3 basketball team of China, governed by the Basketball Association of the People's Republic of China. It represents the country in international 3x3 (3 against 3) women's basketball competitions.

== Tournament record ==
=== Summer Olympics ===
| Year | Position | Pld | W | L |
|---|---|---|---|---|
| (Japan) 2020 Tokyo | 3rd | 10 | 7 | 3 |
| (France) 2024 Paris | 6th | 8 | 2 | 6 |
| Total | 2/2 | 18 | 9 | 9 |

=== 3x3 World Cup ===
| Year | Position | Pld | W | L |
|---|---|---|---|---|
| (Greece) 2012 Athens | Did not qualify | | | |
| (Russia) 2014 Moscow | 11th | 6 | 3 | 3 |
| (China) 2016 Guangzhou | 10th | 4 | 3 | 1 |
| (France) 2017 Nantes | 17th | 4 | 0 | 4 |
| (Philippines) 2018 Bocaue | 4th | 7 | 5 | 2 |
| (Netherlands) 2019 Amsterdam | 1st | 7 | 7 | 0 |
| (Belgium) 2022 Antwerp | 3rd | 7 | 5 | 2 |
| (Austria) 2023 Vienna | 4th | 7 | 5 | 2 |
| (Mongolia) 2025 Ulaanbaatar | 10th | 5 | 2 | 3 |
| (Poland) 2026 Warsaw | 10th | 5 | 2 | 3 |
| Total | 9/10 | 52 | 32 | 20 |

=== 3x3 Asia Cup ===
- 2017 – 3rd
- 2018 – 2nd
- 2019 – 10th
- 2022 – 1st
- 2023 – 3rd
- 2024 – 7th
- 2025 – 3rd
- 2026 – 3rd

=== Champions Cup ===
| Year | Position | Pld | W | L |
|---|---|---|---|---|
| (Thailand) 2025 Bangkok | 6th | 3 | 1 | 2 |
| (Thailand) 2026 Bangkok | did not qualify | | | |
| Total | 1/1 | 3 | 1 | 2 |

== See also ==
- China men's national 3x3 team
- China women's national basketball team
