= Kazakhstan women's national 3x3 team =

Women's national basketball team

Kazakhstan
- FIBA zone: FIBA Asia

FIBA 3x3 World Championships
- Appearances: 2

Asian Cup
- Appearances: 4

The Kazakhstan women's national 3x3 team is a national basketball team of Kazakhstan, administered by the Kazakhstan Basketball Federation. It represents the country in international 3x3 (3 against 3) women's basketball competitions.

== Tournament record ==
=== World Cup ===
Year	Position	Pld	W	L
(Greece) 2012 Athens	Did not qualify			
(Russia) 2014 Moscow	Did not qualify			
(China) 2016 Guangzhou	Did not qualify			
(France) 2017 Nantes	16th	4	1	3
(Philippines) 2018 Bocaue	18th	4	0	4
(Netherlands) 2019 Amsterdam	Did not qualify			
(Belgium) 2022 Antwerp	Did not qualify			
(Austria) 2023 Vienna	Did not qualify			
(Mongolia) 2025 Ulaanbaatar	Did not qualify			
(Poland) 2026 Warsaw	To be determined			
2027 Singapore	To be determined			
Total	2/11	8	1	7

=== 3x3 Asia Cup ===
- 2017 – 10th
- 2018 – 5th
- 2019 – 2nd
- 2026 – 10th

== See also ==
- Kazakhstan men's national 3x3 team
- Kazakhstan women's national basketball team
