= Bangladesh men's national 3x3 team =

National 3x3 basketball team

Bangladesh
- FIBA zone: FIBA Asia
- National federation: Bangladesh Basketball Federation
- Coach: Ifterkhar Islam Hira

Olympic Games
- Appearances: No Appearances

World Cup
- Appearances: No Appearances

Asian Cup
- Appearances: No Appearances
Home	Away

The Bangladesh men's national 3x3 team represents Bangladesh in international 3x3 (3 against 3) basketball competitions. It is governed by the Bangladesh Basketball Federation (BBF). It represents the country in international 3x3 (3 against 3) basketball competitions.

== History ==
The Bangladesh men's national 3x3 team have not yet participated any 3x3 basketball tournament. The Bangladesh Basketball Federation aiming to participate upcoming FIBA 3x3 Asia Cup tournament.

== Competitions records ==
=== Olympic Games ===
Basketball at the Summer Olympics records
Host	Result	Position	Played	Won	Lost	Players
(Japan) 2020	Did not qualify					
(France) 2024	Did not qualify					
Total	0/2	0 Title	0	0	0	—

=== FIBA 3x3 World Cup ===
FIBA 3x3 World Cup records
Host	Result	Position	Played	Won	Lost	Players
(Greece) 2012	Did not qualify					
(Russia) 2014	Did not qualify					
(China) 2016	Did not qualify					
(France) 2017	Did not qualify					
(Philippines) 2018	Did not qualify					
(Netherlands) 2019	Did not qualify					
(Belgium) 2022	Did not qualify					
(Austria) 2023	Did not qualify					
(Mongolia) 2025	Did not qualify					
(Poland) 2026	To be determined					
Total	0/9	0 Title	0	0	0	—

=== FIBA Asia Cup ===
FIBA 3x3 Asia Cup records
Host	Result	Position	Played	Won	Lost	Players
(Qatar) 2013	Did not participate					
(Mongolia) 2017	Did not participate					
(China) 2018	Did not participate					
(China) 2019	Did not participate					
(Singapore) 2022	Did not participate					
(Singapore) 2023	Did not participate					
(Singapore) 2024	Did not participate					
(Singapore) 2025	Did not participate					
Total	0/8	0 Title	0	0	0	—

=== Commonwealth Games ===
Basketball at the Commonwealth Games records
Host	Result	Position	Played	Won	Lost	Players
(England) 2022	Did not participate					
Total	0/1	0 Title	0	0	0	—
