= 3x3 basketball at the 2026 Commonwealth Games – Men's tournament =

Men's 3x3 basketball tournament at the 2026 Commonwealth Games
- Venue: SEC Armadillo, Glasgow
- Dates: 24 – 28 July 2026
- Competitors: 48 from 12 nations

Medalists
gold medal	Jamell Anderson; Ashley Hamilton; Dwayne Lautier-Ogunleye; Evan Walshe	England
silver medal	Jonah Antonio; Jarred Bairstow; Samuel McDaniel; Jesse Wagstaff	Australia
bronze medal	Kyle Jimenez; Fraser Malcolm; Owen McCormack; Skyler White	Scotland

The men's 3x3 basketball tournament at the 2026 Commonwealth Games will be held in SEC Centre in Glasgow between 24 - 28 July 2026. England won the gold medal, defeating Australia in the final. Scotland won the bronze medal.

== Qualification ==
Scotland qualified as host nation and the other nations qualified by FIBA 3x3 Federation Ranking. Special arrangements were in place to ascertain the recipient of the quota place earned by Great Britain.

Means of qualification	Quotas	Qualified
Host Nation	1	Scotland
2025 Pacific Mini Games	1	Fiji
FIBA 3x3 Federation Rankings (Regional Qualification)	4	Kenya; Singapore; Cayman Islands; Australia
FIBA 3x3 Federation Rankings (Open Qualification)	5	New Zealand; Nigeria; Jamaica; Malaysia; Guyana
Home Nations Qualifier	1	England
TOTAL	12	

== Rosters ==
CGA	Players			
Australia	Jonah Antonio	Jarred Bairstow	Samuel McDaniel	Jesse Wagstaff
Cayman Islands	Brad Lansdell	Brian Ebanks-Perez	Alwin Buttrum Jr.	Nathaniel Hurlston-Anderson
Fiji	Joshua Fox	Filimone Waqabaca	Keenan Hughes	Issac Sewabu
England	Jamell Anderson	Ashley Hamilton	Dwayne Lautier-Ogunleye	Evan Walshe
Guyana	Anish Ramlall	Travis Belgrave	Christian Hinckson	Kevin Mickle
Jamaica	Malik Lawrence-Anderson	Nicholai Brown	Tommy McDonald	Lushane Wilson
Kenya	Denis Aduol	David Gichohi	Brans Nzioka	Rodney Olang
Malaysia	Zi Fueng Chang	Zhen Yang Chong	Xian Fu Ooi	Chun Hong Ting
New Zealand	Josh Book	Daniel Dobson	Christian Martin	Campbell Scott
Nigeria	Marcel Esonwune	Ike Nwamu	Esosa Okundaye	Robert Ukawuba
Scotland	Kyle Jimenez	Fraser Malcolm	Owen McCormack	Skyler White
Singapore	Ching Zhen Yu	Faizal Mohamed Zahid Mohamed	Aufa Bin Emil Putra Nur	Xu Duanyang

== Competition format ==
Twelve teams are drawn into two groups, each of which plays a complete round-robin. Upon completion of the group stage, the top-ranked teams in each group advances to the directly to the semi-finals; the second and third placed placed teams in each group progress to the semi-final 'play-ins'.

== Group stage ==
All times based on British Summer Time (UTC+01:00)

=== Group A ===
Pos	Team	Pld	W	L	PF	PA	PD	Qualification
1	Australia	5	5	0	105	60	+45	Direct to semi-finals
2	New Zealand	5	4	1	99	56	+43	Quarter-finals
3	Scotland (H)	5	3	2	90	85	+5	Quarter-finals
4	Nigeria	5	2	3	82	99	−17	
5	Guyana	5	1	4	68	100	−32	
6	Cayman Islands	5	0	5	61	105	−44	

Source: Glasgow 2026
Rules for classification: 1) Wins; 2) Head-to-head record; 3) Points scored.
(H) Hosts

24 July 2026
10:00

Report

New Zealand	15–21	Australia
Pts: Book 6		Pts: Antonio, McDaniel 8

SEC, Glasgow

24 July 2026
10:50

Report

Nigeria	21–17	Cayman Islands
Pts: Nwamu, Okundaye 6		Pts: Lansdell 11

SEC, Glasgow

24 July 2026
12:30

Report

Scotland	21–14	Guyana
Pts: White 8		Pts: Hinckson 6

SEC, Glasgow

24 July 2026
14:55

Report

New Zealand	21–3	Guyana
Pts: Book 10		Pts: Hinckson 2

SEC, Glasgow

24 July 2026
15:45

Report

Scotland	22–13	Cayman Islands
Pts: White 15		Pts: Lansdell 7

SEC, Glasgow

24 July 2026
17:25

Report

Australia	21–15	Nigeria
Pts: Antonio 12		Pts: Nwamu 9

SEC, Glasgow

24 July 2026
19:00

Report

New Zealand	21–10	Nigeria
Pts: Lewis 8		Pts: Ukawuba, Okundaye 3

SEC, Glasgow

24 July 2026
19:50

Report

Cayman Islands	17–21	Guyana
Pts: Hurlston-Anderson 11		Pts: Ramlall 9

SEC, Glasgow

24 July 2026
20:40

Report

Scotland	14–21	Australia
Pts: White 7		Pts: McDaniel 10

SEC, Glasgow

26 July 2026
11:30

Report

New Zealand	21–9	Cayman Islands
Pts: Book 11		Pts: Hurlston-Anderson 7

SEC, Glasgow

26 July 2026
13:10

Report

Scotland	21–16	Nigeria
Pts: McCormack 8		Pts: Esonwune 7

SEC, Glasgow

26 July 2026
14:50

Report

Australia	21–11	Guyana
Pts: Antonio 8		Pts: Hinckson 5

SEC, Glasgow

26 July 2026
17:00

Report

New Zealand	21–13	Scotland
Pts: Book 9		Pts: Jimenez 8

SEC, Glasgow

26 July 2026
18:40

Report

Nigeria	20–19	Guyana
Pts: Okundayo 9		Pts: Ramlall 10

SEC, Glasgow

26 July 2026
20:20

Report

Australia	21–5	Cayman Islands
Pts: McDaniel 12		Pts: Hurlston-Anderson, Ebanks-Perez 2

SEC, Glasgow

=== Group B ===
Pos	Team	Pld	W	L	PF	PA	PD	Qualification
1	England	5	5	0	105	70	+35	Direct to semi-finals
2	Malaysia	5	4	1	103	82	+21	Quarter-finals
3	Singapore	5	2	3	88	86	+2	Quarter-finals
4	Kenya	5	2	3	82	82	0	
5	Fiji	5	1	4	66	97	−31	
6	Jamaica	5	1	4	77	104	−27	

Source: Glasgow 2026
Rules for classification: 1) Wins; 2) Head-to-head record; 3) Points scored.

25 July 2026
10:00

Report

Singapore	19–16	Kenya
Pts: Nur 7		Pts: Olang 8

SEC, Glasgow

25 July 2026
10:50

Report

Malaysia	21–16	Fiji
Pts: Ting 7		Pts: Sewabu 7

SEC, Glasgow

25 July 2026
12:30

Report

England	22–16	Jamaica
Pts: Walshe 9		Pts: McDonald 7

SEC, Glasgow

25 July 2026
14:55

Report

Singapore	20–22	Jamaica
Pts: Mohamed 10		Pts: Brown 8

SEC, Glasgow

25 July 2026
15:45

Report

England	21–13	Fiji
Pts: Lautier-Ogunleye 13		Pts: Waqabaca 5

SEC, Glasgow

25 July 2026
17:25

Report

Kenya	15–21	Malaysia
Pts: Gichohi 7		Pts: Ting 10

SEC, Glasgow

25 July 2026
19:00

Report

Singapore	15–21	Malaysia
Pts: Ching 7		Pts: Ting 9

SEC, Glasgow

25 July 2026
19:50

Report

England	21–9	Kenya
Pts: Lautier-Ogunleye 8		Pts: Gichohi 5

SEC, Glasgow

25 July 2026
20:40

Report

Fiji	21–15	Jamaica
Pts: Waqabaca 10		Pts: McDonald 6

SEC, Glasgow

27 July 2026
11:55

Report

Singapore	21–7	Fiji
Pts: Ching 10		Pts: Sewabu 3

SEC, Glasgow

27 July 2026
13:35

Report

England	21–19	Malaysia
Pts: Lautier-Ogunleye 8		Pts: Chong, Ting 6

SEC, Glasgow

27 July 2026
15:15

Report

Kenya	22–12	Jamaica
Pts: Gichohi 11		Pts: Lawrence Anderson 6

SEC, Glasgow

27 July 2026
17:25

Report

Singapore	13–21	England
Pts: Nur 5		Pts: Walshe 8

SEC, Glasgow

27 July 2026
19:05

Report

Kenya	22–9	Fiji
Pts: Gichohi 14		Pts: Sewabu 4

SEC, Glasgow

27 July 2026
20:45

Report

Malaysia	21–15	Jamaica
Pts: Chang 11		Pts: Lawrence Anderson 6

SEC, Glasgow

== Knockout stage ==
Play-ins
28 July
New Zealand	21
Singapore	15
28 July
Malaysia	16
Scotland	21

Semi-finals
29 July
England	21
New Zealand	16
29 July
Australia	21
Scotland	14

Gold medal match
29 July
England	19
Australia	17
Bronze medal match
29 July
New Zealand	16
Scotland	18

=== Play-ins ===
28 July 2026
17:30

Report

New Zealand	21–15	Singapore
Pts: Tonge 7		Pts: Xu 6

SEC, Glasgow

28 July 2026
18:00

Report

Malaysia	16–21	Scotland
Pts: Ting 9		Pts: Jimenez 7

SEC, Glasgow

=== Semi-finals ===
29 July 2026
11:30

Report

Australia	21–14	Scotland
Pts: McDaniel 10		Pts: Jimenez 8

SEC, Glasgow

29 July 2026
12:00

Report

England	21–16	New Zealand
Pts: Hamilton 8		Pts: Martin 8

SEC, Glasgow

=== Bronze medal match ===
29 July 2026
16:30

Report

New Zealand	16–18	Scotland
Pts: Book 5		Pts: Jimenez 9

SEC, Glasgow

=== Gold medal match ===
29 July 2026
19:30

Report

England	19–17	Australia
Pts: Lautier-Ogunleye 7		Pts: Antonio 12

SEC, Glasgow

== Final ranking ==
Rank	Team
1st place, gold medalist(s)	England
2nd place, silver medalist(s)	Australia
3rd place, bronze medalist(s)	Scotland
4	New Zealand
5	Malaysia
6	Singapore
7	Kenya
7	Nigeria
9	Guyana
10	Fiji
11	Jamaica
12	Cayman Islands
