= Adam Forde =

Australian professional basketball coach (born 1982)

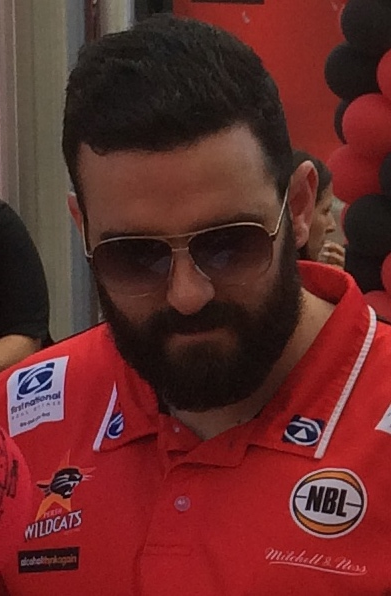
- Forde with the Perth Wildcats in 2017

Cairns Taipans
- Position: Head coach
- League: NBL

Personal information
- Born: 11 January 1982 (age 44)

Career information
- Playing career: 2003–2003
- Coaching career: 2010–present

Career history

Playing
- 2003: Norths Bears

Coaching
- 2010: Rockingham Flames
- 2011: East Perth Eagles (assistant)
- 2011–2012: West Coast Waves (assistant)
- 2012–2015: East Perth Eagles
- 2013–2019: Perth Wildcats (assistant)
- 2019: East Perth Eagles
- 2019–2020: Sydney Kings (assistant)
- 2020–2021: Sydney Kings
- 2021: Hawke's Bay Hawks
- 2021–present: Cairns Taipans

Career highlights
- As head coach: NBL Coach of the Year (2023); SBL champion (2014); As assistant coach: 4× NBL champion (2014, 2016, 2017, 2019)
Medals
Men's 3x3 basketball
Representing Australia
Asia Cup
Gold medal – first place	2025 Singapore	Team
Champions Cup
Bronze medal – third place	2025 Thailand	Team
Commonwealth Games
Silver medal – second place	2026 Glasgow	3x3 Competition

Adam Forde (born 11 January 1982) is an Australian professional basketball coach who is the head coach of the Cairns Taipans of the National Basketball League (NBL). He is also head coach of the Australia Men's 3x3 Gangurrus. Between 2013 and 2019, Forde was an assistant coach with the Perth Wildcats of the NBL and won four NBL championships. After a season as an assistant coach with the Sydney Kings in 2019–20, he served as their head coach during the 2020–21 season. He was appointed head coach of the Cairns Taipans in 2021, and in 2023 he was named the NBL Coach of the Year.

Forde has also coached in the State Basketball League (SBL), most notably guiding the East Perth Eagles men's team to their maiden championship in 2014. He also spent a season as a West Coast Waves assistant in the WNBL and briefly coached the Hawke's Bay Hawks of the New Zealand NBL in 2021.

== Early life ==
Originally from Perth, Western Australia, Forde attended college at Jamestown Community College in New York between 2001 and 2003. In 2003, he played semi-professionally in the Waratah League for the Norths Bears.

== Coaching career ==
=== NBL ===
Forde arrived at the Perth Wildcats in 2011 as an unpaid video tech but was continually promoted during his eight-year tenure. After a stint as a development coach, Forde was appointed the Wildcats' technical assistant on 1 August 2013. He became a full-time assistant in 2015. Under head coach Trevor Gleeson, Forde won four NBL championships in 2014, 2016, 2017 and 2019.

In May 2019, Forde was appointed assistant coach of the Sydney Kings. He helped head coach Will Weaver guide the Kings in 2019–20 to the minor premiership and their first NBL Grand Final appearance since 2008. Sydney were defeated 2–1 in a COVID-impacted grand final series against Perth.

On 4 December 2020, following Weaver's departure, Forde was appointed head coach of the Kings for the 2020–21 NBL season. In his first season as an NBL head coach, he guided the Kings to a fifth-place finish in another COVID-impacted season with a 19–17 record, just missing a top 4 finals berth on points percentage. He parted ways with the Kings following the season.

On 29 June 2021, Forde was appointed head coach of the Cairns Taipans on a two-year deal. In 2022–23, Forde guided the Taipans to their second best regular season record in franchise history and was awarded NBL Coach of the Year. They would later lose in the semi-final to eventual champions Sydney Kings in the final deciding 3 game series. He then spent time with the San Antonio Spurs during the 2023 NBA Summer League.

On 3 March 2023, Forde re-signed with the Taipans on a two-year deal.

After a second consecutive season of failing to make playoffs and with only 8 wins from 29 games, Forde initially parted ways following the conclusion of the 2024–25 NBL season. He later re-signed to remain as head coach on 13 June 2025 until the foreseeable future. He then spent time with the Utah Jazz during the Salt Lake City Summer League.

There was much optimism for the 2025–26 NBL season with the signing of Jack McVeigh, However, the Taipans again struggled with injuries rarely suiting up a fully fit squad. with Sam Waardenburg, Reyne Smith and Alex Higgins-Titsha all spending extended time sidelined. The Taipans subsequently finished the season with 9 wins and 24 loses.

On 31 May 2026, Forde signed a new two-year contract to continue as head coach of the Taipans.

=== SBL ===
In 2010, Forde served as head coach of the Rockingham Flames men's team in the State Basketball League (SBL). In 2011, he joined the East Perth Eagles and served as an assistant coach for both the men's and women's teams.

For the 2012 season, Forde was appointed head coach of the East Perth Eagles men's team. He helped guide the Eagles to the SBL Grand Final, where they were defeated 105–72 by the Cockburn Cougars. Following a semi-final defeat in 2013, the Eagles returned to the SBL Grand Final in 2014. Forde helped guide the Eagles to their maiden championship with a 99–83 win over the Geraldton Buccaneers. He stepped down as coach of the Eagles midway through the 2015 season.

Forde returned to coach the Eagles in 2019.

=== WNBL ===
For the 2011–12 WNBL season, Forde served as an assistant coach with the West Coast Waves.

=== New Zealand NBL ===
In July 2020, Forde was appointed head coach of the Hawke's Bay Hawks of the New Zealand National Basketball League (NZNBL) for the 2021 season. However, after Forde took on the Sydney Kings head coach role, Jacob Chance was appointed Hawke's Bay coach to cover for Forde. The pair later split the role, with Forde ultimately finishing the season as Hawks head coach. The team recorded 12 wins and finished second on the ladder before defeating the Southland Sharks in the semi-final and losing to the Wellington Saints in the final.

=== World University Games ===
In 2019, Forde served as the lead assistant coach under Rob Beveridge with the Australian Emerging Boomers, helping the team win bronze at the World University Games in Naples, Italy.

=== National 3x3 team ===
On 10 March 2025, Forde was appointed head coach of the Australia Men's 3x3 Gangurrus. He helped the team win gold at the 3x3 Asia Cup and bronze at the inaugural 3x3 Champions Cup. He continued as head coach for the 2025 FIBA 3x3 World Cup in Mongolia.

Forde continued as head coach of the Men's 3x3 Gangurrus in 2026, guiding them at the 2026 FIBA 3x3 World Cup, where they did not qualify for the finals, and at the 2026 Commonwealth Games, where the team won the silver medal.

== Coaching profile ==
Forde’s coaching identity as a "players' coach" and reputation have primarily revolved around his history in talent identification and player development. It can be found reported as far back as 2012 that Forde prioritised youth development. With the Taipans being the lowest spending club in the NBL, and in some cases 45% less than the larger city clubs, 'The Factory' moniker was adopted by Forde and the Taipans due to their focus on recruiting and upskilling rookies and undervalued players. Most notably was back-to-back NBL Most Improved Player Award winner Keanu Pinder in 2022 and 2023 – the first time this has been achieved in league history. Bobi Klintman and Taran Armstrong were signed to the NBA, while the discovery of Alex Higgins-Titsha led to his first NBL contract and a training camp call-up with the Golden State Warriors less than 12 months later.

It is perhaps best described by Australian sports broadcaster Peter Hooley who stated in an ESPN interview, "they are a small market team, that doesn't have the money to spend like some of the major city teams and it's his game style and culture that will have them be competitive regardless. I think of it as a 'Moneyball' situation for the Taipans, where Forde uses the budget he has to find a group of young players who are hungry to succeed or are desperate for a second chance. He's a true players coach and seems to have got the best out of most of his players in a short amount of time."

== Personal life ==
Forde and his wife, Kylie, have a son.
