= Dillon Stith =

American basketball player (born 1992)

No. 8 – Kilsyth Cobras
- Position: Power forward
- League: NBL1 South

Personal information
- Born: February 20, 1992 (age 34)
- Listed height: 6 ft 7 in (2.01 m)
- Listed weight: 215 lb (98 kg)

Career information
- High school: Liberty (Bealeton, Virginia)
- College: Saint Vincent (2010–2014)
- NBA draft: 2014: undrafted
- Playing career: 2015–present

Career history
- 2015: Melbourne Tigers
- 2016–2019: McKinnon Cougars
- 2016–2017: Belfast Star
- 2019–2021: Melbourne United
- 2021–2022: Frankston Blues
- 2023: Waverley Falcons
- 2023–2024: BBC Arantia Larochette
- 2024: Casey Cavaliers
- 2024–2025: Cairns Taipans
- 2025–present: Kilsyth Cobras

Career highlights
- Big V champion (2019); 2× Big V MVP (2017, 2019); 4× Big V All-Star Five (2015, 2017–2019); Irish Super League All-Star Second Team (2017); Irish Super League scoring champion (2017); PAC Player of the Year (2014); First-team All-PAC (2014); Second-team All-PAC (2013); FIBA 3x3 Asia Cup MVP (2025)
Medals
Men's 3x3 basketball
Representing Australia
Asia Cup
Gold medal – first place	2025 Singapore	Team
Champions Cup
Bronze medal – third place	2025 Thailand	Team

John Charles Dillon Stith (born February 20, 1992) is an American-Australian professional basketball player for the Kilsyth Cobras of the NBL1 South. He played college basketball for Saint Vincent College before moving to Australia in 2015 to play in the Big V. After one season with the Melbourne Tigers, he played four seasons for the McKinnon Cougars between 2016 and 2019, winning Big V MVPs in 2017 and 2019 and leading the Cougars to the championship in 2019. He played two seasons with Melbourne United of the National Basketball League (NBL) between 2019 and 2021. He then played a season with the Cairns Taipans in 2024–25.

== Early life ==
Stith is a native of Bedford, Virginia. He attended Liberty High School in Bealeton, Virginia, where he was a two-time letterman and Senior Captain while earning First Team All-District and Second Team All-Area honors.

== College career ==
Stith played four seasons of college basketball for the Saint Vincent College Bearcats in the NCAA Division III between 2010 and 2014. As a freshman in 2010–11, he appeared in all 27 games and made one start while averaging 5.2 points and 3.7 rebounds per game. As a sophomore in 2011–12, he appeared in all 27 games with 13 starts and averaged 9.8 points and a team-leading 5.6 rebounds per game. He also blocked a team-high 35 shots. As a junior in 2012–13, he was named to All-PAC Second Team after averaging 11.7 points and 5.2 rebounds per game. He appeared in all 29 games with 14 starts. As a senior in 2013–14, he was named the PAC Player of the Year after being the only player in the conference to average a double-double with 19.5 points and 10.2 rebounds per game.

In 2024, Stith was inducted into the Saint Vincent College Athletics Hall of Fame.

== Professional career ==
Stith arrived in Australia with a touring team. After playing well in front of the Australian teams, he was offered a contract to play for the Melbourne Tigers in the Big V. He averaged 22.3 points and 10.2 rebounds per game in the 2015 season and earned Big V All-Star Five honors.

For the 2016 Big V season, Stith joined the McKinnon Cougars. He averaged 21.8 points and 7.1 rebounds per game.

In November 2016, Stith moved to Ireland to play for Belfast Star in the Super League. He was named Player of the Month for December. He left the team in February 2017. He was named to the league's All-Star Second Team for the 2016–17 season and was the league's scoring champion with 27.4 points per game.

Stith returned to the McKinnon Cougars for the 2017 season. He was named co-MVP of the Big V and earned All-Star Five honors.

In October 2017, Stith joined Melbourne United of the National Basketball League (NBL) for their trip to the United States to play an NBA preseason exhibition game against the Oklahoma City Thunder.

With the Cougars in 2018, Stith was again named to the All-Star Five while averaging 19.96 points per game.

In 2019, Stith led the Cougars to the Big V grand final series, where they defeated the Hume City Broncos 2–0 to win the championship. He had 37 points and 14 rebounds in the game two victory. He averaged 26.5 points and 11.2 rebounds for the season while earning league MVP honors and All-Star Five.

On October 2, 2019, Stith joined the roster of Melbourne United as an injury replacement for Casey Prather. He made his NBL debut the following day against the South East Melbourne Phoenix. He travelled to the United States with Melbourne later that month to play two NBA preseason games. As a result of an injury setback to Prather in both November and December, Stith remained in the line-up. In eight games during the 2019–20 NBL season, Stith averaged 2.0 points per game.

Stith had signed with the Knox Raiders of the NBL1 South for the 2020 NBL1 season, but the season was cancelled due to the COVID-19 pandemic.

In February 2021, Stith re-joined Melbourne United as an injury replacement. In seven games during the 2020–21 NBL season, he averaged 1.4 points per game.

Stith joined the Frankston Blues for the 2021 NBL1 South season. He scored double digits in all fifteen games for the Blues while averaging 22.1 points and 8.7 rebounds per game.

Stith re-joined the Frankston Blues for the 2022 NBL1 South season. In 24 games, he averaged 15.83 points, 6.83 rebounds, 1.54 assists and 1.17 steals per game.

Stith joined the Waverley Falcons for the 2023 NBL1 South season. He averaged 22 points and nine rebounds per game.

For the 2023–24 season, Stith joined BBC Arantia Larochette of the Luxembourg Basketball League.

Stith joined the Casey Cavaliers for the 2024 NBL1 South season. In 22 games, he averaged 18.91 points, 7.68 rebounds, 2.5 assists and 1.14 steals per game.

On July 2, 2024, Stith signed with the Cairns Taipans for the 2024–25 NBL season. In 14 games, he averaged 1.3 points and 1.3 rebounds in 8.9 minutes per game.

After initially being set to re-join the Casey Cavaliers, Stith joined the Kilsyth Cobras for the 2025 NBL1 South season. In 20 games for the Cobras, he averaged 16.5 points, 7.35 rebounds, 3.0 assists and 1.1 steals per game.

In November 2025, Stith re-signed with the Kilsyth Cobras for the 2026 NBL1 South season.

== National team ==
In March 2025, Stith was named in the Australia men's national 3x3 team for the FIBA 3x3 Champions Cup in Bangkok, Thailand. He helped the team win the bronze medal. Later that month, he helped Australia win gold at the 2025 FIBA 3x3 Asia Cup, where he won the tournament MVP. In June 2025, he was named in the Australia 3x3 team for the 2025 FIBA 3x3 World Cup in Mongolia.

In March 2026, Stith was named in the Australia 3x3 team for the 2026 FIBA 3x3 Champions Cup. The following month, he played at the 2026 FIBA 3x3 Asia Cup.

== Personal life ==
Stith is the son of John Stith and Leesa Mallory. His older brother, Jeff Mallory, also played professional basketball.

Stith obtained Australian citizenship in February 2023.
