= 2019 FIBA 3x3 Asia Cup – Men's tournament =

2019 FIBA 3x3 Asia Cup Women's tournament
Tournament information
- Location: Changsha, China
- Dates: May 22–26
- Host(s): China
- Venue(s): Changsha Shopping Mall
- Teams: 18

The 2019 FIBA 3x3 Asia Cup is the fourth edition of the FIBA Asia 3X3 Cup. The games of the final tournament were held in Changsha, China between 24 May and 26 May 2019.

== Main tournament ==
=== Preliminary round ===
==== Group A ====
Pos	Team	Pld	W	L	PF	PA	PD	Qualification	(Jordan)	(Japan)	(Turkmenistan)
1	Jordan	2	2	0	42	25	+17	Qualification to knockout stage	—	21–15	21–10
2	Japan	2	1	1	36	35	+1	Qualification to knockout stage	15–21	—	21–14
3	Turkmenistan	2	0	2	24	42	−18		10–21	14–21	—

Source: FIBA

==== Group B ====
Pos	Team	Pld	W	L	PF	PA	PD	Qualification	(China)	(Qatar)	(New Zealand)
1	China	2	2	0	42	31	+11	Qualification to knockout stage	—	21–13	21–18
2	Qatar	2	1	1	34	41	−7	Qualification to knockout stage	13–21	—	21–20
3	New Zealand	2	0	2	38	42	−4		18–21	20–21	—

Source: FIBA

==== Group C ====
Pos	Team	Pld	W	L	PF	PA	PD	Qualification	(Australia)	(Mongolia)	(South Korea)
1	Australia	2	2	0	42	25	+17	Qualification to knockout stage	—	21–8	21–17
2	Mongolia	2	1	1	28	35	−7	Qualification to knockout stage	8–21	—	20–14
3	South Korea	2	0	2	31	41	−10		17–21	14–20	—

Source: FIBA

==== Group D ====
Pos	Team	Pld	W	L	PF	PA	PD	Qualification	(Kazakhstan)	(Chinese Taipei)	(Indonesia)
1	Kazakhstan	2	2	0	38	33	+5	Qualification to knockout stage	—	21–19	17–14
2	Chinese Taipei	2	1	1	40	39	+1	Qualification to knockout stage	19–21	—	21–20
3	Indonesia	2	0	2	34	38	−4		14–17	20–21	—

Source: FIBA

=== Knockout round ===
Quarterfinals
Jordan	16
Mongolia	21
Kazakhstan	21
Qatar	17
China	21
Chinese Taipei	3
Australia	21
Japan	14

Semifinals
Mongolia	21
Kazakhstan	13
China	15
Australia	21

Final
Mongolia	9
Australia	21
3rd place
Kazakhstan	11
China	14

== Final rankings ==
#	Team	Pld	W	L	PF	PA	PD	FIBA 3x3 Ranking		
#	Team	Pld	W	L	PF	PA	PD	Old	New	+/−
1st place, gold medalist(s)	Australia	5	5	0	105	63	+42	36		
2nd place, silver medalist(s)	Mongolia	5	3	2	79	85	+23	8		
3rd place, bronze medalist(s)	China	5	4	1	92	66	+26	4		
4th	Kazakhstan	5	3	2	83	85	-2	27		
Eliminated at the quarterfinals
5th	Jordan	3	2	1	58	46	+12	55		
6th	Qatar	3	1	2	51	62	−11	30		
7th	Japan	3	1	2	50	56	−6	5		
8th	Chinese Taipei	3	1	2	43	60	−17	67		
Eliminated at the preliminary round
9th	New Zealand	2	0	2	38	42	−4	30		
10th	Indonesia	2	0	2	34	38	−4	25		
11th	South Korea	2	0	2	31	41	−10	23		
12th	Turkmenistan	2	0	2	24	42	−18	49		
