= 3x3 basketball at the 2023 East Asian Youth Games =

Basketball competition in Ulaanbaatar, Mongolia

Tournament details
- Host country: Mongolia
- City: Ulaanbaatar
- Dates: 17–18 August
- Teams: 3(men)&4(women)

3x3 Basketball was held at the 2023 East Asian Youth Games during August 17 to 18, 2023, at the Sukhbaatar Square in Ulaanbaatar, Mongolia. Only athletes born on 2005.01.01 – 2009.12.31 were allowed to participate.

== Medal table ==
* Host nation (Mongolia)

Rank	Nation	Gold	Silver	Bronze	Total
1	China (CHN)	1	1	0	2
2	Mongolia (MGL)	1	0	1	2
3	Chinese Taipei (TPE)	0	1	0	1
4	Hong Kong (HKG)	0	0	1	1
Totals (4 entries)		2	2	2	6

== Medal summary ==
Event	Gold	Silver	Bronze
Men	Mongolia	China	Hong Kong
Women	China	Chinese Taipei	Mongolia

== Men`s event ==
=== Round Robin ===
Team	Pld	W	L	PF	PA	PD	Pts
Mongolia	2	2	0	42	26	+16	4
China	2	1	1	35	33	+2	3
Hong Kong	2	0	2	21	39	−18	2

17 August 2023
15:40 UTC+8

China	18–12	Hong Kong

17 August 2023
16:40 UTC+8

Hong Kong	9–21	Mongolia

17 August 2023
17:40 UTC+8

Mongolia	21–17	China

=== Gold Medal Match ===
18 August 2023
17:00 UTC+8

Mongolia	18–15	China

== Women`s event ==
=== Round Robin ===
Team	Pld	W	L	PF	PA	PD	Pts
Chinese Taipei	3	3	0	58	44	+14	6
China	3	2	1	62	47	+15	5
Hong Kong	3	1	2	37	54	−17	4
Mongolia	3	0	3	46	58	−12	3

17 August 2023
15:00 UTC+8

Mongolia	15–18	Hong Kong

17 August 2023
15:20 UTC+8

Chinese Taipei	21–20	China

17 August 2023
16:00 UTC+8

Mongolia	15–19	Chinese Taipei

17 August 2023
16:20 UTC+8

Hong Kong	10–21	China

17 August 2023
17:00 UTC+8

Chinese Taipei	18–9	Hong Kong

17 August 2023
17:20 UTC+8

China	21–16	Mongolia

=== Bronze Medal Match ===
18 August 2023
16:00 UTC+8

Hong Kong	10–12	Mongolia

=== Gold Medal Match ===
18 August 2023
16:30 UTC+8

Chinese Taipei	15–21	China
