= 2024 FIBA 3x3 Asia Cup – Men's tournament =

Tournament details
- Host country: Singapore
- City: Singapore
- Dates: 27–31 March
- Teams: 23
- Venue: Singapore Sports Hub OCBC Square

Final positions
- Champions: Australia (4th title)
- Runners-up: Iran
- Third place: Mongolia
- Fourth place: New Zealand

The 2024 FIBA 3x3 Asia Cup – Men's tournament was the seventh edition of this continental championship. The event was held in Singapore. It was contested by 23 teams.

Mongolia are the defending champions.

Australia won their fourth title, beating first time finalists Iran in the final.

== Host selection ==
Singapore was given the hosting rights on 3 October 2022 after they signed a three-year contract to host the 2023, 2024 and 2025 editions of the tournament.

== Participating teams ==
All National Federations in the Asia and Oceania region were invited to register a team for the 2024 FIBA 3x3 Asia Cup.

Preliminary round

Pool A

- China (1)
- Singapore (H) (16)
- Qualifier Pool A

Pool B

- Mongolia (2)
- Thailand (7)
- Qualifier Pool B

Pool C

- Japan (3)
- Philippines (6)
- Qualifier Pool C

Pool D

- New Zealand (4)
- Qatar (5)
- Qualifier Pool D

Qualifying draw

Pool A

- Chinese Taipei (8)
- Iran (15)
- Hong Kong (17)

Pool B

- South Korea (9)
- Indonesia (14)
- Sri Lanka (18)
- Northern Mariana Islands (23)

Pool C

- Australia (10)
- Kazakhstan (13)
- Kyrgyzstan (19)
- Tahiti (22)

Pool D

- Malaysia (11)
- India (12)
- Maldives (20)
- Macau (21)

== Venue ==
The venue was at the OCBC Square, Singapore Sports Hub.

2024 FIBA 3x3 Asia Cup – Men's tournament is located in Singapore	Singapore
2024 FIBA 3x3 Asia Cup – Men's tournament is located in Singapore	OCBC Square, Singapore Sports Hub

== Medalists ==
Event	Gold	Silver	Bronze
Men's team	Australia; Todd Blanchfield; Joshua Davey; William Hickey; James O'Donnell	Iran; Matin Aghajanpour; Ehsan Dalirzahan; Mohammadmahdi Rahimi; Majid Rahimian	Mongolia; Altangereliin Azbayar; Ariunboldyn Anand; Chingisiin Temüülen; Sandagdorjiin Binderiya

== Qualifying draw ==
The four group winners qualified for the next round.

=== Pool A ===
Pos	Team	Pld	W	L	PF	PA	PD	Qualification	(Iran)	(Chinese Taipei)	(Hong Kong)
1	Iran	2	2	0	41	20	+21	Preliminary round			20–10
2	Chinese Taipei	2	1	1	29	38	−9		10–21		19–17
3	Hong Kong	2	0	2	27	39	−12				

Source: FIBA
Rules for classification: 1) Wins; 2) Head-to-head record; 3) Points scored.

=== Pool B ===
Pos	Team	Pld	W	L	PF	PA	PD	Qualification	(Sri Lanka)	(Indonesia)	(South Korea)	(Northern Mariana Islands)
1	Sri Lanka	3	3	0	63	46	+17	Preliminary round			21–19	
2	Indonesia	3	2	1	43	42	+1		14–21			16–10
3	South Korea	3	1	2	51	42	+9			11–13 OT		21–8
4	Northern Mariana Islands	3	0	3	31	58	−27		13–21			

Source: FIBA
Rules for classification: 1) Wins; 2) Head-to-head record; 3) Points scored.

=== Pool C ===
Pos	Team	Pld	W	L	PF	PA	PD	Qualification	(Australia)	(Kazakhstan)	(Kyrgyzstan)	(French Polynesia)
1	Australia	3	3	0	60	18	+42	Preliminary round		18–7		21–5
2	Kazakhstan	3	2	1	42	43	−1				18–14	17–11
3	Kyrgyzstan	3	1	2	31	48	−17		6–21			
4	Tahiti	3	0	3	25	49	−24				9–11 OT	

Source: FIBA
Rules for classification: 1) Wins; 2) Head-to-head record; 3) Points scored.

=== Pool D ===
Pos	Team	Pld	W	L	PF	PA	PD	Qualification	(Malaysia)	(India)	(Macau)	(Maldives)
1	Malaysia	3	3	0	63	30	+33	Preliminary round		21–9	21–15	
2	India	3	2	1	51	44	+7				21–13	21–10
3	Macau	3	1	2	49	55	−6					21–13
4	Maldives	3	0	3	29	63	−34		6–21			

Source: FIBA
Rules for classification: 1) Wins; 2) Head-to-head record; 3) Points scored.

== Preliminary round ==
=== Pool A ===
Pos	Team	Pld	W	L	PF	PA	PD	Qualification	(Iran)	(China)	(Singapore)
1	Iran	2	2	0	36	25	+11	quarter-finals			
2	China	2	1	1	34	30	+4	quarter-finals	13–15		21–15
3	Singapore (H)	2	0	2	27	42	−15		12–21		

Source: FIBA
Rules for classification: 1) Wins; 2) Head-to-head record; 3) Points scored.
(H) Hosts

=== Pool B ===
Pos	Team	Pld	W	L	PF	PA	PD	Qualification	(Mongolia)	(Thailand)	(Sri Lanka)
1	Mongolia	2	2	0	35	27	+8	quarter-finals		20–14	15–13 OT
2	Thailand	2	1	1	35	29	+6	quarter-finals			21–9
3	Sri Lanka	2	0	2	22	36	−14				

Source: FIBA
Rules for classification: 1) Wins; 2) Head-to-head record; 3) Points scored.

=== Pool C ===
Pos	Team	Pld	W	L	PF	PA	PD	Qualification	(Australia)	(Japan)	(Philippines)
1	Australia	2	2	0	41	26	+15	quarter-finals		20–13	21–13
2	Japan	2	1	1	35	32	+3	quarter-finals			22–12
3	Philippines	2	0	2	25	43	−18				

Source: FIBA
Rules for classification: 1) Wins; 2) Head-to-head record; 3) Points scored.

=== Pool D ===
Pos	Team	Pld	W	L	PF	PA	PD	Qualification	(New Zealand)	(Qatar)	(Malaysia)
1	New Zealand	2	2	0	43	22	+21	quarter-finals		22–3	21–19 OT
2	Qatar	2	1	1	19	37	−18	quarter-finals			16–15
3	Malaysia	2	0	2	34	37	−3				

Source: FIBA
Rules for classification: 1) Wins; 2) Head-to-head record; 3) Points scored.

== Knockout stage ==
All times are local.

Quarter-finals
31 March − 12:20
Iran	14
Japan	12
31 March − 11:50
New Zealand	21
Thailand	17
31 March − 14:40
Mongolia	19
Qatar	11
31 March − 14:15
Australia	21
China	15

Semi-finals
31 March − 16:00
Iran	21
New Zealand	11
31 March − 16:25
Mongolia	11
Australia	21

Final
31 March − 19:45
Iran	7
Australia	21
Bronze medal
31 March − 18:55
New Zealand	18
Mongolia	21

== Final standings ==
Pos	Team	Pld	W	L	W%	PF	PA
1	Australia	5	5	0	100%	104	20.8
2	Iran	5	4	1	80%	78	15.6
3	Mongolia	5	4	1	80%	86	17.2
4	New Zealand	5	3	2	60%	93	18.6
5	Thailand	3	1	2	33%	52	17.3
6	China	3	1	2	33%	49	16.3
7	Japan	3	1	2	33%	47	15.7
8	Qatar	3	1	2	33%	30	10.0
9	Malaysia	2	0	2	0%	34	17.0
10	Singapore	2	0	2	0%	27	13.5
11	Philippines	2	0	2	0%	25	12.5
12	Sri Lanka	2	0	2	0%	22	11.0

Eliminated in the qualifying draw

Pos	Team	Pld	W	L	W%	PF	PA
13	India	3	2	1	67%	51	17.0
14	Indonesia	3	2	1	67%	43	14.3
15	Kazakhstan	3	2	1	67%	42	14.0
16	Chinese Taipei	2	1	1	50%	29	14.5
17	South Korea	3	1	2	33%	51	17.0
18	Macau	3	1	2	33%	49	16.3
19	Kyrgyzstan	3	1	2	33%	31	10.3
20	Hong Kong	2	0	2	0%	27	13.5
21	Northern Mariana Islands	3	0	3	0%	31	10.3
22	Maldives	3	0	3	0%	29	9.7
23	Tahiti	3	0	3	0%	25	8.3

== Awards ==
Team of the tournament
(Australia) Todd Blanchfield	(Iran) Ehsan Dalirzahan	(Mongolia) Anand Ariunbold
Most valuable player
(Australia) Todd Blanchfield
Top scorer
(Australia) Todd Blanchfield (47 points)

== See also ==
- 2024 FIBA 3x3 Asia Cup – Women's tournament
- 2024 FIBA 3x3 AmeriCup – Men's tournament
- 2024 FIBA 3x3 AmeriCup – Women's tournament
- 2024 FIBA 3x3 Europe Cup – Men's tournament
- 2024 FIBA 3x3 Europe Cup – Women's tournament
- 2024 FIBA 3x3 Africa Cup – Men's tournament
- 2024 FIBA 3x3 Africa Cup – Women's tournament
