= Sam McDaniel (basketball) =

Australian basketball player

No. 26 – Brisbane Bullets
- Position: Shooting guard / small forward
- League: NBL

Personal information
- Born: 9 December 1995 (age 30) Hobart, Tasmania, Australia
- Listed height: 198 cm (6 ft 6 in)
- Listed weight: 102 kg (225 lb)

Career information
- High school: Southern Vales Christian College (Adelaide, South Australia)
- College: Southeastern CC (2014–2016); Louisiana–Monroe (2016–2018)
- Playing career: 2012–present

Career history
- 2012–2014: Southern Tigers
- 2018: Mount Gambier Pioneers
- 2018–2021: Melbourne United
- 2019: Sandringham Sabres
- 2021–2023: Tasmania JackJumpers
- 2022–2023: Hobart Chargers
- 2023–present: Brisbane Bullets
- 2024–2025: Brisbane Capitals
- 2026: Ipswich Force

Career highlights
- NBL champion (2021); NBL1 South champion (2022); NBL1 South Grand Final MVP (2022); NBL1 North MVP (2024); 2× NBL1 North First Team (2024, 2025); NBL1 North Second Team (2026); NBL1 North Defensive Player of the Year (2024); NBL1 South Defensive Player of the Year (2023); Third-team All-Sun Belt (2018); Second-team All-ICCAC D1 (2016)
Medals
Representing Australia
Men's basketball
FIBA Asia Cup
| Gold medal – first place | 2022 Jakarta |
Men's 3x3 basketball
Commonwealth Games
| Silver medal – second place | 2026 Glasgow | Team |

Samuel McDaniel (born 9 December 1995) is an Australian professional basketball player for the Brisbane Bullets of the National Basketball League (NBL). He played college basketball for Southeastern Community College and Louisiana–Monroe.

== Early life ==
Born in Hobart, Tasmania, McDaniel was raised by his mother in Adelaide, South Australia, and attended Southern Vales Christian College in the suburb of Morphett Vale. He played soccer while growing up but switched to basketball after a bad experience with a junior soccer coach at age 14. McDaniel played in the Central ABL for the Southern Tigers between 2012 and 2014.

== College career ==
Between 2014 and 2016, McDaniel played college basketball for Southeastern Community College. He averaged 13 points and 8.2 rebounds during his sophomore year.

For his junior season, McDaniel transferred to Louisiana–Monroe. In 65 games over two seasons, he averaged 13.2 points, 6.0 rebounds and 1.8 assists for the Warhawks.

== Professional career ==
In May 2018, McDaniel joined the Mount Gambier Pioneers of the South East Australian Basketball League (SEABL). In eight games, he averaged 16.9 points, 7.0 rebounds, 2.3 assists and 1.5 steals per game.

In August 2018, McDaniel joined Melbourne United as a development player for the 2018–19 NBL season. He appeared in 12 games during the season.

After playing for the Sandringham Sabres during the 2019 NBL1 season, McDaniel re-joined United for the 2019–20 NBL season as a fully contracted player. He averaged 1.4 points in 19 games.

In August 2020, McDaniel re-signed with United for the 2020–21 NBL season. He played a key role on the defensive end during the season and helped Melbourne win the championship.

On 1 July 2021, McDaniel signed a three-year deal with the Tasmania JackJumpers, a franchise entering the NBL for the first time in 2021–22. Following the NBL season, he joined the Hobart Chargers of the NBL1 South and helped them win the 2022 championship while earning grand final MVP honours.

In the 2022–23 NBL season, McDaniel appeared in 14 games for the JackJumpers. Following the season, he declined the player option on his contract. He then re-joined the Chargers for the 2023 NBL1 South season, where he won the NBL1 South Defensive Player of the Year.

On 31 March 2023, McDaniel signed a two-year deal with the Brisbane Bullets. Following the 2023–24 NBL season, he joined the Brisbane Capitals of the NBL1 North, where he won the league's Defensive Player of the Year, earned First Team honours, and was named the Most Valuable Player for the 2024 season.

On 26 September 2024, McDaniel was ruled out of the 2024–25 NBL season after he aggravated a shoulder injury that was originally sustained during his stint with the Capitals. His recovery was expected to take up to six months. He returned to the Brisbane Capitals for the 2025 NBL1 season, where he was again named NBL1 North All Star First Team.

On 19 February 2025, McDaniel re-signed with the Bullets on a two-year deal. On 3 October 2025, he was ruled out for eight weeks with an ankle injury that he sustained during the Bullets' round two game against the Cairns Taipans. He was cleared to return to action on 2 December 2025. On 8 January 2026, he was ruled out for at least four weeks with a calf injury.

McDaniel joined the Ipswich Force for the 2026 NBL1 North season. He was named to the NBL1 North All Star Five Second Team.

On 17 April 2026, McDaniel re-signed with the Bullets on a new two-year deal. On 3 September 2026, he was ruled out for a month with a hand injury. After making his season debut in early October, he was ruled out again for six weeks with a lower-leg injury. He returned to the line-up on 22 November.

== National team ==
In March 2026, McDaniel was named in the Australia men's national 3x3 team for the FIBA 3x3 Champions Cup. The following month, he played at the 2026 FIBA 3x3 Asia Cup. In June 2026, he was selected for the Australian 3x3 team for the 2026 Commonwealth Games in Glasgow. The team went on to win the silver medal.

== Personal life ==
McDaniel's father, Wayne McDaniel, also played in the NBL for the Adelaide 36ers, Geelong Supercats, Newcastle Falcons and Hobart Devils.

McDaniel has a daughter.
