= 2022 FIBA 3x3 Asia Cup =

Basketball tournament in Singapore

Tournament information
- Location: Singapore
- Dates: 6–10 July 2022
- Host(s): Singapore
- Website: www.fiba.basketball/3x3asiacup/2022/games

Final positions
- Champions: M: Australia (3rd title); W: China (1st title)
- Runner-up: M: New Zealand; W: Australia
- 3rd place: M: China; W: Indonesia

The 2022 FIBA 3x3 Asia Cup was the fifth edition of the FIBA 3x3 Asia Cup. The games of the final tournament were held in Singapore between 6 July and 10 July 2022.

== Participating teams ==
The FIBA 3x3 Asia Cup returns for its fifth edition this year and will see 53 teams from 30 countries battling it out to win the trophy. Set to take place from July 6-10 at the event plaza of Marina Bay Sands, the game - with its rising popularity over the years - has reached a significant high in participation numbers. The previous record was set in 2019 with 40 teams from 23 countries.

A total of 30 men’s teams and 23 women’s teams have registered for the number one 3x3 national team competition for teams based in Asia and Oceania. The main draw will start on the third day of competition with the exact same number of teams (12) from each gender.

== Main tournaments ==
=== Men ===
Pool A

- Mongolia
- South Korea
- India

Pool B

- Australia
- New Zealand
- Qatar

Pool C

- Singapore
- China
- Philippines

Pool D

- Japan
- Chinese Taipei
- Uzbekistan

=== Women ===
Pool A

- Mongolia
- Thailand
- Uzbekistan

Pool B

- Singapore
- Japan
- Indonesia

Pool C

- Australia
- China
- New Zealand

Pool D

- Chinese Taipei
- Sri Lanka
- Turkmenistan

== Medalists ==
Event	Gold	Silver	Bronze
Men's team Details	Australia; Greg Hire; Daniel Johnson; Andrew Steel; Jesse Wagstaff	New Zealand; Jayden Bezzant; Zach Easthope; Dominique Kelman-Poto; Nikau McCullough	China; Liu Zeyi; Lyu Junhu; Zhao Jiaren; Zhao Jiayi
Women's team Details	China; Huang Kun; Wan Jiyuan; Wang Lili; Zhang Zhiting	Australia; Anneli Maley; Lauren Mansfield; Lauren Scherf; Marena Whittle	Indonesia; Adelaide Callista Wongsohardjo; Dyah Lestari; Kimberley Pierre-Louis; Agustin Elya Gradita Retong

== Men's tournament ==
=== Preliminary round ===
==== Group A ====
Pos	Team	Pld	W	L	PF	PA	PD	Qualification	(Mongolia)	(South Korea)	(India)
1	Mongolia	2	2	0	41	24	+17	Qualification to knockout stage	—	19–12	22–12
2	South Korea	2	1	1	30	35	−5	Qualification to knockout stage	12–19	—	18–16
3	India	2	0	2	28	40	−12		12–22	16–18	—

Source: FIBA

==== Group B ====
Pos	Team	Pld	W	L	PF	PA	PD	Qualification	(Australia)	(New Zealand)	(Qatar)
1	Australia	2	2	0	42	25	+17	Qualification to knockout stage	—	21–14	21–11
2	New Zealand	2	1	1	36	37	−1	Qualification to knockout stage	14–21	—	22–16
3	Qatar	2	0	2	27	43	−16		11–21	16–22	—

Source: FIBA

==== Group C ====
Pos	Team	Pld	W	L	PF	PA	PD	Qualification	(China)	(Philippines)	(Singapore)
1	China	2	2	0	43	24	+19	Qualification to knockout stage	—	21–11	22–13
2	Philippines	2	1	1	32	38	−6	Qualification to knockout stage	11–21	—	21–17
3	Singapore	2	0	2	30	43	−13		13–22	17–21	—

Source: FIBA

==== Group D ====
Pos	Team	Pld	W	L	PF	PA	PD	Qualification	(Japan)	(Chinese Taipei)	(Uzbekistan)
1	Japan	2	2	0	42	23	+19	Qualification to knockout stage	—	21–12	21–11
2	Chinese Taipei	2	1	1	32	35	−3	Qualification to knockout stage	12–21	—	20–14
3	Uzbekistan	2	0	2	25	41	−16		11–21	14–20	—

Source: FIBA

=== Knockout round ===
Quarter-finals
10 July
Mongolia	20
Philippines	21
10 July
Japan	14
New Zealand	16
10 July
Australia	21
Chinese Taipei	8
10 July
China	21
South Korea	13

Semi-finals
10 July
Philippines	13
New Zealand	21
10 July
Australia	21
China	13

Final
10 July
New Zealand	17
Australia	21
3rd place
10 July
Philippines	18
China	20

== Women's tournament ==
=== Preliminary round ===
==== Group A ====
Pos	Team	Pld	W	L	PF	PA	PD	Qualification	(Mongolia)	(Thailand)	(Uzbekistan)
1	Mongolia	2	2	0	28	24	+4	Qualification to knockout stage	—	13–12	15–12
2	Thailand	2	1	1	28	27	+1	Qualification to knockout stage	12–13	—	16–14
3	Uzbekistan	2	0	2	26	31	−5		12–15	14–16	—

Source: FIBA

==== Group B ====
Pos	Team	Pld	W	L	PF	PA	PD	Qualification	(Japan)	(Indonesia)	(Singapore)
1	Japan	2	2	0	28	18	+10	Qualification to knockout stage	—	17–15	11–3
2	Indonesia	2	1	1	36	32	+4	Qualification to knockout stage	15–17	—	21–15
3	Singapore	2	0	2	18	32	−14		3–11	15–21	—

Source: FIBA

==== Group C ====
Pos	Team	Pld	W	L	PF	PA	PD	Qualification	(China)	(Australia)	(New Zealand)
1	China	2	2	0	41	24	+17	Qualification to knockout stage	—	20–12	21–12
2	Australia	2	1	1	33	31	+2	Qualification to knockout stage	12–20	—	21–11
3	New Zealand	2	0	2	23	42	−19		12–21	11–21	—

Source: FIBA

==== Group D ====
Pos	Team	Pld	W	L	PF	PA	PD	Qualification	(Chinese Taipei)	(Sri Lanka)	(Turkmenistan)
1	Chinese Taipei	2	2	0	34	19	+15	Qualification to knockout stage	—	21–12	13–7
2	Sri Lanka	2	1	1	27	34	−7	Qualification to knockout stage	12–21	—	15–13
3	Turkmenistan	2	0	2	20	28	−8		7–13	13–15	—

Source: FIBA

=== Knockout round ===
Quarter-finals
10 July
Mongolia	10
Australia	21
10 July
Chinese Taipei	15
Indonesia	17
10 July
Japan	22
Sri Lanka	3
10 July
China	21
Thailand	11

Semi-finals
10 July
Australia	21
Indonesia	13
10 July
Japan	15
China	20

Final
10 July
Australia	10
China	14
3rd place
10 July
Indonesia	21
Japan	17

== Final rankings ==
=== Men ===
#	Team	Pld	W	L	PF	PA	PD	FIBA 3x3 Ranking		
#	Team	Pld	W	L	PF	PA	PD	Old	New	+/−
1st place, gold medalist(s)	Australia	5	5	0	105	63	+42	33	38	–5
2nd place, silver medalist(s)	New Zealand	5	3	2	90	85	+5	34	36	–2
3rd place, bronze medalist(s)	China	5	4	1	87	74	+13	44	30	+14
4th	Philippines	5	2	3	84	98	–14	18	22	–4
Eliminated at the quarterfinals
5th	Japan	3	2	1	56	39	+17	21	19	+2
6th	Mongolia	3	2	1	61	45	+16	8	6	+2
7th	South Korea	3	1	2	43	56	–13	57	66	–9
8th	Chinese Taipei	3	1	2	40	56	–16	28	28	0
Eliminated at the preliminary round
9th	India	2	0	2	28	40	−12	27	29	–2
10th	Singapore	2	0	2	30	43	−13	151	150	+1
11th	Qatar	2	0	2	27	43	−16	30	31	–1
12th	Uzbekistan	2	0	2	25	41	−16	46	47	–1

=== Women ===
#	Team	Pld	W	L	PF	PA	PD	FIBA 3x3 Ranking		
#	Team	Pld	W	L	PF	PA	PD	Old	New	+/−
1st place, gold medalist(s)	China	5	5	0	96	60	+36			
2nd place, silver medalist(s)	Australia	5	3	2	85	68	+17			
3rd place, bronze medalist(s)	Indonesia	5	3	2	87	85	+2			
4th	Japan	5	3	2	82	62	+20			
Eliminated at the quarterfinals
5th	Chinese Taipei	3	2	1	43	40	+13			
6th	Mongolia	3	1	2	38	45	–7			
7th	Thailand	3	1	2	39	48	–9			
8th	Sri Lanka	3	1	2	56	30	–26			
Eliminated at the preliminary round
9th	Uzbekistan	2	0	2	26	31	−5			
10th	Turkmenistan	2	0	2	20	28	−8			
11th	Singapore	2	0	2	18	32	−14			
12th	New Zealand	2	0	2	23	42	−19			

== See also ==
- FIBA
  - FIBA Asia
- 2022 FIBA Asia Cup
- 2021 FIBA Women's Asia Cup
