= William Hickey (basketball) =

Australian basketball player (born 1999)

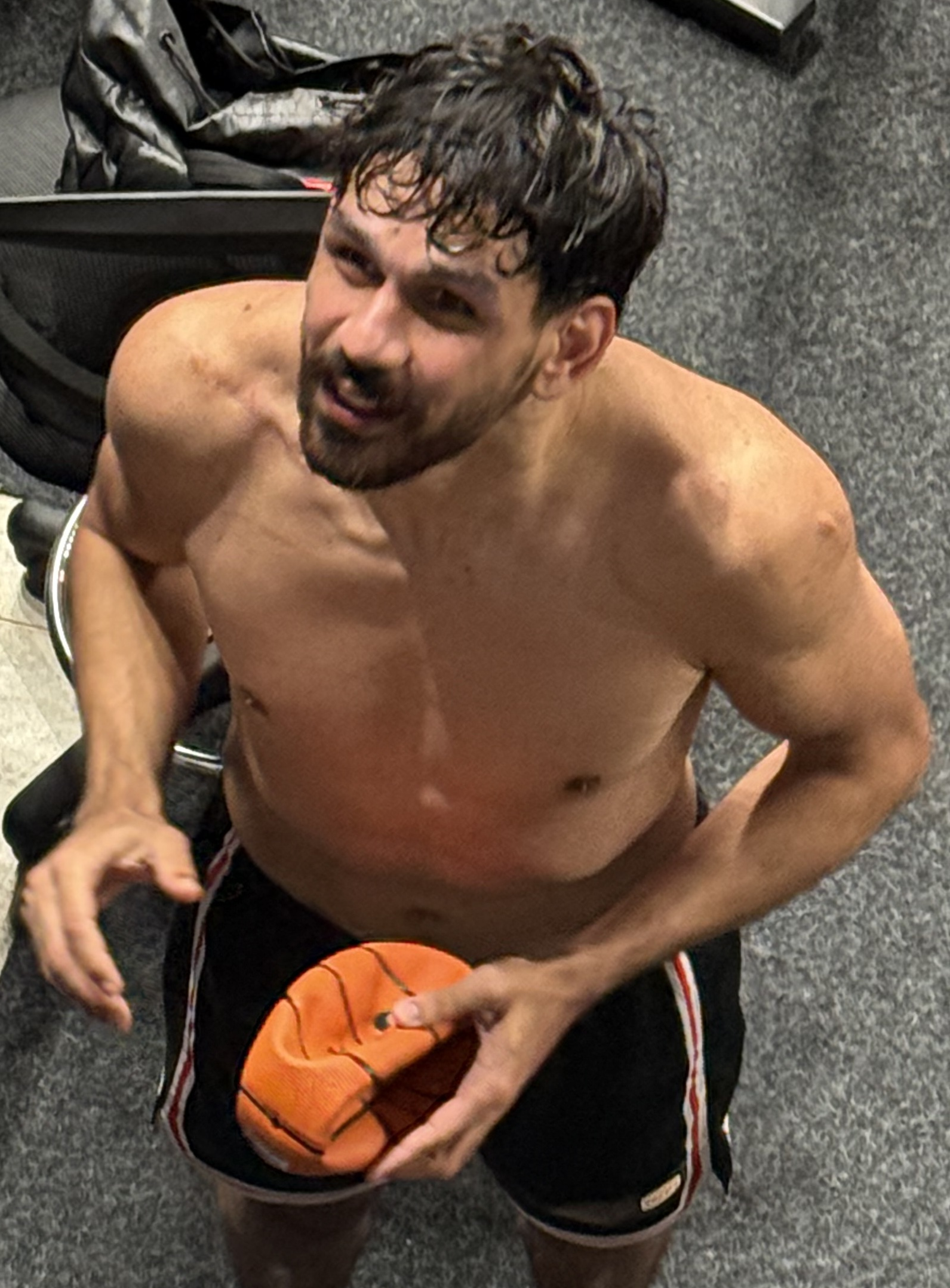
- Hickey with the Illawarra Hawks in 2025

No. 6 – Illawarra Hawks
- Position: Guard
- League: NBL

Personal information
- Born: 18 January 1999 (age 27)
- Listed height: 194 cm (6 ft 4 in)
- Listed weight: 92 kg (203 lb)

Career information
- High school: Trinity Grammar School (Sydney, New South Wales)
- NBA draft: 2021: undrafted
- Playing career: 2018–present

Career history
- 2018: Sydney Comets
- 2019: Melbourne Tigers
- 2019–2020: South East Melbourne Phoenix
- 2020: Inner West Bulls
- 2021: Ballarat Miners
- 2021–2022: Melbourne United
- 2022: Casey Cavaliers
- 2022–present: Illawarra Hawks
- 2023: Illawarra Hawks (NBL1 East)
- 2024: Albury Wodonga Bandits
- 2025: Auckland Tuatara
- 2025: Sydney Comets
- 2026: South Bay Lakers
- 2026: Hornsby Ku‑Ring‑Gai Spiders

Career highlights
- NBL champion (2025); NBL1 East All-Star Five (2024); NBL1 East Defensive Player of the Year (2024)
Medals
Men's basketball
Representing Australia
FIBA Asia Cup
Gold medal – first place	2025 Saudi Arabia

William David "Davo" Hickey (born 18 January 1999) is an Australian professional basketball player for the Illawarra Hawks of the National Basketball League (NBL). He debuted in the NBL in the 2019–20 season as a development player with the South East Melbourne Phoenix. After a season with Melbourne United in 2021–22, he joined the Illawarra Hawks in 2022 and helped them win an NBL championship in 2025. He has also consistently played in the Australian state leagues since 2018, earning NBL1 East All-Star Five and Defensive Player of the Year honours in 2024 with the Albury Wodonga Bandits. In 2025, he had a stint with the Auckland Tuatara of the New Zealand National Basketball League (NZNBL).

Hickey debuted for the Australian Boomers in 2024.

== Early life ==
As a child, Hickey grew up moving around New South Wales with his grandparents, dividing his time between Sydney, Cowra, and Walgett. He originally played rugby league and idolised Greg Inglis.

As a youth, Hickey lived in the Sydney inner southern suburb of Redfern, where he attended nearby Trinity Grammar School and was considered a highly promising basketball prospect with the Koorie Academy.

In 2019, Hickey played for the Australian Indigenous Basketball All-Stars.

== Professional career ==
=== NBL ===
In September 2019, after participating in the NBL's Next Gen camp, Hickey signed with the South East Melbourne Phoenix of the National Basketball League (NBL) as a development player for the 2019–20 season. His inexperience paired with unproven play as a ball-handler and shooter led to him appearing in only two games during the season. He found himself out of the league for the 2020–21 season.

On 9 September 2021, Hickey signed a two-year development player contract with Melbourne United. He was signed through the NBL's new Indigenous Player Rule, an initiative aimed as creating pathways for Aboriginal and Torres Strait Islander players. He appeared in seven games during the 2021–22 NBL season. United opted to decline the second year team option on his contract.

On 31 August 2022, Hickey signed with the Illawarra Hawks as a development player for the 2022–23 NBL season. He was elevated to the main roster in October 2022 ahead of opening night and quickly became a key backcourt rotation player following injuries to key personnel. In 24 games, he averaged 4.8 points, 2.8 rebounds, 1.2 assists and 1.0 steals per game.

On 21 February 2023, Hickey re-signed with the Hawks for the 2023–24 NBL season. He earned a role when Justin Tatum took over as coach midway through the season, gaining a place in the Hawks' starting lineup during the finals, where he averaged 10.2 points, 5.2 rebounds, 2.6 assists and 1.8 steals in 22 minutes, across five post-season appearances. He averaged 5.2 points per game for the season.

On 12 April 2024, the Hawks exercised the second-year option on Hickey's contract, re-signing him for the 2024–25 NBL season. After helping the Hawks start the 2024–25 season with a 5–1 record, he re-signed with the Hawks on a three-year deal on 24 October 2024. On 1 November, he scored a then career-high 20 points in a 113–105 loss to the Perth Wildcats. He earned nominations for both sixth man of the year and most improved player for the 2024–25 regular season. The Hawks went on to reach the NBL Championship Series against Melbourne United, where in game four, Hickey had a career-high 22 points to help the Hawks tie the series at 2–2 with an 80–71 win. In game five, Hickey recorded 21 points, 10 rebounds and eight assists in a 114–104 win as the Hawks won the NBL championship. United's Matthew Dellavedova was named Championship Series MVP, but presented the Larry Sengstock Trophy to Hickey when he got on stage.

Hickey missed the first six rounds of the 2025–26 NBL season after injuring his eye at the NBL Blitz pre-season tournament. On 7 November 2025, he delivered the first triple-double of the NBL season with 19 points, 12 rebounds and 12 assists in a 107–90 win over the Cairns Taipans. He also had three blocks, becoming the first player to record a triple-double with blocks since Darnell Mee in 2004. In 29 games (14 starts) for the Hawks, he averaged 12.5 points, 5.7 rebounds and 6.0 assists in 28.2 minutes per game.

On 11 November 2026, Hickey had 15 points, nine rebounds and eight assists in a 120–110 win over the South East Melbourne Phoenix.

=== NBA Summer League and NBA G League ===
In July 2025, Hickey joined the Chicago Bulls for the 2025 NBA Summer League. In three games, he averaged 2.7 points and 1.3 rebounds in 8.6 minutes per game.

On 18 March 2026, Hickey was acquired by the South Bay Lakers of the NBA G League. In his debut for the Lakers two days later, he recorded two points and two assists in 11 minutes off the bench in a 111–98 win over the Grand Rapids Gold. In four games to finish the 2025–26 season, he averaged 4.0 points, 2.8 rebounds and 1.8 assists per game.

In July 2026, Hickey joined the Los Angeles Lakers for the 2026 NBA Summer League.

=== State leagues and NZNBL ===
In 2018, Hickey played for the Sydney Comets in the Waratah League. In 14 games, he averaged 15.9 points, 7.5 rebounds, 3.4 assists and 2.4 steals per game.

Hickey joined the Melbourne Tigers of the NBL1 for the 2019 season. In 19 games, he averaged 9.3 points, 4.3 rebounds, 1.9 assists and 1.1 steals per game.

In 2020, Hickey played four games for the Inner West Bulls in the Waratah League.

Hickey joined the Ballarat Miners of the NBL1 South for the 2021 season. In 14 games, he averaged 16.6 points, 7.8 rebounds, 3.1 assists and 1.1 steals per game.

Hickey joined the Casey Cavaliers for the 2022 NBL1 South season. In 19 games, he averaged 20.9 points, 7.6 rebounds, 3.8 assists and 2.0 steals per game.

Hickey joined the Illawarra Hawks of the NBL1 East for the 2023 season. In 15 games, he averaged 22.8 points, 9.9 rebounds, 6.2 assists, 2.7 steals and 1.3 blocks per game.

Hickey joined the Albury Wodonga Bandits for the 2024 NBL1 East season. In 22 games, he averaged 22.1 points, 10.4 rebounds, 7.9 assists, 2.5 steals and 1.7 blocks per game. He was subsequently named NBL1 East All-Star Five and earned co-Defensive Player of the Year honours.

Hickey joined the Auckland Tuatara of the New Zealand National Basketball League (NZNBL) for the 2025 season. In his debut for the Tuatara on 4 April, he had the club's first triple-double in their history with 29 points, 11 rebounds and 11 assists in a 102–92 win over the Southland Sharks. Two days later, he had his second straight triple-double with 31 points, 11 rebounds and 10 assists in a 97–94 win over the Otago Nuggets. On 13 April, he recorded 31 points, 11 rebounds and 10 assists in a 106–97 win over the Hawke's Bay Hawks. On 8 May, he was issued a two-game suspension for an offensive comment made towards a match official during a game on 30 April. Five days later, he was granted an immediate release from his contract. In seven games for the Tuatara, he averaged 26.1 points, 9.3 rebounds, 7.3 assists and 1.3 steals per game.

After leaving the Tuatara, Hickey joined the Sydney Comets of the NBL1 East. He was deemed ineligible for finals due to not playing enough regular season games. In five games during the 2025 NBL1 season, he averaged 18.4 points, 9.0 rebounds, 3.8 assists, 1.0 steals and 1.8 blocks per game.

In May 2026, Hickey joined the Hornsby Ku‑Ring‑Gai Spiders for the rest of the 2026 NBL1 East season.

== National team ==
In March 2024, Hickey helped the Australia 3x3 team win gold at the FIBA 3x3 Asia Cup.

In November 2024, Hickey debuted for the Australian Boomers during the 2025 FIBA Asia Cup qualifiers. In July 2025, he was named in the Boomers squad in the lead up to the 2025 FIBA Asia Cup in Saudi Arabia. He helped the team win the FIBA Asia Cup gold medal.

In October 2025, Hickey was named in the Boomers squad for the first window of the FIBA Basketball World Cup 2027 Asian Qualifiers.

== Personal life ==
Hickey is a Wiradjuri and Gamilaroi man. He was named after his grandfather, Indigenous rights activist Billy Craigie.
