= Australia men's national 3x3 team =

National 3x3 basketball team

Australia
- FIBA ranking: 29
- FIBA zone: FIBA Oceania
- National federation: Basketball Australia
- Coach: Adam Forde

World Cup
- Appearances: 4

Asia Cup
- Appearances: 8
- Medals: Gold: (2018, 2019, 2022, 2024, 2025); Silver: (2023); Bronze: (2017)
| Home | Away |
Medal record
Men's 3x3
Champions Cup
| Bronze medal – third place | 2025 Bangkok | Team |
Representing Australia
Asia Cup
| Gold medal – first place | 2018 Shenzhen |
| Gold medal – first place | 2019 Changsha |
| Gold medal – first place | 2022 Singapore |
| Gold medal – first place | 2024 Singapore |
| Gold medal – first place | 2025 Singapore |
| Silver medal – second place | 2023 Singapore |
| Bronze medal – third place | 2017 Ulaanbaatar |

The Australia men's national 3x3 team is a national basketball team of Australia, governed by Basketball Australia.

== Competitions ==
=== Summer Olympics ===
| Year | Position | Pld | W | L | Players |
|---|---|---|---|---|---|
| (Japan) 2020 Tokyo | did not qualify | | | | |
| (France) 2024 Paris | did not enter the qualifying tournament | | | | |
| (United States) 2028 Los Angeles | future competitions | | | | |
| (Australia) 2032 Brisbane | future competitions | | | | |
| Total | 2/2 | 17 | 12 | 5 | |

=== 3x3 World Cup ===
| Year | Position | Pld | W | L | Players |
|---|---|---|---|---|---|
| (Greece) 2012 Athens | did not qualify | | | | |
| (Russia) 2014 Moscow | did not qualify | | | | |
| (China) 2016 Guangzhou | did not qualify | | | | |
| (France) 2017 Nantes | did not qualify | | | | |
| (Philippines) 2018 Bocaue | did not qualify | | | | |
| (Netherlands) 2019 Amsterdam | 10th | 4 | 2 | 2 | Coenraad, Hire, Steel, Wright |
| (Belgium) 2022 Antwerp | did not qualify | | | | |
| (Austria) 2023 Vienna | 15th | 4 | 1 | 3 | Johnson, McCarron, Steel, Walker |
| (Mongolia) 2025 Ulaanbaatar | 10th | 5 | 3 | 2 | Antonio, Davey, Higgins-Titsha, Stith |
| (Poland) 2026 Warsaw | 19th | 4 | 0 | 4 | Antonio, Bairstow, Barker, Higgins-Titsha |
| 2027 Singapore | To be determined | | | | |
| Total | 3/11 | 17 | 6 | 11 | |

=== 3x3 Asia Cup ===
| Year | Position | Pld | W | L | Players |
|---|---|---|---|---|---|
| (Mongolia) 2017 Ulaanbaatar | 3rd | 7 | 5 | 2 | Barker, Harding, Odigie, Steel |
| (China) 2018 Shenzhen | 1st | 10 | 10 | 0 | Garlepp, Odigie, Steel, Wright |
| (China) 2019 Changsha | 1st | 5 | 5 | 0 | Coenraad, Hire, Walker, Wright |
| 2022 Singapore | 1st | 5 | 5 | 0 | Hire, Johnson, Steel, Wagstaff |
| 2023 Singapore | 2nd | 5 | 4 | 1 | Blanchfield, Johnson, Steel, Walker |
| 2024 Singapore | 1st | 5 | 5 | 0 | Blanchfield, Davey, Hickey, O'Donnell |
| 2025 Singapore | 1st | 5 | 4 | 1 | Antonio, Barker, Higgins-Titsha, Stith |
| 2026 Singapore | 7th | 3 | 1 | 2 | Antonio, McDaniel, Mitchell, Stith |
| Total | | 45 | 39 | 6 | |

=== Commonwealth Games ===
| Year | Position | Pld | W | L | Players |
|---|---|---|---|---|---|
| (England) 2022 Birmingham | 2nd | 6 | 4 | 2 | Hire, Johnson, Wagstaff, Wright |
| (Scotland) 2026 Glasgow | TBD | | | | Antonio, Bairstow, McDaniel, Wagstaff |
| Total | | 6 | 4 | 2 | |

=== Champions Cup ===
| Year | Position | Pld | W | L |
|---|---|---|---|---|
| (Thailand) 2025 Bangkok | 3rd (bronze) | 5 | 3 | 2 |
| (Thailand) 2026 Bangkok | 5th | 5 | 1 | 2 |
| Total | 2/2 | 8 | 4 | 4 |

== Honours ==
=== Medals table ===
| Games | Gold | Silver | Bronze | Total |
| Olympic Games | 0 | 0 | 0 | 0 |
| 3x3 World Cup | 0 | 0 | 0 | 0 |
| 3x3 Asia Cup | 5 | 1 | 1 | 6 |
| Commonwealth Games | 0 | 1 | 0 | 1 |
| Grand totals | 5 | 2 | 1 | 7 |

=== Individual awards ===
- FIBA 3x3 Asia Cup MVP
  - Tom Garlepp – 2018
  - Tom Wright – 2019
  - Jesse Wagstaff – 2022
  - Todd Blanchfield – 2024
- FIBA 3x3 Asia Cup All-Tournament Team
  - Lucas Barker – 2017
  - Tom Garlepp – 2018
  - Tom Wright – 2019
  - Jesse Wagstaff – 2022
  - Daniel Johnson – 2023
  - Todd Blanchfield – 2024

== See also ==
- Australia women's national 3x3 team
- Australia men's national basketball team
- Australia women's national basketball team
