= New Zealand men's national 3x3 team =

National 3x3 basketball team

New Zealand
- FIBA ranking: 35
- FIBA zone: FIBA Oceania
- National federation: Basketball New Zealand

World Cup
- Appearances: 6

Asia Cup
- Appearances: 8
- Medals: Gold: (2026); Silver: (2017, 2022); Bronze: (2025)

The New Zealand men's national 3x3 team is the 3x3 basketball team representing New Zealand in international men's competitions.

The team competed at the 2022 Commonwealth Games in Birmingham, England.

== Tournament record ==
=== World Cup ===
Year	Position	Pld	W	L
(Greece) 2012 Athens	Did not qualify			
(Russia) 2014 Moscow	12th	6	3	3
(China) 2016 Guangzhou	19th	4	0	4
(France) 2017 Nantes	14th	4	1	3
(Philippines) 2018 Bocaue	14th	4	1	3
(Netherlands) 2019 Amsterdam	Did not qualify			
(Belgium) 2022 Antwerp	10th	5	2	3
(Austria) 2023 Vienna	Did not qualify			
(Mongolia) 2025 Ulaanbaatar	Did not qualify			
(Poland) 2026 Warsaw	10th	5	2	3
2027 Singapore	To be determined			
Total	6/11	28	9	19

=== 3x3 Asia Cup ===
- 2017 – 2nd
- 2018 – 4th
- 2019 – 9th
- 2022 – 2nd
- 2023 – 3rd
- 2024 – 4th
- 2025 – 3rd
- 2026 – 1st
