= Jesse Wagstaff =

Australian basketball player (born 1986)

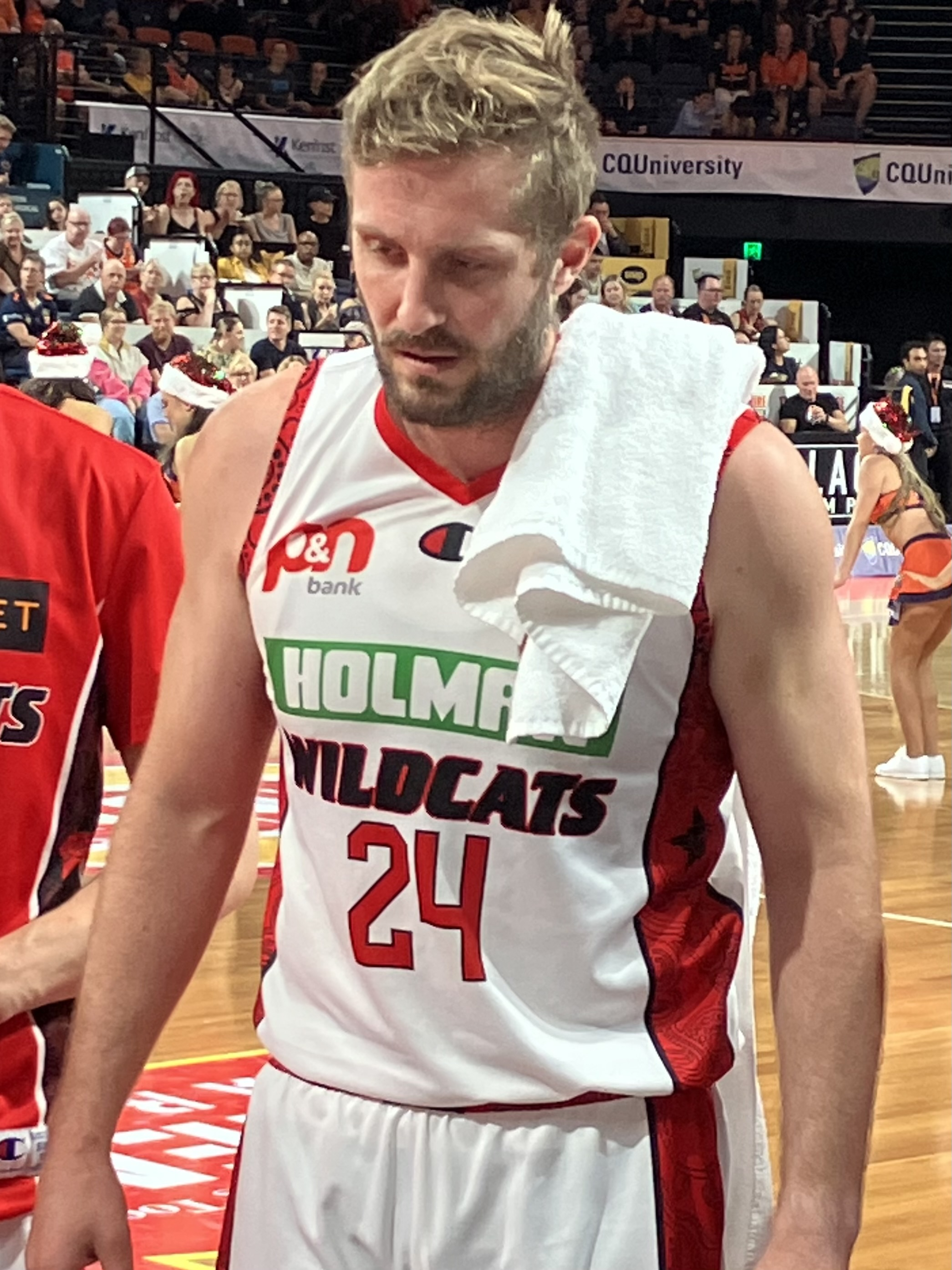
- Wagstaff with the Perth Wildcats in 2022

No. 24 – Perth Wildcats
- Position: Power forward
- League: NBL

Personal information
- Born: 30 April 1986 (age 40) Canberra, ACT, Australia
- Listed height: 203 cm (6 ft 8 in)
- Listed weight: 103 kg (227 lb)

Career information
- High school: Radford College (Canberra, ACT)
- College: Metro State (2005–2009)
- NBA draft: 2009: undrafted
- Playing career: 2004–present

Career history
- 2004: ACT Academy of Sport
- 2005: Canberra Nationals
- 2009: Canberra Gunners
- 2009–present: Perth Wildcats
- 2010–2011: Perth Redbacks

Career highlights
- 6× NBL champion (2010, 2014, 2016, 2017, 2019, 2020); NBL Cup winner (2021); All-NBL Third Team (2012); NBL Best Sixth Man (2012); NBL Rookie of the Year (2010); RMAC East Division Player of the Year (2009); 2× First-team All-RMAC East Division (2008, 2009); 2× RMAC Tournament MVP (2007, 2009)
Medals
Representing Australia
Commonwealth Games
Men's basketball
Gold medal – first place	2018 Gold Coast	Team
Men's 3x3 basketball
Silver medal – second place	2022 Birmingham	Team
Silver medal – second place	2026 Glasgow	Team

Jesse Kendall James Wagstaff (born 30 April 1986) is an Australian professional basketball player for the Perth Wildcats of the National Basketball League (NBL). After playing college basketball for the Metro State Roadrunners in the United States, he joined the Wildcats in 2009 and won Rookie of the Year and a championship in his first season in the NBL. He went on to earn NBL Best Sixth Man in 2012 and then won five more championships in 2014, 2016, 2017, 2019 and 2020. In November 2024, he played his 483rd game for the Wildcats, breaking the club's all-time games played record. He has also represented Australia in two Commonwealth Games including gold at Gold Coast 2018 and silver at Birmingham 2022.

== Early life and career ==
Wagstaff was born in Canberra, where he graduated from Radford College in 2003 and attended Australian National University in 2004–05. He represented Australia at the 2004 Oceania Youth Tournament, where he averaged 19 points and eight rebounds per game. During this period, he also played semi-professionally, competing in the Waratah League for the ACT Academy of Sport in 2004 and the Canberra Nationals in 2005.

== College career ==
As a freshman with the Metro State Roadrunners in 2005–06, Wagstaff started seven games and played in all 31 contests as he averaged 5.2 points and 3.3 rebounds. He was named to the RMAC All-Tournament team after scoring 35 points and grabbing 15 rebounds in the three games.

As a sophomore in 2006–07, Wagstaff was named honorable mention All-RMAC East Division after averaging 11.7 points and a team-leading 6.7 rebounds per game. He played in all 32 games, including 31 starts, averaging 27.1 minutes per game. He was named Most Valuable Player of the RMAC Tournament.

As a junior in 2007–08, Wagstaff was named first-team All-RMAC East Division and led the team in scoring and rebounding, while starting all 31 games. He averaged 14.7 points, 6.4 rebounds, 2.0 assists and 1.3 steals per game.

As a senior in 2008–09, Wagstaff earned RMAC East Division Player of the Year honours to go with first-team All-RMAC East Division and Most Valuable Player of the RMAC Tournament. In 31 games (30 starts), he averaged 17.8 points, 7.5 rebounds, 1.6 assists and 1.7 steals per game.

Wagstaff was named first-team RMAC All-Academic as a sophomore, junior and senior.

== Professional career ==
=== Perth Wildcats (2009–present) ===
Out of college, Wagstaff was set to sign with the South Dragons, the reigning NBL champions. After the team folded in May 2009, he had a one-game stint with the Canberra Gunners in the South East Australian Basketball League before signing a two-year deal with the Perth Wildcats in June 2009. With veteran centre Paul Rogers injured early in the 2009–10 season, Wagstaff benefitted from the increased opportunities afforded to him in Rogers' absence. He averaged 9.0 points and 3.6 rebounds in 33 games and earned NBL Rookie of the Year. He helped the Wildcats win the 2010 championship with a 2–1 grand final series victory over the Wollongong Hawks.

During the NBL off-season, Wagstaff played for the Perth Redbacks of the State Basketball League (SBL). In 26 games during the 2010 season, he averaged 21.1 points and 9.7 rebounds per game.

In December of the 2010–11 NBL season, Wagstaff sustained an ankle injury that forced him out for seven weeks. The Wildcats finished fourth with a 16–12 record and lost 2–1 in the semi-finals to the New Zealand Breakers. In 22 games, Wagstaff averaged 8.4 points and 4.3 rebounds per game.

During the NBL off-season, Wagstaff had an eight-game stint with the Perth Redbacks during the 2011 SBL season. He averaged 22.4 points and 10.8 rebounds.

In May 2011, Wagstaff re-signed with the Wildcats on a three-year deal. For the 2011–12 season, Wagstaff was named the NBL Best Sixth Man after averaging a career-high 11.5 points per game off the bench. He also earned All-NBL Third Team honours. He helped the Wildcats reach the NBL Grand Final series, where they lost 2–1 to the New Zealand Breakers.

Wagstaff helped the Wildcats return to the NBL Grand Final in the 2012–13 season, where they again faced the New Zealand Breakers and lost 2–0. In 31 games, he averaged 10.3 points and 3.7 rebounds per game.

Wagstaff helped the Wildcats reach a third straight grand final in the 2013–14 season, this time winning the series 2–1 over the Adelaide 36ers to win the NBL championship. In 33 games, he averaged 10.5 points and 3.7 rebounds per game, while shooting a career-best 42.7% from 3-point range.

On 8 May 2014, Wagstaff re-signed with the Wildcats on a two-year deal (with the option of a third). On 24 October 2014, Wagstaff was involved in an ugly on-court incident with Sydney Kings forward Josh Childress. With the Wildcats holding a hefty lead late in the third term of their 84–63 win, Childress hit the floor after running into an off-ball screen from Wagstaff under the Wildcats basket. After getting to his feet, Childress responded by running into Wagstaff with a raised forearm just as Wagstaff got off a shot. The vision of the incident was seen around the world, as Childress was handed a one-game suspension and a fine for unduly rough play and bringing the game into disrepute. The Wildcats' 2014–15 season ended with a fourth-place finish and a 2–0 semi-finals loss to the Cairns Taipans. For the season, Wagstaff averaged 8.5 points and 4.0 rebounds per game.

On 13 December 2015, Wagstaff played his 200th game for the Wildcats, becoming just the sixth player to play his first 200 NBL games with the Wildcats. In the game against the Sydney Kings, he hit all six of his 3-pointers in the final quarter to finish with a career-high 26 points in an 87–69 win. He went on to help the Wildcats qualify for the finals for the 30th straight year. They finished second with an 18–10 record and defeated the Illawarra Hawks 2–1 in the semi-finals. In the grand final series, the Wildcats defeated the New Zealand Breakers 2–1 to win the NBL championship. Wagstaff appeared in all 34 games for the Wildcats in 2015–16, averaging 9.3 points, 4.0 rebounds and 1.6 assists per game.

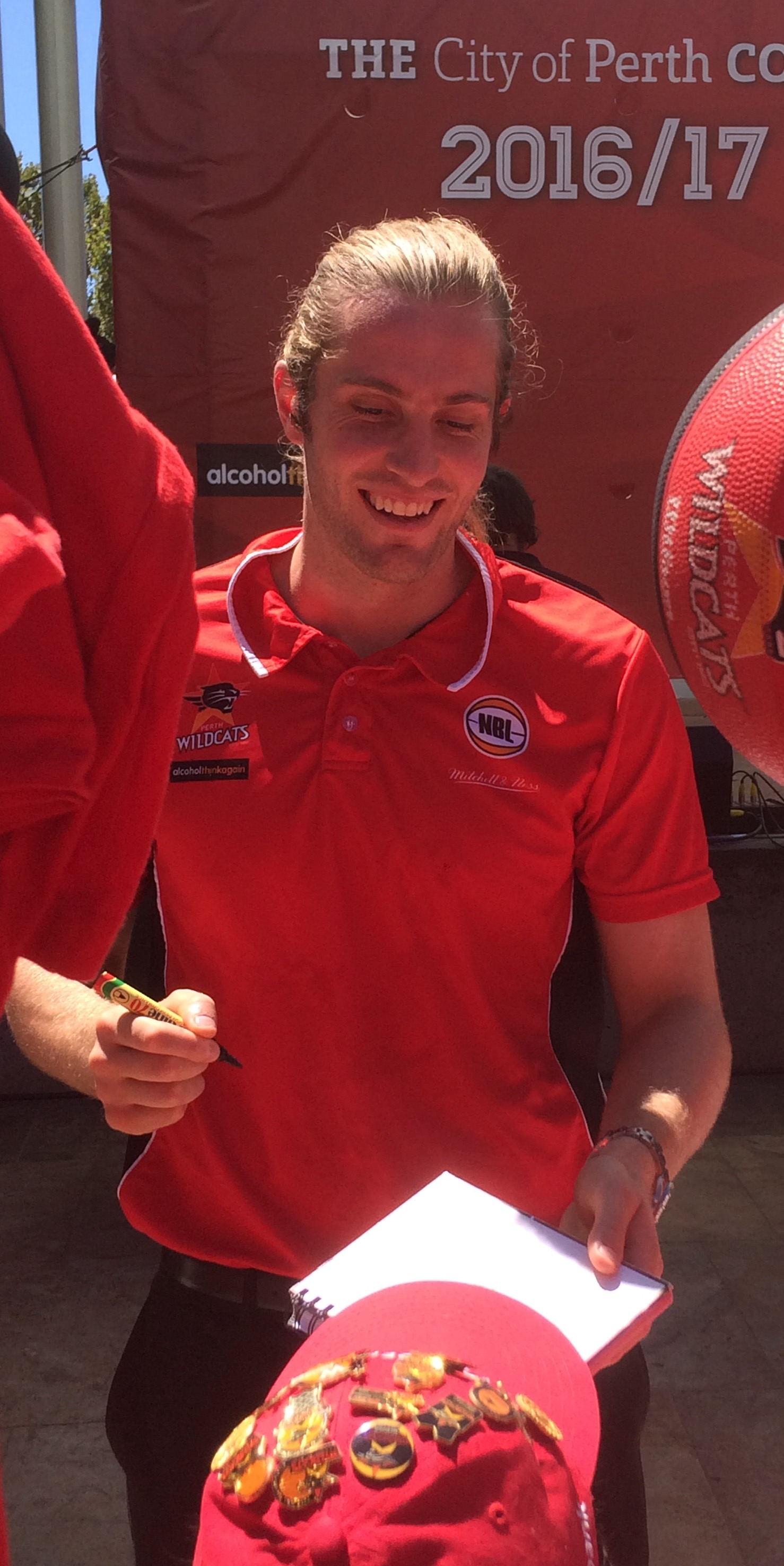
Wagstaff in March 2017, at the Wildcats' championship ceremony

On 19 April 2016, Wagstaff signed a two-year contract extension with the Wildcats, keeping him at the club until at least the end of the 2018–19 season. On 31 December 2016, he scored a season-high 20 points in a 95–87 win over the Illawarra Hawks. He shot 5-of-10 from the field and went 9-of-11 from the free throw line. The Wildcats finished the regular season in third place with a 15–13 record and played the Cairns Taipans in the semi-finals. In game two of the series, Wagstaff had an equal season-high 20 points including 5-of-11 from three-point range to help the Wildcats sweep the series 2–0. The Wildcats advanced to the NBL Grand Final for the sixth time in eight years. He went on to help the Wildcats to a 3–0 grand final series sweep of the Illawarra Hawks, as he claimed his fourth NBL championship. The Wildcats not only collected their eight NBL title but went back-to-back for the first time since 1990/1991. In the 95–86 title-clinching Game 3 win, Wagstaff came off the bench in his 250th game and scored 10 points. Wagstaff became the eighth Wildcat to play 250 games for the club, and the sixth to play his first 250 games for Perth. In addition, he and long-time teammate Shawn Redhage both played their 17th Grand Final game in Game 3, surpassing Ricky Grace's club record of 16. He appeared in all 33 games for the Wildcats in 2016–17, averaging 9.0 points, 2.8 rebounds and 1.2 assists per game.

On 1 December 2017, Wagstaff scored 19 points in 23 minutes off the bench in an 89–73 victory over the Breakers, helping the Wildcats win in New Zealand for the first time since 2013. He hit four 3-pointers midway through the fourth quarter. On 2 February 2018, he scored an equal game-high 25 points on 9-of-13 shooting and 3-of-6 from 3-point range in a 111–90 win over the Adelaide 36ers. The Wildcats finished the regular season in third place with a 16–12 record before losing in straight sets to the 36ers in the semi-finals. In 29 games in 2017–18, he averaged 9.2 points, 3.2 rebounds and 1.3 assists per game.

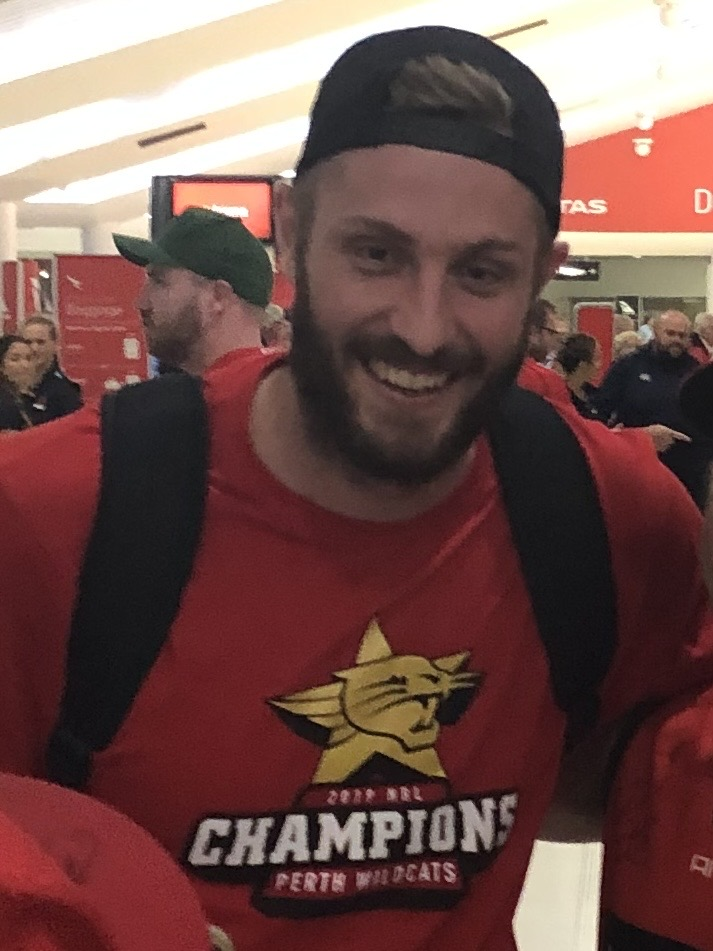
Wagstaff in March 2019, at Perth Airport following the Wildcats' championship win

Wagstaff helped the Wildcats start the 2018–19 season with a 10–1 record, before losing seven of their next nine games. In January 2019, he played his 300th game for the Wildcats. The Wildcats finished the regular season as minor premiers with an 18–10 record. In March 2019, he won his fifth NBL championship after the Wildcats defeated Melbourne United 3–1 in the grand final series. Wagstaff and long-time teammate Damian Martin became the first players in NBL history to win five championships with just one club. In 34 games, he averaged 5.6 points and 2.2 rebounds per game.

On 5 April 2019, Wagstaff re-signed with the Wildcats on a two-year deal. In February 2020, he passed Mike Ellis (370) for fourth place on the Wildcats' all-time 3-pointers list. In March 2020, he was crowned an NBL champion for the sixth time, becoming one of just four players in NBL history to win six titles, with he and teammate Damian Martin the only to do it at one club.

With the retirement of long-time captain and teammate Damian Martin, Wagstaff was named captain of the Wildcats for the 2020–21 NBL season. In February 2021, he became just the fourth Wildcat to reach 350 NBL games. On 1 May 2021, against the New Zealand Breakers, he played his 372nd game for the Wildcats, passing James Crawford (371) to move into third spot on the team's all-time games played list, placing him behind only Ricky Grace (482) and Shawn Redhage (380). On 1 June 2021, against the Illawarra Hawks, he passed Redhage with his 381st game. He went on to help the Wildcats reach the grand final, where he attempted to become the league's first ever seven-time championship winner and became the first player to take part in nine grand final series. During the grand final series, he passed Anthony Stewart (419) for second place on the Wildcats' all-time 3-pointers list. They lost the series 3–0 to Melbourne.

On 5 July 2021, Wagstaff re-signed with the Wildcats for the 2021–22 NBL season. On 17 December 2021, he scored 19 points in an 83–70 win over the Brisbane Bullets. It was his first 19-point game since February 2018. In February 2022, he became just the second player in Wildcats history to reach 400 games. After ending the regular season going 3–6 over the last nine games, the Wildcats finished fifth with a 16–12 record, thus ending the club's 35-year finals appearance streak and marking Wagstaff's first career playoff miss.

On 11 June 2022, Wagstaff re-signed with the Wildcats for the 2022–23 NBL season. He scored a season-high 14 points in the season opener against the Brisbane Bullets. The Wildcats returned to the finals but lost in the play-in game.

On 2 June 2023, Wagstaff re-signed with the Wildcats for the 2023–24 NBL season. In October 2023, he played his 450th NBL game. He averaged 6.5 points, 3.0 rebounds and 1.1 assists per game, including 7.4 points per game from December onwards in helping the team reach the semi-finals.

On 11 April 2024, Wagstaff re-signed with the Wildcats for the 2024–25 NBL season. On 1 November 2024, he played his 482nd game in a win over the Illawarra Hawks, tying the Wildcats' all-time games played record alongside Ricky Grace. He broke Grace's record two days later, playing his 483rd game in a loss to the South East Melbourne Phoenix. In December, he made his 500th career 3-pointer. He played his 500th NBL game on 2 February 2025 against the Kings in Sydney, becoming the 14th player in NBL history and just the fourth at a single club to play 500 games. He helped the Wildcats reach the semi-finals series, where they lost 2–1 to Melbourne United. In game three of the series, Wagstaff hit a 3-pointer with 2.9 seconds left that tied scores up before Melbourne prevailed on the last possession to hand the Wildcats a season-ending 113–112 loss. For the season, he averaged below 12 minutes a game for the first time in his career and finished averaging 4.2 points, 1.9 rebounds and 1.2 assists per game.

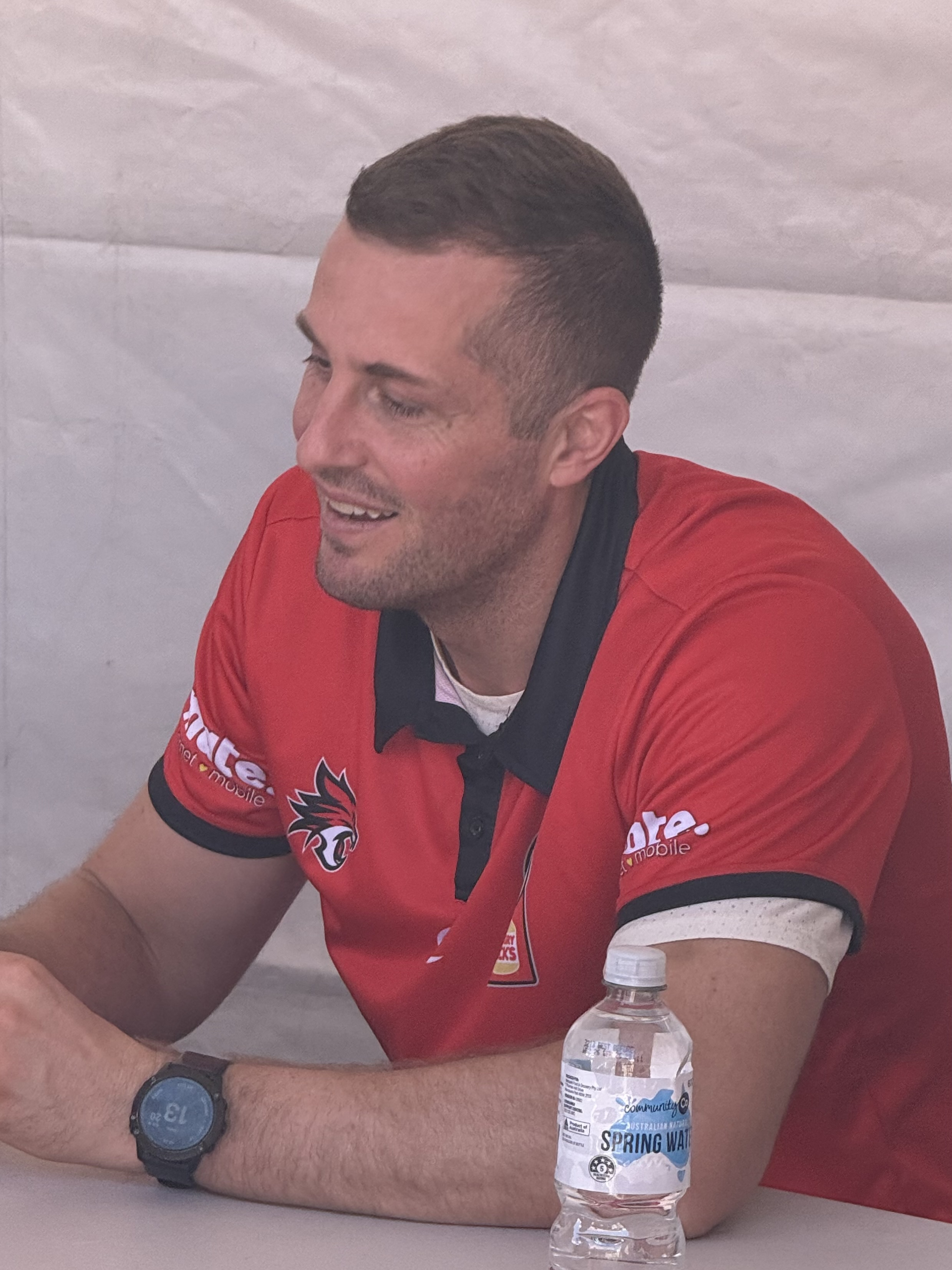
Wagstaff in February 2026, at the Wildcats' Fan Day

On 21 March 2025, Wagstaff re-signed with the Wildcats for the 2025–26 NBL season. Coming into his 17th season, he dropped 9 kilograms, going from 114 kg to 105 kg. In January 2026, he played in his 331st win for the Wildcats, surpassing Andrew Gaze (330) to become the winningest player with one club in NBL history. On 20 February 2026, in the Wildcats' regular-season finale, Wagstaff recorded 18 points and seven rebounds in an 86–74 win over the Adelaide 36ers. It marked his 536th game. In March 2026, in the Wildcats' play-in game against Melbourne United, Wagstaff moved into second place all-time in NBL games won by a player with his 338th career win, trailing only Tony Ronaldson (430).

On 21 April 2026, Wagstaff re-signed with the Wildcats for the 2026–27 NBL season. On 10 October 2026, he recorded 13 points, six assists and four rebounds in a 100–84 win over the New Zealand Breakers. In November 2026, he became just the sixth player to reach 550 NBL games, marking the second-most by an individual at a single club.

== National team career ==
In 2009, Wagstaff was a member of the Australian University National Team that travelled to Serbia to play in the World University Games. He averaged 18 points per game. He received a call-up to join the Australian Boomers in June 2010 ahead of their three-game series with Argentina. The following year, he played for the Boomers during the YouYi Games against China. In 2013, he played for the Boomers during the Sino-Australia Challenge against China.

In June 2017, Wagstaff was named in a 20-man Boomers squad ahead of the 2017 FIBA Asia Cup. In 2018, he played for the Boomers at the Commonwealth Games, winning a gold medal and averaging 8.8 points per game. He played for the Boomers again during the 2019 FIBA World Cup qualifiers.

In July 2022, Wagstaff played for the Australia men's national 3x3 team at the FIBA Asia 3x3 Cup in Singapore. He helped Australia win the gold medal and was named MVP of the tournament. He represented Australia in 3x3 at the 2022 Commonwealth Games in Birmingham, where the team won silver.

In June 2026, Wagstaff was selected for the Australian 3x3 team for the 2026 Commonwealth Games in Glasgow. The team went on to win the silver medal.

== Personal life ==
Wagstaff is the son of Derric and Barbara, and has a sister named Naomi. Wagstaff and his long-time girlfriend, Stephanie, got married in Denver in 2015. The couple have three children.

Wagstaff has a degree in Civil Engineering, a Masters in Business Administration, and a Masters in Traffic Engineering. In 2012 and 2013, he worked part-time at an engineering firm. In 2016, he started studying for a master's degree in Financial Planning. In October 2023, he was inducted into Curtin University's Vice-Chancellor's Elite Athlete Alumni.
