= China men's national 3x3 team =

National 3x3 basketball team

China
- FIBA ranking: 47
- FIBA zone: FIBA Asia
- National federation: CBA

Olympic Games
- Appearances: 2

3x3 World Cup
- Appearances: 6

3x3 Asia Cup
- Appearances: 8
- Medals: (silver) Silver (2025); (bronze) Bronze (2019, 2022, 2026)
Home	Away
Medal record
Men's 3x3 basketball
Representing China
Asian Games
Gold medal – first place	2018 Jakarta	Team
Asian Cup
Silver medal – second place	2025 Singapore	Team
Bronze medal – third place	2023 Singapore
Bronze medal – third place	2019 Changsha	Team

The China men's national 3x3 team represents the People's Republic of China in international 3x3 basketball competitions. It is governed by the Chinese Basketball Association.

== Competitive record ==
=== Olympic Games ===
Year	Position	Pld	W	L
(Japan) 2020 Tokyo	8th	7	2	5
(France) 2024 Paris	8th	7	1	6
Total	2/2	14	3	11

=== 3x3 World Cup ===
Year	Pos	Pld	W	L
(Greece) 2012	Did not enter			
(Russia) 2014	15th	6	2	4
(China) 2016	18th	5	0	5
(France) 2017	Did not enter			
(Philippines) 2018	Did not enter			
(Netherlands) 2019	19th	4	0	4
(Belgium) 2022	17th	4	1	3
(Austria) 2023	Did not enter			
(Mongolia) 2025	8th	5	3	2
(Poland) 2026	17th	4	1	3
(Singapore) 2027	To be determined			
Total	6/11	28	7	21

=== Asian Games ===
Year	Pos	Pld	W	L
(Indonesia) 2018	1st	7	7	0

=== 3x3 Asia Cup ===
- 2017 – 5th
- 2018 – 5th
- 2019 – 3rd
- 2022 – 3rd
- 2023 – 4th
- 2024 – 6th
- 2025 – 2nd
- 2026 – 3rd

=== Asian Indoor Games ===
- 2007 – (silver)

== See also ==
- China women's national 3x3 team
- China men's national basketball team
