= FIBA 3x3 Asia Cup =

Basketball tournament for national teams

- Current season, competition or edition: 2026 FIBA 3x3 Asia Cup
- Sport: 3x3 basketball
- Founded: 2013
- No. of teams: 12
- Country: FIBA Asia and FIBA Oceania members
- Continent: Asia and Oceania
- Most recent champions: M: New Zealand (1st title); W: Australia (6th title) (2026)
- Most titles: M: Australia (5 titles); W: Australia (6 titles)

The FIBA 3x3 Asia Cup is the top basketball tournament in Asia for 3x3 national teams and was first held in 2013 as the FIBA Asia 3x3 Championship in Doha, Qatar. In the championship, there are 2 events, men's and women's. Each team has 4 players (3 on court, 1 bench). The match is played on a half court and every rule applies as well as a 12-second shot clock and clearance needed on a new possession.

From 2019 to 2022, the tournament was held in Changsha, China.

== Men ==
=== Results ===
Year	Host	Final			Third place match		
Year	Host	Champion	Score	Second place	Third place	Score	Fourth place
2013; Details	(Qatar); Doha	Qatar	19–17	Saudi Arabia	Iran	19–8	Jordan
2017; Details	(Mongolia); Ulaanbaatar	Mongolia	19–14	New Zealand	Australia	21–18	Kazakhstan
2018; Details	(China); Shenzhen	Australia	17–16	Mongolia	Japan	21–20	New Zealand
2019; Details	(China); Changsha	Australia	21–9	Mongolia	China	14–11	Kazakhstan
2022; Details	Singapore	Australia	21–17	New Zealand	China	20–18	Philippines
2023; Details	Singapore	Mongolia	21–18	Australia	New Zealand	21–13	China
2024; Details	Singapore	Australia	21–7	Iran	Mongolia	21–18	New Zealand
2025; Details	Singapore	Australia	21–19	China	New Zealand	21–18	Japan
2026; Details	Singapore	New Zealand	21–15	South Korea	China	22–20	Japan
2027; Details	(Mongolia); Ulaanbaatar						

=== Medal table ===
Rank	Nation	Gold	Silver	Bronze	Total
1	Australia	5	1	1	7
2	Mongolia	2	2	1	5
3	New Zealand	1	2	2	5
4	Qatar	1	0	0	1
5	China	0	1	3	4
6	Iran	0	1	1	2
7	Saudi Arabia	0	1	0	1
7	South Korea	0	1	0	1
9	Japan	0	0	1	1
Totals (9 entries)		9	9	9	27

=== Participating nations ===
Nation	(Qatar) 2013	(Mongolia) 2017	(China) 2018	(China) 2019	(Singapore) 2022	(Singapore) 2023	(Singapore) 2024	(Singapore) 2025	(Singapore) 2026	(Mongolia) 2027	Overall
Australia		3rd	1st	1st	1st	2nd	1st	1st	7th		8
Bahrain		12th									1
China		5th	5th	3rd	3rd	4th	6th	2nd	3rd		8
Chinese Taipei	QF	6th	9th	8th	8th	9th		11th	11th		8
Guam			14th								1
Hong Kong	PR		17th					12th			3
India	QF	9th			9th	11th		6th	12th		6
Indonesia	PR		18th	10th							3
Iran	3rd		11th			5th	2nd	11th			5
Japan	PR	8th	3rd	7th	5th	12th	7th	4th	4th		9
Jordan	4th		7th	5th							3
Kazakhstan		4th	12th	4th		7th					4
Kyrgyzstan		7th									1
Lebanon	PR	14th									2
Malaysia		13th	19th				9th		9th		4
Mongolia	PR	1st	2nd	2nd	6th	1st	3rd	5th	5th	Q	10
Nepal	PR										1
New Zealand		2nd	4th	9th	2nd	3rd	4th	3rd	1st		8
Philippines	QF				4th	10th	11th		6th		5
Qatar	1st	10th	6th	6th	11th	6th	8th	8th	8th		9
South Korea			8th	11th	7th				2nd		4
Samoa			20th								1
Saudi Arabia	2nd										1
Singapore					10th	8th	10th	7th	10th		5
Sri Lanka	PR	11th	16th				12th				4
Thailand			15th				5th				2
Turkmenistan	PR	15th	10th	12th							4
Uzbekistan			13th		12th						2
Vietnam			21st					9th			2
Total	15	15	21	12	12	12	12	12	12	12	

== Women ==
=== Results ===
Year	Host	Final			Third place match		
Year	Host	Champion	Score	Second place	Third place	Score	Fourth place
2013; Details	(Qatar); Doha	India	21–14	Mongolia	Turkmenistan	10–8	Hong Kong
2017; Details	(Mongolia); Ulaanbaatar	Australia	21–15	Malaysia	China	21–16	India
2018; Details	(China); Shenzhen	New Zealand	14–11	China	Australia	17–5	Japan
2019; Details	(China); Changsha	Australia	20–9	Kazakhstan	Japan	21–14	Mongolia
2022; Details	Singapore	China	14–10	Australia	Indonesia	21–17	Japan
2023; Details	Singapore	Australia	21–11	New Zealand	China	11–9	Thailand
2024; Details	Singapore	Australia	18–13	New Zealand	Mongolia	17–10	Chinese Taipei
2025; Details	Singapore	Australia	21–17	Japan	China	21–11	Philippines
2026; Details	Singapore	Australia	18–9	Philippines	China	22–20	Japan
2027; Details	(Mongolia); Ulaanbaatar						

=== Medal table ===
Rank	Nation	Gold	Silver	Bronze	Total
1	Australia	6	1	1	8
2	New Zealand	1	2	0	3
3	China	1	1	4	6
4	India	1	0	0	1
5	Japan	0	1	1	2
5	Mongolia	0	1	1	2
7	Kazakhstan	0	1	0	1
7	Malaysia	0	1	0	1
7	Philippines	0	1	0	1
10	Indonesia	0	0	1	1
10	Turkmenistan	0	0	1	1
Totals (11 entries)		9	9	9	27

=== Participating nations ===
Nation	(Qatar) 2013	(Mongolia) 2017	(China) 2018	(China) 2019	(Singapore) 2022	(Singapore) 2023	(Singapore) 2024	(Singapore) 2025	(Singapore) 2026	(Mongolia) 2027	Overall
Australia		1st	3rd	1st	2nd	1st	1st	1st	1st		8
China		3rd	2nd	10th	1st	3rd	7th	3rd	3rd		8
Chinese Taipei		9th	8th		5th	8th	4th	9th	9th		7
Hong Kong	4th										1
India	1st	4th				11th	11th				4
Indonesia	PR		7th		3rd			12th			4
Iran			11th	9th		9th	9th	13th			5
Japan			4th	3rd	4th	5th	5th	2nd	4th		7
Jordan			9th								1
Kazakhstan		8th	5th	2nd					10th		4
Kyrgyzstan		10th		12th							2
Lebanon	QF										1
Malaysia		2nd	12th			12th	12th		12th		5
Mongolia	2nd	5th			6th	6th	3rd	5th	5th	Q	8
Nepal	QF										1
New Zealand		6th	1st	7th	10th	2nd	2nd	10th	8th		8
Philippines				8th		7th	6th	4th	2nd		5
Qatar	QF	12th									2
Singapore					12th	10th	10th	11th	7th		5
South Korea								8th			1
Sri Lanka	QF	11th		11th	8th						4
Thailand				6th	7th	4th	8th	7th	6th		6
Tonga									11th		1
Turkmenistan	3rd	7th	10th	5th	11th						5
Uzbekistan			6th		9th						2
Vietnam								6th			1
Total	9	12	12	12	12	12	12	12	12	12	

== Overall medal table ==
Rank	Nation	Gold	Silver	Bronze	Total
1	Australia	11	2	2	15
2	New Zealand	2	4	2	8
3	Mongolia	2	3	2	7
4	China	1	2	7	10
5	India	1	0	0	1
5	Qatar	1	0	0	1
7	Japan	0	1	2	3
8	Iran	0	1	1	2
9	Kazakhstan	0	1	0	1
9	Malaysia	0	1	0	1
9	Philippines	0	1	0	1
9	Saudi Arabia	0	1	0	1
9	South Korea	0	1	0	1
14	Indonesia	0	0	1	1
14	Turkmenistan	0	0	1	1
Totals (15 entries)		18	18	18	54

== See also ==
- FIBA 3x3 U18 Asia Cup
- FIBA Asia Cup
- FIBA Women's Asia Cup
