= Southern Vales Christian College =

Location
- Adelaide, South Australia; Australia; 35°06′45.1″S 138°32′8.6″E

Information
- Type: Independent, Christian, co-educational
- Denomination: Pentecostal
- Established: 1980 (Morphett Vale campus); 1991 (Aldinga campus)
- Chairman: Pastor Martyn Manuel
- Principal: Adam Dunt
- Campus: Morphett Vale; Aldinga
- Website: www.svcc.sa.edu.au

Southern Vales Christian College is a Christian school located across two campuses in South Australia. It is a ministry of Harvest Church. The original campus is located in Morphett Vale with a second campus opened in Aldinga.

Southern Vales Christian College first opened in September 1980 as Morphett Vale Christian Community School operating as a ministry of the Morphett Vale Baptist Church (today known as Harvest Church). A second campus in Aldinga was opened in early 1991. Both campuses are promoted as having extensive experience with special needs students.

== Controversy ==
On 27 August 2021, Nine News Adelaide reported that Southern Vales Christian College has a policy against hiring homosexual teachers. While the college defended the policy based on Australia's religious discrimination laws, South Australian Premier Steven Marshall said, "South Australia has always been a diverse, accepting, respectful state and we don’t want to have discrimination here in our state."
