= Jarred Bairstow =

Australian basketball player (born 1992)

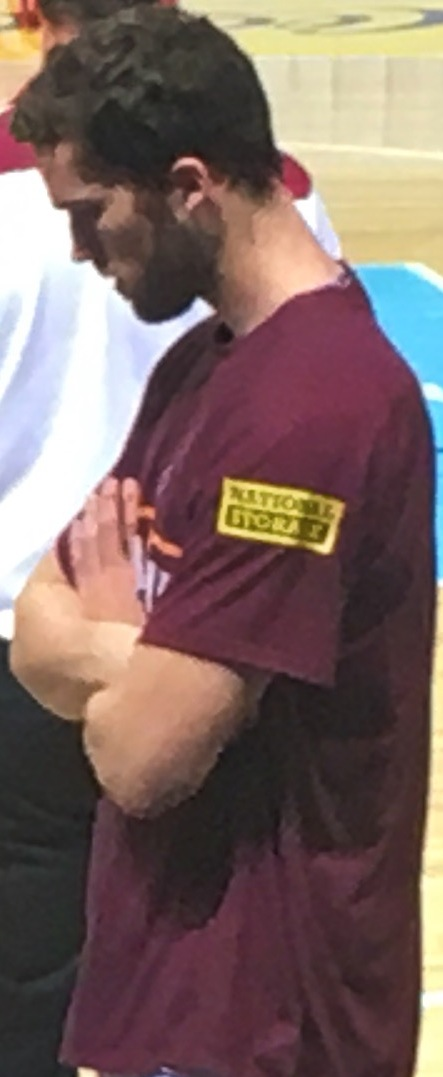
- Bairstow with the Brisbane Bullets in 2016

No. 21 – Brisbane Capitals
- Position: Power forward
- League: NBL1 North

Personal information
- Born: 5 November 1992 (age 34) Brisbane, Queensland, Australia
- Listed height: 201 cm (6 ft 7 in)
- Listed weight: 101 kg (223 lb)

Career information
- High school: Anglican Church Grammar School (Brisbane, Queensland)
- College: Central Oklahoma (2013–2016)
- Playing career: 2010–present

Career history
- 2010–2012: Brisbane Capitals
- 2015–2019: South West Metro Pirates
- 2016–2017: Brisbane Bullets
- 2020: Brisbane Capitals
- 2020–2021: Perth Wildcats
- 2021: Sunshine Coast Phoenix
- 2021–2024: Tasmania JackJumpers
- 2022–2023: Hobart Chargers
- 2024: Southern Districts Spartans
- 2024–2025: Brisbane Bullets
- 2025: South West Metro Pirates
- 2026–present: Brisbane Capitals

Career highlights
- NBL champion (2024); NBL1 South champion (2022); NBL Cup winner (2021); QSL champion (2020); NBL1 North All Star Five First Team (2026)
Medals
Representing Australia
Men's basketball
FIBA Asia Cup
Gold medal – first place	2022 Jakarta
Men's 3x3 basketball
Commonwealth Games
Silver medal – second place	2026 Glasgow	Team

Jarred Bairstow (born 5 November 1992) is an Australian professional basketball player for the Brisbane Capitals of the NBL1 North. He played three seasons of college basketball in the United States for the Central Oklahoma Bronchos before returning to Australia and spending the 2016–17 season as a development player with his hometown Brisbane Bullets in the National Basketball League (NBL). Between 2020 and 2024, he played one season with the Perth Wildcats and three seasons with the Tasmania JackJumpers. He returned to the Bullets in 2024.

== Early life ==
Bairstow was born Brisbane, Queensland. He attended Brisbane's Anglican Church Grammar School and grew up supporting the Brisbane Bullets in the NBL. Between 2010 and 2012, he played in the Queensland Basketball League (QBL) for the Brisbane Capitals. He was named the team's MVP for the 2012 season.

== College career ==
In 2013, Bairstow moved to the United States to play college basketball for the Central Oklahoma Bronchos in the NCAA Division II. In his first season, he averaged 6.8 points and 5.4 rebounds in 11 games with nine starts. In the 2014–15 season, he averaged 4.9 points and 3.1 rebounds while playing in all 30 games with seven starts. In the 2015–16 season, he averaged 8.9 points and 4.5 rebounds in 30 games with 24 starts. He scored a career-high 24 points on 1 March 2016 against Central Missouri.

== Professional career ==
After playing for the South West Metro Pirates in the QBL in 2015 and 2016, Bairstow joined the Brisbane Bullets as a development player for the 2016–17 NBL season. He played four games for the Bullets during the season. His brother Cameron Bairstow was his teammate.

Bairstow played three more seasons for the South West Metro Pirates in the QBL between 2017 and 2019. He returned to the Brisbane Capitals in 2020 and helped them win the Queensland State League (QSL).

On 9 December 2020, Bairstow signed with the Perth Wildcats for the 2020–21 NBL season as an injury replacement for Majok Majok. He was deactivated from the roster on 6 May 2021 following the Wildcats' signing of Will Magnay, but returned to the active roster later that month following a season-ending injury to Bryce Cotton. He played 38 games, starting in 17, and averaged 1.9 points, 2.7 rebounds and 0.9 assists per game.

In June 2021, Bairstow joined the Sunshine Coast Phoenix of the NBL1 North for the rest of the 2021 NBL1 season.

On 7 July 2021, Bairstow signed a three-year contract with the Tasmania JackJumpers, a team entering the NBL for the first time in 2021–22. After playing for the Hobart Chargers of the NBL1 South during the 2022 NBL1 season, he returned to the JackJumpers for the 2022–23 NBL season. He re-joined the Chargers for the 2023 NBL1 South season. In the 2023–24 NBL season, he was a member of the JackJumpers' championship-winning team. He parted ways with the JackJumpers in April 2024.

After initially signing with the North Gold Coast Seahawks, Bairstow instead joined the Southern Districts Spartans for the 2024 NBL1 North season.

On 12 July 2024, Bairstow signed with the Brisbane Bullets for the 2024–25 NBL season, returning to the team for a second stint. He was sidelined mid season with an ankle injury sustained in round eight, requiring ankle surgery.

Bairstow joined the South West Metro Pirates for the 2025 NBL1 North season.

Bairstow joined the Brisbane Capitals for the 2026 NBL1 North season. On 2 May 2026, he had 26 points, 11 rebounds and 13 assists against the Southern Districts Spartans. He was named to the NBL1 North All Star Five First Team.

== National team ==
In June 2026, Bairstow joined the Australia men's national 3x3 team for the 2026 FIBA 3x3 World Cup. Later that month, he was selected for the Australian 3x3 team for the 2026 Commonwealth Games in Glasgow. The team went on to win the silver medal.

== Personal life ==
Bairstow has six siblings. His older brother is former NBA player Cameron Bairstow. His sister Stephanie Bairstow is a former WNBL player. He has also played with and against brothers Kieran and Sean.

Off the court, Bairstow is a medical engineer.
