= 2027 FIBA 3x3 Asia Cup – Men's tournament =

Tournament details
- Host country: Mongolia
- City: Ulaanbaatar
- Dates: 31 March – 4 April

The 2027 FIBA 3x3 Asia Cup will be the tenth edition of this continental championship. The event will be held in Ulaanbaatar, Mongolia from 31 March to 4 April 2027.

== Venue ==
The venue will be at the Sükhbaatar Square.

2027 FIBA 3x3 Asia Cup – Men's tournament is located in Mongolia	Ulaanbaatar
2027 FIBA 3x3 Asia Cup – Men's tournament is located in Mongolia	Sükhbaatar Square
