= 2025 FIBA 3x3 Asia Cup – Men's tournament =

2025 FIBA 3x3 World Cup
Tournament details
- Host country: Singapore
- City: Singapore
- Dates: 26–30 March
- Teams: 25

Final positions
- Champions: Australia (5th title)
- Runners-up: China
- Third place: New Zealand
- Fourth place: Japan

Tournament statistics
- MVP: (Australia) Dillon Stith

The 2025 FIBA 3x3 Asia Cup – Men's tournament was the eighth edition of the continental championship. The event was held in Singapore from 26 to 30 March 2025.

Australia won their fifth title with a win over China.

== Host selection ==
Singapore was given the hosting rights on 3 October 2022 after they signed a three-year contract to host the 2023, 2024 and 2025 editions of the tournament.

== Participating teams ==
All National Federations in the Asia and Oceania region were invited to register a team for the 2024 FIBA 3x3 Asia Cup.

Preliminary round

Pool A

- Mongolia (1)
- Singapore (H) (8)
- Qualifier Pool A

Pool B

- China (2)
- Chinese Taipei (7)
- Qualifier Pool B

Pool C

- Japan (3)
- Australia (6)
- Qualifier Pool C

Pool D

- New Zealand (4)
- Qatar (5)
- Qualifier Pool D

Qualifying draw

Pool A

- Malaysia (9)
- Indonesia (16)
- Hong Kong (17)
- Bahrain (24)
- Guam (25)

Pool B

- Philippines (10)
- South Korea (15)
- India (18)
- Macau (23)

Pool C

- Kazakhstan (11)
- Iran (14)
- Maldives (19)
- Papua New Guinea (22)

Pool D

- Thailand (12)
- Turkmenistan (13)
- Vietnam (20)
- New Caledonia (21)

== Venue ==
The venue was at the OCBC Square, Singapore Sports Hub.

| 2025 FIBA 3x3 Asia Cup – Men's tournament is located in Singapore | Singapore |
|---|---|
| 2025 FIBA 3x3 Asia Cup – Men's tournament is located in Singapore | OCBC Square, Singapore Sports Hub |

== Medalists ==
| Event | Gold | Silver | Bronze |
|---|---|---|---|
| Men's team | Australia; Jonah Antonio; Lachlan Barker; Alex Higgins-Titsha; Dillon Stith | China; Guo Hanyu; Xiang Zhichao; Yan Peng; Zhang Dianliang | New Zealand; Zach Hannen; Te Tuhi Lewis; Christian Martin; Aidan Tonge |

== Qualifying draw ==
The four group winners qualified for the next round.

=== Pool Qualifying Draw A ===
| Pos | Team | Pld | W | L | PF | PA | PD | Qualification | (Hong Kong) | (Bahrain) | (Guam) | (Malaysia) | (Indonesia) |
|---|---|---|---|---|---|---|---|---|---|---|---|---|---|
| 1 | Hong Kong | 4 | 3 | 1 | 80 | 55 | +25 | Preliminary round | | 21–7 | | 21–13 | |
| 2 | Bahrain | 4 | 3 | 1 | 62 | 71 | −9 | | | | 21–20 | | 14–11 |
| 3 | Guam | 4 | 2 | 2 | 78 | 69 | +9 | | 16–20 | | | 21–12 | |
| 4 | Malaysia | 4 | 1 | 3 | 61 | 77 | −16 | | | 19–20 | | | 17–15 |
| 5 | Indonesia | 4 | 1 | 3 | 61 | 70 | −9 | | 19–18 | | 16–21 | | |

Source: FIBA
Rules for classification: 1) Wins; 2) Head-to-head record; 3) Points scored.

=== Pool Qualifying Draw B ===
| Pos | Team | Pld | W | L | PF | PA | PD | Qualification | (India) | (Philippines) | (South Korea) | (Macau) |
|---|---|---|---|---|---|---|---|---|---|---|---|---|
| 1 | India | 3 | 3 | 0 | 63 | 28 | +35 | Preliminary round | | 21–11 | | |
| 2 | Philippines | 3 | 2 | 1 | 49 | 48 | +1 | | | | 17–15 | 21–23 |
| 3 | South Korea | 3 | 1 | 2 | 47 | 45 | +2 | | 11–21 | | | 21–7 |
| 4 | Macau | 3 | 0 | 3 | 25 | 63 | −38 | | 6–21 | | | |

Source: FIBA
Rules for classification: 1) Wins; 2) Head-to-head record; 3) Points scored.

=== Pool Qualifying Draw C ===
| Pos | Team | Pld | W | L | PF | PA | PD | Qualification | (Iran) | (Kazakhstan) | (Papua New Guinea) | (Maldives) |
|---|---|---|---|---|---|---|---|---|---|---|---|---|
| 1 | Iran | 3 | 3 | 0 | 63 | 23 | +40 | Preliminary round | | | 21–8 | 21–9 |
| 2 | Kazakhstan | 3 | 2 | 1 | 45 | 53 | −8 | | 6–21 | | 18–16 | |
| 3 | Papua New Guinea | 3 | 1 | 2 | 40 | 49 | −9 | | | | | 16–10 |
| 4 | Maldives | 3 | 0 | 3 | 35 | 58 | −23 | | | 21–16 | | |

Source: FIBA
Rules for classification: 1) Wins; 2) Head-to-head record; 3) Points scored.

=== Pool Qualifying Draw D ===
| Pos | Team | Pld | W | L | PF | PA | PD | Qualification | (Vietnam) | (Thailand) | (Turkmenistan) | (New Caledonia) |
|---|---|---|---|---|---|---|---|---|---|---|---|---|
| 1 | Vietnam | 3 | 2 | 1 | 58 | 43 | +15 | Preliminary round | | 21–15 | | |
| 2 | Thailand | 3 | 2 | 1 | 57 | 49 | +8 | | | | 21–15 | 21–13 |
| 3 | Turkmenistan | 3 | 2 | 1 | 49 | 51 | −2 | | 17–16 | | | 17–14 |
| 4 | New Caledonia | 3 | 0 | 3 | 38 | 59 | −21 | | 11–21 | | | |

Source: FIBA
Rules for classification: 1) Wins; 2) Head-to-head record; 3) Points scored.

== Preliminary round ==
The pools were announced on 20 February 2025.

=== Pool A ===
| Pos | Team | Pld | W | L | PF | PA | PD | Qualification | (Mongolia) | (Singapore) | (Hong Kong) |
|---|---|---|---|---|---|---|---|---|---|---|---|
| 1 | Mongolia | 2 | 2 | 0 | 42 | 18 | +24 | Knockout stage | | 22–10 | 22–8 |
| 2 | Singapore (H) | 2 | 1 | 1 | 31 | 37 | −6 | Knockout stage | | | 21–16 |
| 3 | Hong Kong | 2 | 0 | 2 | 24 | 42 | −18 | | | | |

Source: FIBA
Rules for classification: 1) Wins; 2) Head-to-head record; 3) Points scored.
(H) Hosts

=== Pool B ===
| Pos | Team | Pld | W | L | PF | PA | PD | Qualification | (China) | (India) | (Chinese Taipei) |
|---|---|---|---|---|---|---|---|---|---|---|---|
| 1 | China | 2 | 2 | 0 | 42 | 29 | +13 | Knockout stage | | 21–19 | 21–10 |
| 2 | India | 2 | 1 | 1 | 40 | 39 | +1 | Knockout stage | | | |
| 3 | Chinese Taipei | 2 | 0 | 2 | 28 | 42 | −14 | | | 18–21 | |

Source: FIBA
Rules for classification: 1) Wins; 2) Head-to-head record; 3) Points scored.

=== Pool C ===
| Pos | Team | Pld | W | L | PF | PA | PD | Qualification | (Japan) | (Australia) | (Iran) |
|---|---|---|---|---|---|---|---|---|---|---|---|
| 1 | Japan | 2 | 2 | 0 | 42 | 33 | +9 | Knockout stage | | 21–16 | 21–17 |
| 2 | Australia | 2 | 1 | 1 | 34 | 32 | +2 | Knockout stage | | | 18–11 |
| 3 | Iran | 2 | 0 | 2 | 28 | 39 | −11 | | | | |

Source: FIBA
Rules for classification: 1) Wins; 2) Head-to-head record; 3) Points scored.

=== Pool D ===
| Pos | Team | Pld | W | L | PF | PA | PD | Qualification | (New Zealand) | (Qatar) | (Vietnam) |
|---|---|---|---|---|---|---|---|---|---|---|---|
| 1 | New Zealand | 2 | 2 | 0 | 38 | 30 | +8 | Knockout stage | | 17–15 | 21–15 |
| 2 | Qatar | 2 | 1 | 1 | 36 | 33 | +3 | Knockout stage | | | 21–16 |
| 3 | Vietnam | 2 | 0 | 2 | 31 | 42 | −11 | | | | |

Source: FIBA
Rules for classification: 1) Wins; 2) Head-to-head record; 3) Points scored.

== Knockout stage ==
Quarter-finals
30 March
Mongolia | 7
Australia | 21
30 March
New Zealand | 21
India | 11
30 March
China | 19
Qatar | 11
30 March
Japan | 21
Singapore | 17

Semi-finals
30 March
Australia | 21
New Zealand | 19
30 March
China | 19
Japan | 15

Final
30 March
Australia | 21
China | 19
Third place
30 March
New Zealand | 21
Japan | 18

== Final ranking ==
| Rank | Team | Record |
|---|---|---|
| 1st place, gold medalist(s) | Australia | 4–1 |
| 2nd place, silver medalist(s) | China | 4–1 |
| 3rd place, bronze medalist(s) | New Zealand | 4–1 |
| 4 | Japan | 3–2 |
| 5 | Mongolia | 2–1 |
| 6 | India | 1–2 |
| 7 | Singapore | 1–2 |
| 8 | Qatar | 1–2 |
| 9 | Vietnam | 0–2 |
| 10 | Iran | 0–2 |
| 11 | Chinese Taipei | 0–2 |
| 12 | Hong Kong | 0–2 |
Eliminated in Qualifying draw
| 13 | Bahrain | 3–1 |
| 14 | Thailand | 2–1 |
| 15 | Philippines | 2–1 |
| 16 | Turkmenistan | 2–1 |
| 17 | Kazakhstan | 2–1 |
| 18 | Guam | 2–2 |
| 19 | South Korea | 1–2 |
| 20 | Papua New Guinea | 1–2 |
| 21 | Malaysia | 1–3 |
| 22 | Indonesia | 1–3 |
| 23 | New Caledonia | 0–3 |
| 24 | Maldives | 0–3 |
| 25 | Macau | 0–3 |

== Statistics and awards ==
=== Points leaders ===
| Rank | Name | Points |
|---|---|---|
| 1 | (Japan) Ryo Ozawa | 51 |
| 2 | (New Zealand) TeTuhi Lewis | 44 |
| 3 | (China) Guo Hanyu | 35 |
| 4 | (Australia) Alex Higgins-Titsha | 31 |
| 4 | (Australia) Dillon Stith | 31 |

=== Awards ===
The awards were announced on 30 March 2025.

All-Star team
(Australia) Dillon Stith
(New Zealand) Te Tuhi Lewis
(Japan) Ryo Ozawa
MVP
(Australia) Dillon Stith
