= Alex Higgins-Titsha =

Australian basketball player (born 2000)

No. 27 – Perth Wildcats
- Position: Forward
- League: NBL

Personal information
- Born: 12 July 2000 (age 26) Sydney, New South Wales, Australia
- Listed height: 201 cm (6 ft 7 in)
- Listed weight: 81 kg (179 lb)

Career information
- High school: Waverley College (Sydney, New South Wales)
- NBA draft: 2022: undrafted
- Playing career: 2022–present

Career history
- 2022–2024: Inner West Bulls
- 2023: Bangui Sporting Club
- 2024–2026: Cairns Taipans
- 2025: Cairns Marlins
- 2026: Bankstown Bruins
- 2026–present: Perth Wildcats

Career highlights
- NBL1 East All-Star Five (2024); NBL1 East Defensive Player of the Year (2023)
Medals
Men's 3x3 basketball
Representing Australia
Asia Cup
Gold medal – first place	2025 Singapore	Team
Champions Cup
Bronze medal – third place	2025 Thailand	Team

Alexander Higgins-Titsha (born 12 July 2000) is an Australian professional basketball player for the Perth Wildcats of the National Basketball League (NBL).

== Early life and career ==
Higgins-Titsha was born in Sydney, New South Wales, and attended Waverley College. He is of Zimbabwean descent. Higgins-Titsha grew up as a fan of rugby league and soccer; he did not start playing basketball until he was aged 12.

Going on to study at the University of Technology Sydney (UTS), Higgins-Titsha went on to compete in the UniSport University Basketball League (UBL) and in the 3x3 Big Hustle Uni Nationals. Reaching the UBL Grand Final in 2021 before it was cancelled due to the COVID-19 pandemic, he continued with the program in 2022 where he reached a high of 34 points and 21 rebounds before falling in the Grand Final. Once more reaching the Grand Final after averaging over 18.9 points and 11.4 rebounds across the season, UTS fell to the University of Melbourne however Higgins-Titsha was named as the league's MVP.

In the 3x3 basketball realm, Higgins-Titsha suited up for UTS at the UniSport Nationals from 2021 to 2023. Going undefeated across his first tournament, he claimed gold at the event before returning to the Grand Final the following year where the side fell to Macquarie University. Returning in the final year of his studies, the side reached the quarter-finals where they fell to the Western Sydney University, before forfeiting their remaining games.

== Professional career ==
On 22 March 2022, Higgins-Titsha signed with the Inner West Bulls of the NBL1 East division. Going on to average 11 points, 6.5 rebounds, 2 steals and a block per game across his debut season, he re-signed with the club on 31 January 2023.

Increasing his average to 16.7 points, 8.7 rebounds, 2.4 steals and 1.3 blocks per game, Higgins-Titsha was named NBL1 East Defensive Player of the Year and helped the Bulls end the regular season ranked second, however the side fell in the first round of the playoffs.

On 8 October 2023, Higgins-Titsha signed with the Bangui Sporting Club of the Road to BAL. Appearing in eight games for the club, he averaged 10.4 points and 5.6 rebounds per game.

On 24 December 2023, Higgins-Titsha re-signed with the Inner West Bulls for the 2024 season and reached highs of 32 points and 17 rebounds across the season before once more falling in the first round of the playoffs. He was named to the NBL1 East All-Star Five.

On 11 July 2024, Higgins-Titsha signed with the Cairns Taipans of the National Basketball League (NBL) as a development player for the 2024–25 NBL season. After debuting with four points, four rebounds and four blocks in five minutes, he started his third professional game and finished with an 11 point and 11 rebound double-double. Going on to average 6.2 points, 3.9 rebounds and 0.9 blocks across 18 appearances, he was awarded the Taipans' Coaches Award.

On 25 March 2025, the Taipans exercised their club option on the second year of his contract, seeing him remain with the club for the 2025–26 NBL season. During the off-season, he spent time with the Cairns Marlins of the NBL1 North in the 2025 NBL1 season and played for the Golden State Warriors during the 2025 NBA Summer League.

After a strong start to the 2025–26 NBL season, averaging 6.2 points in nine games and recording a career-high 16 point performance, Higgins-Titsha was ruled out for the rest of the season due to a wrist injury on 29 October 2025.

He joined the Bankstown Bruins of the NBL1 East for the 2026 season.

On 5 June 2026, Higgins-Titsha signed with the Perth Wildcats a three-year deal, with a team option on the third year.

== National team career ==
In 2025 Higgins-Titsha played for the Australian Gangurrus at the FIBA 3x3 Champions Cup in Bangkok, where he won a bronze medal and was named in the Team of the Tournament. He also competed at the 2025 FIBA 3x3 Asia Cup in Singapore. In June 2025, he was named in the Australia 3x3 team for the 2025 FIBA 3x3 World Cup in Mongolia.

In March 2026, Higgins-Titsha was named in the Australia 3x3 team for the 2026 FIBA 3x3 Champions Cup. In June 2026, he played for the Gangurrus at the FIBA 3x3 World Cup.
