= South Korea men's national 3x3 team =

National 3x3 basketball team

South Korea
- FIBA zone: FIBA Asia
- National federation: Korea Basketball Association

3x3 Asia Cup
- Appearances: 4
- Medals: (silver) (2026)

The South Korea men's national 3x3 team is the 3x3 basketball team representing South Korea in international men's competitions.

The team won the silver medal in the men's tournament at the 2018 Asian Games held in Jakarta, Indonesia.

The team competed at the 2021 FIBA 3x3 Olympic Qualifying Tournament hoping to qualify for the 2020 Summer Olympics in Tokyo, Japan.

== Asia Cup record ==
- 2018 – 8th
- 2019 – 11th
- 2022 – 7th
- 2026 – 2nd
