= Chinese Taipei men's national 3x3 team =

Chinese Taipei
- FIBA ranking: 29
- FIBA zone: FIBA Asia
- National federation: CTBA

World Cup
- Appearances: 1

Asian Cup
- Appearances: 8

Taiwan, officially the Republic of China (ROC), competes as "Chinese Taipei" (TPE) at international 3x3 (3 against 3) basketball competitions, administered by the Chinese Taipei Basketball Association.

== Tournament records ==
=== World Cup ===
| Year | Position | Pld | W | L |
|---|---|---|---|---|
| (Greece) 2012 Athens | Did not qualify | | | |
| (Russia) 2014 Moscow | Did not qualify | | | |
| (China) 2016 Guangzhou | Did not qualify | | | |
| (France) 2017 Nantes | Did not qualify | | | |
| (Philippines) 2018 Bocaue | Did not qualify | | | |
| (Netherlands) 2019 Amsterdam | Did not qualify | | | |
| (Belgium) 2022 Antwerp | 20th | 4 | 0 | 4 |
| (Austria) 2023 Vienna | Did not qualify | | | |
| (Mongolia) 2025 Ulaanbaatar | Did not qualify | | | |
| (Austria) 2026 Warsaw | Did not qualify | | | |
| 2027 Singapore | To be determined | | | |
| Total | 1/11 | 4 | 0 | 4 |

=== Asian Games ===
| Year | Pos | Pld | W | L |
|---|---|---|---|---|
| (Indonesia) 2018 Jakarta | 7th | 5 | 3 | 2 |
| (China) 2022 Hangzhou | 1st | 8 | 7 | 1 |

=== 3x3 Asia Cup ===
- 2013 – Quarterfinals
- 2017 – 6th
- 2018 – 9th
- 2019 – 8th
- 2022 – 8th
- 2023 – 9th
- 2025 – 11th
- 2026 – 11th

=== Asian Indoor and Martial Arts Games ===
- 2007 (Macau) – 5th
- 2017 (Turkmenistan) – 9th

== See also ==
- Chinese Taipei national basketball team
- Chinese Taipei women's national 3x3 team
