= 2026 FIBA 3x3 Asia Cup – Men's tournament =

2026 FIBA 3x3 Asia Cup

Tournament details
- Host country: Singapore
- City: Singapore
- Dates: 1–5 April
- Teams: 22

Final positions
- Champions: New Zealand (1st title)
- Runners-up: South Korea
- Third place: China

Tournament statistics
- MVP: (New Zealand) Te Tuhi Lewis

The 2026 FIBA 3x3 Asia Cup – Men's tournament was the ninth edition of this continental championship. The event was held in Singapore from 1 to 5 April 2026.

New Zealand won the first title after defeating South Korea in the final.

== Host selection ==
FIBA and Sport Singapore announced on 28 March 2025 the extension of their existing partnership to host a series of events in 2026 and 2027, marking concrete steps to grow the profile of 3x3 basketball within the local sporting community.

== Venue ==
The venue was at the OCBC Square, The Kallang.

2026 FIBA 3x3 Asia Cup – Men's tournament is located in Singapore	Singapore
2026 FIBA 3x3 Asia Cup – Men's tournament is located in Singapore	OCBC Square, The Kallang

== Participating teams ==
All National Federations in the Asia and Oceania region were invited for the 2026 FIBA 3x3 Asia Cup.

Preliminary round

Pool A

- Mongolia (1)
- Chinese Taipei (8)
- Qualifier Pool A

Pool B

- China (2)
- Australia (7)
- Qualifier Pool B

Pool C

- Japan (3)
- Singapore (H) (6)
- Qualifier Pool C

Pool D

- New Zealand (4)
- Qatar (5)
- Qualifier Pool D

Qualifying draw

Pool A

- Philippines (9)
- Thailand (15)
- Maldives (22)

Pool B

- Malaysia (10)
- Saudi Arabia (14)
- Turkmenistan (16)
- Macau (21)

Pool C

- Tonga (13)
- South Korea (17)
- Vietnam (20)

Pool D

- Kazakhstan (11)
- Bahrain (12)
- Hong Kong (18)
- India (19)

== Qualifying draw ==
The four group winners qualified for the next round.

=== Pool Qualifying Draw A ===
Pos	Team	Pld	W	L	PF	PA	PD	Qualification	(Philippines)	(Thailand)	(Maldives)
1	Philippines	2	2	0	38	31	+7	Preliminary round		17–15	21–16
2	Thailand	2	1	1	36	28	+8				21–11
3	Maldives	2	0	2	27	42	−15				

Source: FIBA
Rules for classification: 1) Wins; 2) Head-to-head record; 3) Points scored.

=== Pool Qualifying Draw B ===
Pos	Team	Pld	W	L	PF	PA	PD	Qualification	(Malaysia)	(Turkmenistan)	(Macau)	(Saudi Arabia)
1	Malaysia	3	3	0	64	50	+14	Preliminary round			20–16	22–14
2	Turkmenistan	3	2	1	60	37	+23		20–22			
3	Macau	3	1	2	43	57	−14			5–21		
4	Saudi Arabia	3	0	3	40	63	−23			10–19	16–22	

Source: FIBA
Rules for classification: 1) Wins; 2) Head-to-head record; 3) Points scored.

=== Pool Qualifying Draw C ===
Pos	Team	Pld	W	L	PF	PA	PD	Qualification	(South Korea)	(Vietnam)	(Tonga)
1	South Korea	2	2	0	42	18	+24	Preliminary round		21–7	
2	Vietnam	2	1	1	28	40	−12				
3	Tonga	2	0	2	30	42	−12		21–11	19–21	

Source: FIBA
Rules for classification: 1) Wins; 2) Head-to-head record; 3) Points scored.

=== Pool Qualifying Draw D ===
Pos	Team	Pld	W	L	PF	PA	PD	Qualification	(India)	(Kazakhstan)	(Hong Kong)	(Bahrain)
1	India	3	3	0	60	48	+12	Preliminary round			19–18	
2	Kazakhstan	3	2	1	59	50	+9		18–20			20–16
3	Hong Kong	3	1	2	47	54	−7			14–21		
4	Bahrain	3	0	3	42	56	−14		12–21		14–15	

Source: FIBA
Rules for classification: 1) Wins; 2) Head-to-head record; 3) Points scored.

== Preliminary round ==
=== Pool A ===
Pos	Team	Pld	W	L	PF	PA	PD	Qualification	(Mongolia)	(Philippines)	(Chinese Taipei)
1	Mongolia	2	2	0	42	34	+8	Knockout stage		21–19	21–15
2	Philippines	2	1	1	40	34	+6	Knockout stage			
3	Chinese Taipei	2	0	2	28	42	−14			13–21	

Source: FIBA
Rules for classification: 1) Wins; 2) Head-to-head record; 3) Points scored.

=== Pool B ===
Pos	Team	Pld	W	L	PF	PA	PD	Qualification	(China)	(Australia)	(Malaysia)
1	China	2	1	1	40	36	+4	Knockout stage		21–15	19–21
2	Australia	2	1	1	36	31	+5	Knockout stage			21–10
3	Malaysia	2	1	1	31	40	−9				

Source: FIBA
Rules for classification: 1) Wins; 2) Head-to-head record; 3) Points scored.

=== Pool C ===
Pos	Team	Pld	W	L	PF	PA	PD	Qualification	(South Korea)	(Japan)	(Singapore)
1	South Korea	2	2	0	41	34	+7	Knockout stage			
2	Japan	2	1	1	35	36	−1	Knockout stage	15–20		20–16
3	Singapore (H)	2	0	2	35	41	−6		19–21		

Source: FIBA
Rules for classification: 1) Wins; 2) Head-to-head record; 3) Points scored.
(H) Hosts

=== Pool D ===
Pos	Team	Pld	W	L	PF	PA	PD	Qualification	(New Zealand)	(Qatar)	(India)
1	New Zealand	2	2	0	37	22	+15	Knockout stage		21–11	16–11
2	Qatar	2	1	1	27	31	−4	Knockout stage			16–10
3	India	2	0	2	21	32	−11				

Source: FIBA
Rules for classification: 1) Wins; 2) Head-to-head record; 3) Points scored.

== Knockout stage ==
Quarter-finals
5 April
Mongolia	20
Japan	21
5 April
New Zealand	21
Australia	16
5 April
China	20
Qatar	17
5 April
South Korea	18
Philippines	15

Semi-finals
5 April
Japan	16
New Zealand	21
5 April
China	15
South Korea	21

Final
5 April
New Zealand	21
South Korea	15
Third place
5 April
Japan	20
China	22

== Final ranking ==
Pos	Team	Pld	W	L	W%	PF	PA
1st place, gold medalist(s)	New Zealand	5	5	0	100%	100	20.0
2nd place, silver medalist(s)	South Korea	5	4	1	80%	95	19.0
3rd place, bronze medalist(s)	China	5	3	2	60%	97	19.4
4	Japan	5	2	3	40%	92	18.4
5	Mongolia	3	2	1	67%	62	20.7
6	Philippines	3	1	2	33%	55	18.3
7	Australia	3	1	2	33%	52	17.3
8	Qatar	3	1	2	33%	44	14.7
9	Malaysia	2	1	1	50%	31	15.5
10	Singapore	2	0	2	00%	35	17.5
11	Chinese Taipei	2	0	2	00%	28	14.0
12	India	2	0	2	00%	21	10.5
Eliminated in Qualifying draw
13	Turkmenistan	3	2	1	67%	60	20.0
14	Kazakhstan	3	2	1	67%	59	19.7
15	Thailand	2	1	1	50%	36	18.0
16	Vietnam	2	1	1	50%	28	14.0
17	Hong Kong	3	1	2	33%	47	15.7
18	Macau	3	1	2	33%	43	14.3
19	Tonga	2	0	2	00%	30	15.0
20	Bahrain	3	0	3	00%	42	14.0
21	Maldives	2	0	2	00%	27	13.5
22	Saudi Arabia	3	0	3	00%	40	13.3
