= 3x3 basketball at the Asian Beach Games =

- Most recent season or competition: 3x3 basketball at the 2026 Asian Beach Games
- Sport: Basketball
- First season: 2008
- Country: FIBA Asia member nations
- Continent: Asia
- Most titles: M: Qatar (3 titles); W: China (2 titles)

3x3 basketball at the Asian Beach Games has been contested in the continental games since the inaugural 2008 edition in Bali, Indonesia. IT is sometimes referred to as beach basketball in earlier editions.

== History ==
3x3 basketball then known as "FIBA 33" was introduced at the 2008 Asian Beach Games in Bali, Indonesia – the first ever edition of the Asian Beach Games. The 3x3 tournaments in Bali for boys and girls were for players 17 years old and under and served as a test event for the introduction of the basketball variant in the 2010 Summer Youth Olympics in Singapore.

The sport was not included in the 2010 Asian Beach Games in Muscat, Oman. It later returned for the 2012 edition in Haiyang, China.

== Summary ==
=== Men ===
Year	Host	Final			Third place game		
Year	Host	Winner	Score	Runner-up	3rd place	Score	4th place
2008	(Indonesia); Bali	India	23–17	Philippines	Malaysia	33–22	Kuwait
2012	(China); Haiyang	Afghanistan	16–9	Turkmenistan	Mongolia	15–13	Bangladesh
2014	(Thailand); Phuket	Qatar	21–20	India	Thailand	17–15	Bangladesh
2016	(Vietnam); Da Nang	Qatar	15–12	Mongolia	Iraq	16–15	Thailand
2026	(China); Sanya	Qatar	21–10	Thailand	China	21–13	Philippines

=== Women ===
Year	Host	Final			Third place game		
Year	Host	Winner	Score	Runner-up	3rd place	Score	4th place
2008	(Indonesia); Bali	Japan	33–27	Thailand	India	34–25	Malaysia
2012	(China); Haiyang	India	17–14	China	Philippines	16–15	Mongolia
2014	(Thailand); Phuket	Chinese Taipei	15–13	China	Thailand	13–7	Mongolia
2016	(Vietnam); Da Nang	China	15–9	Thailand	Chinese Taipei	21–9	Turkmenistan
2026	(China); Sanya	China	21–13	Philippines	Thailand	17–8	Singapore

== Medal table ==
Rank	Nation	Gold	Silver	Bronze	Total
1	Qatar (QAT)	3	0	0	3
2	China (CHN)	2	2	1	5
3	India (IND)	2	1	1	4
4	Chinese Taipei (TPE)	1	0	1	2
5	Afghanistan (AFG)	1	0	0	1
5	Japan (JPN)	1	0	0	1
7	Thailand (THA)	0	3	3	6
8	Philippines (PHI)	0	2	1	3
9	Mongolia (MGL)	0	1	1	2
10	Turkmenistan (TKM)	0	1	0	1
11	Iraq (IRQ)	0	0	1	1
11	Malaysia (MAS)	0	0	1	1
Totals (12 entries)		10	10	10	30

== Participating nations ==
=== Men ===
Team	(Indonesia) 2008	(China) 2012	(Thailand) 2014	(Vietnam) 2016	(China) 2026	Years
Afghanistan		1st	10th			2
Bahrain					12th	1
Bangladesh		4th	4th	11th		3
Bhutan		10th	9th	9th		3
China		7th	5th	5th	3rd	4
Chinese Taipei					13th	1
Hong Kong					10th	1
India	1st	5th	2nd		7th	4
Indonesia	7th			6th	16th	3
Iran					6th	1
Iraq				3rd		1
Japan	8th					1
Kazakhstan					14th	1
Kuwait	4th					1
Laos			12th	12th		2
Macau					15th	1
Malaysia	3rd				5th	2
Maldives			11th			1
Mongolia		3rd	7th	2nd	8th	4
Nepal		7th		10th		2
Oman			6th			1
Palestine		10th				1
Philippines	2nd				4th	2
Qatar		7th	1st	1st	1st	4
Singapore	6th				9th	2
Sri Lanka					11th	1
Thailand	5th	6th	3rd	4th	2nd	5
Turkmenistan		2nd	8th	7th		3
Vietnam		10th		8th		2
Number of teams	8	12	12	12	16	

=== Women ===
Team	(Indonesia) 2008	(China) 2012	(Thailand) 2014	(Vietnam) 2016	(China) 2026	Years
Bhutan				8th		1
China		2nd	2nd	1st	1st	4
Chinese Taipei			1st	3rd	8th	3
India	3rd	1st	7th			3
Indonesia	5th				9th	2
Japan	1st					1
Kazakhstan					7th	1
Kyrgyzstan					13th	1
Laos				9th		1
Macau					10th	1
Malaysia	4th				5th	2
Maldives		7th				1
Mongolia		4th	4th	7th	6th	4
Nepal		7th	8th			2
Philippines		3rd	5th	6th	2nd	4
Qatar					12th	1
Singapore					4th	1
Sri Lanka					11th	1
Thailand	2nd	5th	3rd	2nd	3rd	5
Turkmenistan		6th	6th	4th		3
Vietnam				5th		1
Number of teams	5	8	8	9	13	
