= 3x3 basketball at the Asian Indoor and Martial Arts Games =

3x3 basketball was featured in the Asian Indoor Games and the Asian Indoor and Martial Arts Games official programme in 2009, and since 2017. The inaugural staging of 3x3 basketball was seen in 2007, as a demonstration sport. The programme includes 2 events (men and women). The FIBA and FIBA Asia are the world and continental respectively governing body.

== Editions ==
There are four Asian Indoor Games and Asian Indoor and Martial Arts Games that 3x3 basketball competed, as both an official programme and a demonstration sport.

Games	Year	Host nation	Venue	Men's champion	Women's champion	Ref.
II	2007	Macau	IPM Multisport Pavilion, Sé	Iran	Not held	
III	2009	Vietnam	Lãnh Binh Thăng Gymnasium, Ho Chi Minh City	Iran	Thailand	
V	2017	Turkmenistan	Ashgabat Basketball Arena, Ashgabat	Qatar	Thailand	
VI	2026	KSA				

== Men's tournaments ==
Year	Hosts	Gold Medal Game			Bronze Medal Game		
Year	Hosts	Gold	Score	Silver	Bronze	Score	Fourth Place
2007; Details	Macau	Iran	33–28	China	Hong Kong	33–30	Philippines
2009; Details	(Vietnam); Ho Chi Minh City	Iran	33–9	Saudi Arabia	Thailand	35–27	India
2017; Details	(Turkmenistan); Ashgabat	Qatar	22–12	Iraq	Mongolia	21–11	Kyrgyzstan

=== Participating nations ===
Nation	(Macau) 2007 (8)	(Vietnam) 2009 (11)	(Turkmenistan) 2017 (16)	Overall appearances
Afghanistan		=9th	=9th	2
China	2nd			1
Chinese Taipei	=5th		=9th	2
Guam			=13th	1
Hong Kong	3rd			1
India	=5th	4th		2
Indonesia			=5th	1
Iran	1st	1st		2
Iraq			2nd	1
Jordan		=7th	=13th	2
Kuwait		=5th		1
Kyrgyzstan			4th	1
Lebanon			=9th	1
Macau	=7th			1
Malaysia	=7th			1
Mongolia			3rd	1
Nepal		=9th	=13th	2
Philippines	4th			1
Qatar		=9th	1st	2
Samoa			=5th	1
Saudi Arabia		2nd		1
Tajikistan			=13th	1
Thailand		3rd	=5th	2
Turkmenistan			=5th	1
Uzbekistan		=7th	=9th	2
Vietnam		=5th		1

== Women's tournaments ==
Year	Hosts	Gold Medal Game			Bronze Medal Game		
Year	Hosts	Gold	Score	Silver	Bronze	Score	Fourth Place
2009; Details	(Vietnam); Ho Chi Minh City	Thailand	No playoffs	India	Vietnam	No playoffs	Jordan
2017; Details	(Turkmenistan); Ashgabat	Thailand	22–20 (OT)	Uzbekistan	Turkmenistan	15–12	Syria

=== Participating nations ===
Nation	(Vietnam) 2009 (5)	(Turkmenistan) 2017 (12)	Overall appearances
Afghanistan		=9th	1
Chinese Taipei		=5th	1
Cook Islands		=9th	1
Guam		=9th	1
India	2nd		1
Indonesia		=5th	1
Iran		=5th	1
Jordan	4th	=5th	2
Kuwait	5th		1
Mongolia		=9th	1
Syria		4th	1
Thailand	1st	1st	2
Turkmenistan		3rd	1
Uzbekistan		2nd	1
Vietnam	3rd		1
