= 3x3 basketball at the 2026 Asian Beach Games =

- Venue: Sanya Sports Centre Gymnasium
- Dates: 25–29 April 2026

3x3 basketball competition at the 2026 Asian Beach Games was held in Sanya, China from 25 to 29 April 2026 at the Sanya Sports Centre Gymnasium.

== Medalists ==
Event	Gold	Silver	Bronze
Men	Qatar; Dejan Janjić; Abdulrahman Saad; Mohammed Abbasher; Ousmane Diatta Dieng	Thailand; Freddie Lish; Chanatip Jakrawan; Panthawat Techasamran; Nicola Franco	China; Yan Peng; Qi Haotong; Ma Diancheng; Luo Xudong
Women	China; Yang Hengyu; Cao Junwei; Sun Fengyi; Wang Lili	Philippines; Mikka Cacho; Gabi Bade; Kaye Pingol; Tantoy Ferrer	Thailand; Supavadee Kunchuan; Sroifa Phetnin; Sasiporn Wongtapha; Kanokwan Prajuapsook

== Medal table ==
Rank	Nation	Gold	Silver	Bronze	Total
1	China (CHN)	1	0	1	2
2	Qatar (QAT)	1	0	0	1
3	Thailand (THA)	0	1	1	2
4	Philippines (PHI)	0	1	0	1
Totals (4 entries)		2	2	2	6

== Results ==
=== Men ===
==== Preliminary round ====
===== Group A =====
Pos	Team	Pld	W	L	PF	PA	PD
1	Philippines	3	2	1	56	57	−1
2	Iran	3	2	1	55	37	+18
3	China	3	2	1	53	43	+10
4	Macau	3	0	3	36	63	−27

Source: FIBA

25 April
11:25

Report

China	18–21	Philippines
Pts: Yan 7		Pts: Cabañero 9

Sports Centre Gymnasium, Sanya
Referees: Quinn (INA), Dale (NZL)

25 April
11:50

Report

Macau	9–21	Iran
Pts: Yang 5		Pts: Grigorian 9

Sports Centre Gymnasium, Sanya
Referees: Dale (NZL), Laosaksam (THA)

25 April
12:40

Report

Iran	13–14	China
Pts: Rahimi 5		Pts: Qi 6

Sports Centre Gymnasium, Sanya
Referees: Quinn (INA), Leong (SGP)

25 April
13:05

Report

Philippines	21–18	Macau
Pts: Cabañero 7		Pts: Ho 7

Sports Centre Gymnasium, Sanya
Referees: Nozaki (JPN), Dale (NZL)

27 April
11:25

Report

China	21–9	Macau
Pts: Qi 6		Pts: Zeng 5

Sports Centre Gymnasium, Sanya
Referees: Dale (NZL), Leong (SGP)

27 April
11:50

Report

Philippines	14–21	Iran
Pts: Manday 9		Pts: Rahimi 8

Sports Centre Gymnasium, Sanya
Referees: Quinn (INA), Dale (NZL)

===== Group B =====
Pos	Team	Pld	W	L	PF	PA	PD
1	Malaysia	3	3	0	61	35	+26
2	Mongolia	3	2	1	48	42	+6
3	Sri Lanka	3	1	2	44	54	−10
4	Indonesia	3	0	3	35	57	−22

Source: FIBA

26 April
11:25

Report

Mongolia	15–12	Indonesia
Pts: Enkh-Amar 5		Pts: Enguio 6

Sports Centre Gymnasium, Sanya
Referees: Kim (KOR), Cong (CHN)

26 April
11:50

Report

Sri Lanka	12–21	Malaysia
Pts: Nilantha 5		Pts: Ting 13

Sports Centre Gymnasium, Sanya
Referees: Chan (HKG), Leong (SGP)

26 April
12:40

Report

Malaysia	19–12	Mongolia
Pts: Ting 11		Pts: Ölziibat 4

Sports Centre Gymnasium, Sanya
Referees: Laosaksam (THA), Kim (KOR)

26 April
13:05

Report

Indonesia	12–21	Sri Lanka
Pts: Hady 7		Pts: Nilantha 9

Sports Centre Gymnasium, Sanya
Referees: Chan (HKG), Cong (CHN)

27 April
16:45

Report

Mongolia	22–11	Sri Lanka
Pts: Ölziibat 9		Pts: Gamage, Nilantha 4

Sports Centre Gymnasium, Sanya
Referees: Nagoshi (JPN), Nozaki (JPN)

27 April
17:10

Report

Indonesia	11–22	Malaysia
Pts: Hady 6		Pts: Chong 10

Sports Centre Gymnasium, Sanya
Referees: Kim (KOR), Laosaksam (THA)

===== Group C =====
Pos	Team	Pld	W	L	PF	PA	PD
1	Qatar	3	3	0	57	38	+19
2	India	3	2	1	51	37	+14
3	Bahrain	3	1	2	44	55	−11
4	Kazakhstan	3	0	3	39	61	−22

Source: FIBA

25 April
17:10

Report

Qatar	21–11	Bahrain
Pts: Janjić, Abbasher 7		Pts: Ajukwa 6

Sports Centre Gymnasium, Sanya
Referees: Kim (KOR), Nagoshi (JPN)

25 April
17:35

Report

India	19–10	Kazakhstan
Pts: Dagar 7		Pts: Oralbekov 4

Sports Centre Gymnasium, Sanya
Referees: Cong (CHN), Chen (TPE)

25 April
18:50

Report

Kazakhstan	15–22	Qatar
Pts: Tangiyev 6		Pts: Janjić 11

Sports Centre Gymnasium, Sanya
Referees: Kim (KOR), Chen (TPE)

25 April
19:15

Report

Bahrain	12–20	India
Pts: Dragović 6		Pts: Dagar 8

Sports Centre Gymnasium, Sanya
Referees: Nagoshi (JPN), Cong (CHN)

27 April
13:05

Report

Qatar	15–12	India
Pts: Janjić, Saad 7		Pts: Dagar 6

Sports Centre Gymnasium, Sanya
Referees: Leong (SGP), Cong (CHN)

27 April
13:30

Report

Bahrain	21–14	Kazakhstan
Pts: Dragović 17		Pts: Tangiyev 5

Sports Centre Gymnasium, Sanya
Referees: Quinn (INA), Cong (CHN)

===== Group D =====
Pos	Team	Pld	W	L	PF	PA	PD
1	Thailand	3	3	0	62	45	+17
2	Singapore	3	2	1	50	50	0
3	Hong Kong	3	1	2	51	61	−10
4	Chinese Taipei	3	0	3	53	60	−7

Source: FIBA

26 April
16:45

Report

Singapore	18–14	Chinese Taipei
Pts: Zahid 9		Pts: Chang 6

Sports Centre Gymnasium, Sanya
Referees: Dale (NZL), Nozaki (JPN)

26 April
17:10

Report

Hong Kong	15–20	Thailand
Pts: Chan M., Lam, Chan W. 5		Pts: Lish 8

Sports Centre Gymnasium, Sanya
Referees: Dale (NZL), Nagoshi (JPN)

26 April
18:00

Report

Thailand	21–11	Singapore
Pts: Jakrawan 10		Pts: Zahid 5

Sports Centre Gymnasium, Sanya
Referees: Quinn (INA), Chen (TPE)

26 April
18:25

Report

Chinese Taipei	20–21	Hong Kong
Pts: Chang 15		Pts: Chan M., Chan W. 6

Sports Centre Gymnasium, Sanya
Referees: Nagoshi (JPN), Nozaki (JPN)

27 April
18:00

Report

Singapore	21–15	Hong Kong
Pts: Kesevan-Kankam 8		Pts: Lam 9

Sports Centre Gymnasium, Sanya
Referees: Chen (TPE), Nagoshi (JPN)

27 April
18:25

Report

Chinese Taipei	19–21	Thailand
Pts: Chang 11		Pts: Lish 13

Sports Centre Gymnasium, Sanya
Referees: Nagoshi (JPN), Kim (KOR)

==== Knockout round ====
Play-in matches
28 April
India	19
Sri Lanka	18
28 April
Mongolia	15
Bahrain	12
28 April
Iran	21
Hong Kong	15
28 April
Singapore	15
China	21

Quarterfinals
28 April
Philippines	18
India	14
28 April
Mongolia	11
Thailand	21
28 April
Qatar	20
Iran	16
28 April
China	22
Malaysia	15

Semifinals
29 April
Philippines	18
Thailand	20
29 April
Qatar	18
China	16

Gold medal match
29 April
Thailand	10
Qatar	21
Bronze medal match
29 April
Philippines	13
China	21

===== Play-in matches =====
28 April
11:50

Report

India	19–18	Sri Lanka
Pts: Singh 9		Pts: Nilantha 8

Sports Centre Gymnasium, Sanya
Referees: Dale (NZL), Cong (CHN)

28 April
12:15

Report

Mongolia	15–12	Bahrain
Pts: Enkhtemüülen, Baljinnyam 5		Pts: four players 3

Sports Centre Gymnasium, Sanya
Referees: Quinn (INA), Nozaki (JPN)

28 April
13:30

Report

Iran	21–15	Hong Kong
Pts: Yazarloo 9		Pts: Lam, Chan W. 6

Sports Centre Gymnasium, Sanya
Referees: Nagoshi (JPN), Leong (SGP)

28 April
13:55

Report

Singapore	15–21	China
Pts: Ching 12		Pts: Qi 8

Sports Centre Gymnasium, Sanya
Referees: Quinn (INA), Dale (NZL)

===== Quarterfinals =====
28 April
17:10

Report

Philippines	18–14	India
Pts: Cabañero 7		Pts: Dagar 6

Sports Centre Gymnasium, Sanya
Referees: Dale (NZL), Cong (CHN)

28 April
17:35

Report

Mongolia	11–21	Thailand
Pts: Ölziibat, Enkhtemüülen, Baljinnyam 3		Pts: Techasamran 11

Sports Centre Gymnasium, Sanya
Referees: Quinn (INA), Kim (KOR)

28 April
18:50

Report

Qatar	20–16	Iran
Pts: Saad 10		Pts: Grigorian 8

Sports Centre Gymnasium, Sanya
Referees: Quinn (INA), Nagoshi (JPN)

28 April
19:15

Report

China	22–15	Malaysia
Pts: Ma 12		Pts: Ooi 7

Sports Centre Gymnasium, Sanya
Referees: Leong (SGP), Dale (NZL)

===== Semifinals =====
29 April
14:50

Report

Philippines	18–20	Thailand
Pts: Cabañero 9		Pts: Franco 9

Sports Centre Gymnasium, Sanya
Referees: Cong (CHN), Dale (NZL)

29 April
15:15

Report

Qatar	18–16	China
Pts: Dieng 7		Pts: Qi 6

Sports Centre Gymnasium, Sanya
Referees: Quinn (INA), Nagoshi (JPN)

===== Bronze medal match =====
29 April
18:30

Report

Philippines	13–21	China
Pts: Cabañero, Crisostomo, Manday 4		Pts: Ma 7

Sports Centre Gymnasium, Sanya
Referees: Dale (NZL), Nagoshi (JPN)

===== Gold medal match =====
29 April
19:30

Report

Thailand	10–21	Qatar
Pts: Franco 4		Pts: Janjić 12

Sports Centre Gymnasium, Sanya
Referees: Cong (CHN), Quinn (INA)

=== Women ===
==== Preliminary round ====
===== Group A =====
Pos	Team	Pld	W	L	PF	PA	PD
1	China	2	2	0	42	13	+29
2	Kazakhstan	2	1	1	29	28	+1
3	Qatar	2	0	2	12	42	−30

Source: FIBA

25 April
11:00

Report

China	22–8	Kazakhstan
Pts: Yang 9		Pts: Zhakipova, Otegenova 3

Sports Centre Gymnasium, Sanya
Referees: Leong (SGP), Laosaksam (THA)

25 April
12:15

Report

China	21–5	Qatar
Pts: Sun 7		Pts: El-Sayed 3

Sports Centre Gymnasium, Sanya
Referees: Nozaki (JPN), Laosaksam (THA)

27 April
11:00

Report

Kazakhstan	21–7	Qatar
Pts: Zhakipova 10		Pts: Gasir, El-Sayed, Taweel 2

Sports Centre Gymnasium, Sanya
Referees: Chan (HKG), Cong (CHN)

===== Group B =====
Pos	Team	Pld	W	L	PF	PA	PD
1	Malaysia	2	2	0	37	26	+11
2	Mongolia	2	1	1	32	39	−7
3	Chinese Taipei	2	0	2	32	36	−4

Source: FIBA

26 April
11:00

Report

Mongolia	20–18	Chinese Taipei
Pts: Bolor-Erdene 10		Pts: Chen 8

Sports Centre Gymnasium, Sanya
Referees: Laosaksam (THA), Leong (SGP)

26 April
12:15

Report

Malaysia	21–12	Mongolia
Pts: Tan 7		Pts: Bolor-Erdene 9

Sports Centre Gymnasium, Sanya
Referees: Chan (HKG), Cong (CHN)

27 April
16:20

Report

Chinese Taipei	14–16	Malaysia
Pts: Chang 8		Pts: Tan 8

Sports Centre Gymnasium, Sanya
Referees: Nozaki (JPN), Laosaksam (THA)

===== Group C =====
Pos	Team	Pld	W	L	PF	PA	PD
1	Philippines	3	3	0	57	35	+22
2	Indonesia	3	2	1	44	38	+6
3	Macau	3	1	2	35	49	−14
4	Kyrgyzstan	3	0	3	37	51	−14

Source: FIBA

25 April
16:20

Report

Philippines	15–11	Indonesia
Pts: Cacho 5		Pts: Nurfadillah 6

Sports Centre Gymnasium, Sanya
Referees: Chen (TPE), Nagoshi (JPN)

25 April
16:45

Report

Kyrgyzstan	11–14	Macau
Pts: Mazikina 7		Pts: Chan 6

Sports Centre Gymnasium, Sanya
Referees: Chan (HKG), Kim (KOR)

25 April
18:00

Report

Macau	9–21	Philippines
Pts: Chan 5		Pts: Ferrer 8

Sports Centre Gymnasium, Sanya
Referees: Chan (HKG), Chen (TPE)

25 April
18:25

Report

Indonesia	16–11	Kyrgyzstan
Pts: Sriartha, Candra 7		Pts: Mazikina 7

Sports Centre Gymnasium, Sanya
Referees: Cong (CHN), Chan (HKG)

27 April
12:15

Report

Philippines	21–15	Kyrgyzstan
Pts: Ferrer 8		Pts: Mazikina 8

Sports Centre Gymnasium, Sanya
Referees: Chan (HKG), Leong (SGP)

27 April
12:40

Report

Indonesia	17–12	Macau
Pts: Nurfadillah 8		Pts: Chan 5

Sports Centre Gymnasium, Sanya
Referees: Dale (NZL), Chan (HKG)

===== Group D =====
Pos	Team	Pld	W	L	PF	PA	PD
1	Thailand	2	2	0	41	19	+22
2	Singapore	2	1	1	34	25	+9
3	Sri Lanka	2	0	2	11	42	−31

Source: FIBA

26 April
16:20

Report

Singapore	13–20	Thailand
Pts: Ang 5		Pts: Kunchuan, Prajuapsook 6

Sports Centre Gymnasium, Sanya
Referees: Chen (TPE), Quinn (INA)

26 April
17:35

Report

Thailand	21–6	Sri Lanka
Pts: Kunchuan, Prajuapsook 7		Pts: Washington 3

Sports Centre Gymnasium, Sanya
Referees: Dale (NZL), Chen (TPE)

27 April
17:35

Report

Singapore	21–5	Sri Lanka
Pts: Ang 10		Pts: T. Perera, Mills 2

Sports Centre Gymnasium, Sanya
Referees: Nozaki (JPN), Chen (TPE)

==== Knockout round ====
Play-in matches
28 April
Indonesia	10
Chinese Taipei	21
28 April
Mongolia	21
Macau	6
28 April
Kazakhstan	21
Sri Lanka	9
28 April
Singapore	21
Qatar	1

Quarterfinals
28 April
China	21
Chinese Taipei	9
28 April
Mongolia	9
Thailand	21
28 April
Philippines	16
Kazakhstan	11
28 April
Singapore	15
Malaysia	7

Semifinals
29 April
China	18
Thailand	16
29 April
Philippines	20
Singapore	13

Gold medal match
29 April
China	21
Philippines	13
Bronze medal match
29 April
Thailand	17
Singapore	8

===== Play-in matches =====
28 April
11:00

Report

Indonesia	10–21	Chinese Taipei
Pts: Sriartha 4		Pts: Chiu 8

Sports Centre Gymnasium, Sanya
Referees: Nozaki (JPN), Kim (KOR)

28 April
11:25

Report

Mongolia	21–6	Macau
Pts: Bolor-Erdene 8		Pts: Cheang 3

Sports Centre Gymnasium, Sanya
Referees: Nagoshi (JPN), Chan (HKG)

28 April
12:40

Report

Kazakhstan	21–9	Sri Lanka
Pts: Yerkebay 8		Pts: Washington 4

Sports Centre Gymnasium, Sanya
Referees: Laosaksam (THA), Chen (TPE)

28 April
13:05

Report

Singapore	21–1	Qatar
Pts: Han 8		Pts: Soliman 1

Sports Centre Gymnasium, Sanya
Referees: Chan (HKG), Cong (CHN)

===== Quarterfinals =====
28 April
16:20

Report

China	21–9	Chinese Taipei
Pts: Yang 10		Pts: Li 4

Sports Centre Gymnasium, Sanya
Referees: Leong (SGP), Nozaki (JPN)

28 April
16:45

Report

Mongolia	9–21	Thailand
Pts: Bolortsetseg 4		Pts: Kunchuan 9

Sports Centre Gymnasium, Sanya
Referees: Chen (TPE), Kim (KOR)

28 April
18:00

Report

Philippines	16–11	Kazakhstan
Pts: Ferrer 6		Pts: Yerkebay 4

Sports Centre Gymnasium, Sanya
Referees: Chan (HKG), Cong (CHN)

28 April
18:25

Report

Singapore	15–7	Malaysia
Pts: Lim 6		Pts: Tan 4

Sports Centre Gymnasium, Sanya
Referees: Laosaksam (THA), Nozaki (JPN)

===== Semifinals =====
29 April
14:00

Report

China	18–16	Thailand
Pts: Wang 9		Pts: Kunchuan 7

Sports Centre Gymnasium, Sanya
Referees: Leong (SGP), Nozaki (JPN)

29 April
14:25

Report

Philippines	20–13	Singapore
Pts: Cacho 8		Pts: Lai, Ang 4

Sports Centre Gymnasium, Sanya
Referees: Kim (KOR), Laosaksam (THA)

===== Bronze medal match =====
29 April
18:00

Report

Thailand	17–8	Singapore
Pts: Wongtapha 7		Pts: Lim 4

Sports Centre Gymnasium, Sanya
Referees: Kim (KOR), Chen (TPE)

===== Gold medal match =====
29 April
19:00

Report

China	21–13	Philippines
Pts: Yang 7		Pts: Cacho 5

Sports Centre Gymnasium, Sanya
Referees: Nozaki (JPN), Dale (NZL)
