= 3x3 basketball at the 2025 Asian Youth Games =

- Venue: Umm Al-Hassam Hall
- Dates: 23–27 October 2025

3x3 basketball at the 2025 Asian Youth Games was contested by 21 teams in the boys' tournament and 14 teams in the girls' tournament. All games were held at Manama, Bahrain.

China won the boys' gold medal after beating the host team Bahrain in the final game while the girls' final went to the overtime, and Chinese Taipei managed to beat Iran to win the gold.

== Medalists ==
Event	Gold	Silver	Bronze
Boys	China; Xu Ziqi; Tong Yuzheng; Yao Shengbin; Zuo Yuxuan	Bahrain; Yousif Meshael; Sergej Šćekić; Somto Onoduenyi; Hassan Abdulkadir	Qatar; Azam Yakan; Mouhamadou Diop; Becayekane Mbodj; Mohamed Said Bedri
Girls	Chinese Taipei; Wu Pei-hsuan; Chen Xin; Hsieh Ai-tung; Chiao Li-er	Iran; Elina Evini; Hasti Khazaei; Elena Ahmadian; Mobina Bereihi	China; Zhang Xidan; Chen Qinyu; Liu Yuetong; Xu Wenzhuo

== Medal table ==
Rank	Nation	Gold	Silver	Bronze	Total
1	China (CHN)	1	0	1	2
2	Chinese Taipei (TPE)	1	0	0	1
3	Bahrain (BRN)	0	1	0	1
3	Iran (IRI)	0	1	0	1
5	Qatar (QAT)	0	0	1	1
Totals (5 entries)		2	2	2	6

== Results ==
=== Boys ===
==== Preliminary round ====
===== Pool A =====
Pos	Team	Pld	W	L	PF	PA	PD	Pts
1	Mongolia	4	4	0	84	53	+31	8
2	Chinese Taipei	4	3	1	71	59	+12	6
3	Jordan	4	2	2	74	68	+6	4
4	United Arab Emirates	4	1	3	65	71	−6	2
5	Turkmenistan	4	0	4	41	84	−43	0

Source: FIBA

23 October
9:00

Turkmenistan	12–21	United Arab Emirates
Pts: Kerimow 6		Pts: Hashil 11

Umm Al-Hassam Hall, Manama
Referees: Li (CHN), Laosaksam (THA)

23 October
9:25

Chinese Taipei	21–16	Jordan
Pts: Lu, Liu 8		Pts: M. Sahlieh 12

Umm Al-Hassam Hall, Manama
Referees: Rulyov (KAZ), Yin (MAS)

23 October
11:20

Mongolia	21–11	Turkmenistan
Pts: Bilegt 7		Pts: Tarasenko, Trufanow 5

Umm Al-Hassam Hall, Manama
Referees: Rulyov (KAZ), Li (CHN)

23 October
11:45

United Arab Emirates	11–18	Chinese Taipei
Pts: Hashil 5		Pts: Kao 8

Umm Al-Hassam Hall, Manama
Referees: Mohan (IND), Rulyov (KAZ)

23 October
13:40

Chinese Taipei	11–21	Mongolia
Pts: Lu 5		Pts: Sükhbat 12

Umm Al-Hassam Hall, Manama
Referees: Yin (MAS), Mohan (IND)

25 October
10:30

Jordan	21–7	Turkmenistan
Pts: M. Sahlieh 10		Pts: Kerimow 4

Umm Al-Hassam Hall, Manama
Referees: Laosaksam (THA), Su (TPE)

25 October
10:55

United Arab Emirates	14–21	Mongolia
Pts: Hashil 6		Pts: Sükhbat 10

Umm Al-Hassam Hall, Manama
Referees: Sheng (MAS), Cong (CHN)

25 October
12:50

Turkmenistan	11–21	Chinese Taipei
Pts: Akmeredow 4		Pts: Lu 10

Umm Al-Hassam Hall, Manama
Referees: Mohan (IND), Mönkhchuluun (MGL)

25 October
13:15

Mongolia	21–17	Jordan
Pts: Önöbold 11		Pts: Al-Adham 7

Umm Al-Hassam Hall, Manama
Referees: Su (TPE), Sheng (MAS)

25 October
15:10

Jordan	20–19	United Arab Emirates
Pts: M. Sahlieh 10		Pts: Hashil 7

Umm Al-Hassam Hall, Manama
Referees: Chen (TPE), Yin (MAS)

===== Pool B =====
Pos	Team	Pld	W	L	PF	PA	PD	Pts
1	Bahrain	3	3	0	63	34	+29	6
2	China	3	2	1	56	42	+14	4
3	Kyrgyzstan	3	1	2	36	60	−24	2
4	Indonesia	3	0	3	43	62	−19	0

Source: FIBA

24 October
18:20

Indonesia	15–21	Bahrain
Pts: Al-Fayes 10		Pts: Onoduenyi, Abdulkadir 7

Umm Al-Hassam Hall, Manama
Referees: Su (TPE), Cong (CHN)

24 October
20:15

China	21–10	Indonesia
Pts: Yao 9		Pts: Christianto 4

Umm Al-Hassam Hall, Manama
Referees: Yin (MAS), Laosaksam (THA)

24 October
20:40

Bahrain	21–5	Kyrgyzstan
Pts: Abdulkadir 10		Pts: Erikov 3

Umm Al-Hassam Hall, Manama
Referees: Li (CHN), Chen (TPE)

26 October
17:05

Kyrgyzstan	11–21	China
Pts: Asylbekov 5		Pts: Yao 10

Umm Al-Hassam Hall, Manama
Referees: Kim (KOR), Mohan (IND)

26 October
19:00

Indonesia	18–20	Kyrgyzstan
Pts: Al-Fayes 8		Pts: Madaminov 10

Umm Al-Hassam Hall, Manama
Referees: Su (TPE), Cong (CHN)

26 October
19:25

Bahrain	21–14	China
Pts: Abdulkadir 13		Pts: Yao 7

Umm Al-Hassam Hall, Manama
Referees: Mönkhchuluun (MGL), Sheng (MAS)

===== Pool C =====
Pos	Team	Pld	W	L	PF	PA	PD	Pts
1	Qatar	5	5	0	105	59	+46	10
2	Uzbekistan	5	4	1	103	72	+31	8
3	Thailand	5	3	2	92	77	+15	6
4	Cambodia	5	2	3	78	89	−11	4
5	Palestine	5	1	4	63	101	−38	2
6	Maldives	5	0	5	58	101	−43	0

Source: FIBA

23 October
14:05

Qatar	21–7	Cambodia
Pts: Yakan 9		Pts: Heng S. 3

Umm Al-Hassam Hall, Manama
Referees: Chen (TPE), Li (CHN)

23 October
14:30

Thailand	21–11	Palestine
Pts: Boonsrang 8		Pts: Abulaban 5

Umm Al-Hassam Hall, Manama
Referees: Li (CHN), Mohan (IND)

23 October
14:55

Uzbekistan	22–9	Maldives
Pts: Khodjaev 9		Pts: Jameel, Nasheed 3

Umm Al-Hassam Hall, Manama
Referees: Cong (CHN), Nozaki (JPN)

23 October
16:50

Cambodia	19–15	Maldives
Pts: Heng S. 9		Pts: Nasheed 5

Umm Al-Hassam Hall, Manama
Referees: Su (TPE), Mönkhchuluun (MGL)

23 October
17:15

Palestine	14–22	Uzbekistan
Pts: Abulaban 8		Pts: Khodjaev 14

Umm Al-Hassam Hall, Manama
Referees: Cong (CHN), Sheng (MAS)

23 October
17:55

Qatar	22–17	Thailand
Pts: Yakan 10		Pts: Butnuch 6

Umm Al-Hassam Hall, Manama
Referees: Su (TPE), Nozaki (JPN)

23 October
19:50

Thailand	21–15	Cambodia
Pts: Boonsrang 7		Pts: Heng S. 9

Umm Al-Hassam Hall, Manama
Referees: Nozaki (JPN), Sheng (MAS)

23 October
20:15

Uzbekistan	20–21	Qatar
Pts: Khodjaev 12		Pts: Bedri 7

Umm Al-Hassam Hall, Manama
Referees: Cong (CHN), Kim (KOR)

23 October
20:40

Maldives	17–19	Palestine
Pts: Jameel 9		Pts: Freij 7

Umm Al-Hassam Hall, Manama
Referees: Su (TPE), Mönkhchuluun (MGL)

25 October
15:35

Cambodia	21–12	Palestine
Pts: Heng S. 15		Pts: Abulaban 10

Umm Al-Hassam Hall, Manama
Referees: Nozaki (JPN), Li (CHN)

25 October
16:00

Qatar	21–8	Maldives
Pts: Bedri 11		Pts: Jameel, Nasheed 3

Umm Al-Hassam Hall, Manama
Referees: Kim (KOR), Yin (MAS)

25 October
16:25

Thailand	12–21	Uzbekistan
Pts: Allsopp 4		Pts: Sarukhanyan, Saydirasulov 7

Umm Al-Hassam Hall, Manama
Referees: Rulyov (KAZ), Chen (TPE)

25 October
18:35

Uzbekistan	20–16	Cambodia
Pts: Khodjaev 9		Pts: Heng S. 8

Umm Al-Hassam Hall, Manama
Referees: Chen (TPE), Kim (KOR)

25 October
19:00

Maldives	9–21	Thailand
Pts: Aleem 4		Pts: Allsopp 8

Umm Al-Hassam Hall, Manama
Referees: Yin (MAS), Rulyov (KAZ)

25 October
19:25

Palestine	7–21	Qatar
Pts: Abulaban 5		Pts: Yakan 11

Umm Al-Hassam Hall, Manama
Referees: Nozaki (JPN), Li (CHN)

===== Pool D =====
Pos	Team	Pld	W	L	PF	PA	PD	Pts
1	Iran	5	5	0	105	34	+71	10
2	Saudi Arabia	5	4	1	74	74	0	8
3	Kazakhstan	5	3	2	85	73	+12	6
4	Sri Lanka	5	2	3	84	80	+4	4
5	Yemen	5	1	4	67	84	−17	2
6	Bangladesh	5	0	5	28	98	−70	0

Source: FIBA

24 October
9:50

Saudi Arabia	14–10	Bangladesh
Pts: Baltaji 7		Pts: Rahman 4

Umm Al-Hassam Hall, Manama
Referees: Nozaki (JPN), Mohan (IND)

24 October
10:15

Kazakhstan	20–9	Yemen
Pts: Baioraz 13		Pts: Rami, Al-Yamani 3

Umm Al-Hassam Hall, Manama
Referees: Sheng (MAS), Kim (KOR)

24 October
10:40

Iran	21–7	Sri Lanka
Pts: Rashidi 7		Pts: Gerald 4

Umm Al-Hassam Hall, Manama
Referees: Rulyov (KAZ), Mönkhchuluun (MGL)

24 October
12:35

Bangladesh	6–21	Sri Lanka
Pts: Rahman 3		Pts: Gerald 10

Umm Al-Hassam Hall, Manama
Referees: Mohan (IND), Rulyov (KAZ)

24 October
13:00

Yemen	10–21	Iran
Pts: Al-Haithami 7		Pts: Rashidi 10

Umm Al-Hassam Hall, Manama
Referees: Mönkhchuluun (MGL), Nozaki (JPN)

24 October
13:40

Saudi Arabia	21–16	Kazakhstan
Pts: Al-Dubaisi, Baltaji 8		Pts: Baioraz 11

Umm Al-Hassam Hall, Manama
Referees: Kim (KOR), Sheng (MAS)

24 October
15:35

Kazakhstan	21–3	Bangladesh
Pts: Syzdykov 7		Pts: Rahman 2

Umm Al-Hassam Hall, Manama
Referees: Yin (MAS), Cong (CHN)

24 October
16:00

Iran	21–6	Saudi Arabia
Pts: Rashidi 8		Pts: Al-Shinkite 4

Umm Al-Hassam Hall, Manama
Referees: Li (CHN), Chen (TPE)

24 October
16:25

Sri Lanka	22–16	Yemen
Pts: Gerald 11		Pts: Al-Haithami, Ben Sumait 6

Umm Al-Hassam Hall, Manama
Referees: Laosaksam (THA), Su (TPE)

26 October
11:20

Bangladesh	6–21	Yemen
Pts: Rahman 3		Pts: Al-Yamani 8

Umm Al-Hassam Hall, Manama
Referees: Laosaksam (THA), Rulyov (KAZ)

26 October
11:45

Saudi Arabia	17–16	Sri Lanka
Pts: Baltaji 8		Pts: Gerald 7

Umm Al-Hassam Hall, Manama
Referees: Chen (TPE), Yin (MAS)

26 October
12:10

Kazakhstan	8–21	Iran
Pts: Baioraz 6		Pts: Azari 10

Umm Al-Hassam Hall, Manama
Referees: Nozaki (JPN), Li (CHN)

26 October
14:05

Iran	21–3	Bangladesh
Pts: Rashidi 11		Pts: Nehal, Afridy, Karim 1

Umm Al-Hassam Hall, Manama
Referees: Yin (MAS), Rulyov (KAZ)

26 October
14:30

Sri Lanka	19–20	Kazakhstan
Pts: Gerald 11		Pts: Bissenov 6

Umm Al-Hassam Hall, Manama
Referees: Nozaki (JPN), Laosaksam (THA)

26 October
15:10

Yemen	11–16	Saudi Arabia
Pts: Al-Haithami, Ben Sumait 5		Pts: Baltaji 9

Umm Al-Hassam Hall, Manama
Referees: Chen (TPE), Li (CHN)

==== Knockout round ====
Quarterfinals
27 October
Mongolia	21
Uzbekistan	14
27 October
Iran	20
China	21
27 October
Bahrain	20
Saudi Arabia	11
27 October
Qatar	21
Chinese Taipei	10

Semifinals
27 October
Mongolia	17
China	20
27 October
Bahrain	21
Qatar	10

Gold medal match
27 October
China	19
Bahrain	17
Bronze medal match
27 October
Mongolia	13
Qatar	18

===== Quarterfinals =====
27 October
11:50

Mongolia	21–14	Uzbekistan
Pts: Sükhbat 8		Pts: Khodjaev 7

Umm Al-Hassam Hall, Manama
Referees: Mohan (IND), Yin (MAS)

27 October
12:15

Iran	20–21	China
Pts: Rashidi 14		Pts: Yao 11

Umm Al-Hassam Hall, Manama
Referees: Nozaki (JPN), Mohan (IND)

27 October
13:45

Bahrain	20–11	Saudi Arabia
Pts: Meshael, Abdulkadir 6		Pts: Al-Dubaisi 5

Umm Al-Hassam Hall, Manama
Referees: Chen (TPE), Rulyov (KAZ)

27 October
14:10

Qatar	21–10	Chinese Taipei
Pts: Bedri 13		Pts: Lai 5

Umm Al-Hassam Hall, Manama
Referees: Rulyov (KAZ), Nozaki (JPN)

===== Semifinals =====
27 October
16:25

Mongolia	17–20	China
Pts: Sükhbat 11		Pts: Yao 14

Umm Al-Hassam Hall, Manama
Referees: Rulyov (KAZ), Yin (MAS)

27 October
16:50

Bahrain	21–10	Qatar
Pts: Meshael 11		Pts: Diop, Bedri 3

Umm Al-Hassam Hall, Manama
Referees: Li (CHN), Nozaki (JPN)

===== Bronze medal match =====
27 October
17:55

Mongolia	13–18	Qatar
Pts: Sükhbat 7		Pts: Bedri 8

Umm Al-Hassam Hall, Manama
Referees: Li (CHN), Mohan (IND)

===== Gold medal match =====
27 October
18:45

China	19–17	Bahrain
Pts: Yao 11		Pts: Abdulkadir 11

Umm Al-Hassam Hall, Manama
Referees: Rulyov (KAZ), Nozaki (JPN)

=== Girls ===
==== Preliminary round ====
===== Pool A =====
Pos	Team	Pld	W	L	PF	PA	PD	Pts
1	China	6	5	1	119	85	+34	10
2	Chinese Taipei	6	5	1	108	57	+51	10
3	Iran	6	5	1	108	54	+54	10
4	Kazakhstan	6	3	3	90	79	+11	6
5	Uzbekistan	6	2	4	80	84	−4	4
6	Jordan	6	1	5	64	104	−40	2
7	United Arab Emirates	6	0	6	17	123	−106	0

Source: FIBA

23 October
9:50

Kazakhstan	19–4	United Arab Emirates
Pts: Shin 8		Pts: four players 1

Umm Al-Hassam Hall, Manama
Referees: Chen (TPE), Mohan (IND)

23 October
10:15

Chinese Taipei	21–7	Jordan
Pts: Chen 9		Pts: Habash, Halaseh 3

Umm Al-Hassam Hall, Manama
Referees: Laosaksam (THA), Mohan (IND)

23 October
10:40

Iran	22–6	Uzbekistan
Pts: Ahmadian 8		Pts: Tokhtabaeva 4

Umm Al-Hassam Hall, Manama
Referees: Yin (MAS), Chen (TPE)

23 October
12:10

China	19–18 (OT)	Kazakhstan
Pts: Liu 7		Pts: Mekshun 6

Umm Al-Hassam Hall, Manama
Referees: Yin (MAS), Laosaksam (THA)

23 October
12:35

Jordan	6–21	Iran
Pts: Habash 4		Pts: Evini 9

Umm Al-Hassam Hall, Manama
Referees: Li (CHN), Chen (TPE)

23 October
13:00

United Arab Emirates	3–21	Chinese Taipei
Pts: Al-Naqbi, Al-Musharrekh, Al-Maazmi 1		Pts: Chen 8

Umm Al-Hassam Hall, Manama
Referees: Laosaksam (THA), Rulyov (KAZ)

23 October
15:35

Uzbekistan	17–12	Jordan
Pts: Salimova 14		Pts: Obeidat 7

Umm Al-Hassam Hall, Manama
Referees: Sheng (MAS), Mönkhchuluun (MGL)

23 October
16:25

Chinese Taipei	21–17	China
Pts: Chen 12		Pts: Xu 13

Umm Al-Hassam Hall, Manama
Referees: Nozaki (JPN), Kim (KOR)

23 October
18:20

United Arab Emirates	2–20	Uzbekistan
Pts: Al-Maazmi 2		Pts: Salimova 8

Umm Al-Hassam Hall, Manama
Referees: Mönkhchuluun (MGL), Cong (CHN)

23 October
18:45

China	20–13	Iran
Pts: Zhang, Liu 6		Pts: Khazaei 6

Umm Al-Hassam Hall, Manama
Referees: Sheng (MAS), Kim (KOR)

23 October
19:10

Kazakhstan	9–21	Chinese Taipei
Pts: Mekshun 6		Pts: Wu 11

Umm Al-Hassam Hall, Manama
Referees: Mönkhchuluun (MGL), Nozaki (JPN)

25 October
10:05

Iran	21–3	United Arab Emirates
Pts: Khazaei, Ahmadian, Bereihi 6		Pts: Al-Naqbi 2

Umm Al-Hassam Hall, Manama
Referees: Cong (CHN), Mönkhchuluun (MGL)

25 October
11:20

Iran	21–10	Kazakhstan
Pts: Khazaei 8		Pts: Nurbolatkyzy 6

Umm Al-Hassam Hall, Manama
Referees: Su (TPE), Mohan (IND)

25 October
11:45

Uzbekistan	18–21	China
Pts: Tokhtabaeva 9		Pts: Liu 8

Umm Al-Hassam Hall, Manama
Referees: Laosaksam (THA), Sheng (MAS)

25 October
12:10

Jordan	22–3	United Arab Emirates
Pts: Obeidat 11		Pts: Al-Musharrekh 2

Umm Al-Hassam Hall, Manama
Referees: Cong (CHN), Laosaksam (THA)

25 October
13:40

Chinese Taipei	9–11	Iran
Pts: Chiao 6		Pts: Evini 4

Umm Al-Hassam Hall, Manama
Referees: Mohan (IND), Laosaksam (THA)

25 October
14:05

Kazakhstan	13–9	Uzbekistan
Pts: Mekshun 6		Pts: Gadaeva 5

Umm Al-Hassam Hall, Manama
Referees: Su (TPE), Cong (CHN)

25 October
14:30

China	21–13	Jordan
Pts: Zhang, Chen 8		Pts: Nabulsi, Obeidat 5

Umm Al-Hassam Hall, Manama
Referees: Mönkhchuluun (MGL), Sheng (MAS)

25 October
17:05

Uzbekistan	10–15	Chinese Taipei
Pts: Tokhtabaeva 4		Pts: Chiao 6

Umm Al-Hassam Hall, Manama
Referees: Yin (MAS), Nozaki (JPN)

25 October
17:30

Jordan	5–21	Kazakhstan
Pts: Habash 3		Pts: Nurbolatkyzy, Mekshun 7

Umm Al-Hassam Hall, Manama
Referees: Li (CHN), Chen (TPE)

25 October
17:55

United Arab Emirates	2–21	China
Pts: Al-Maaz, Al-Musharrekh 1		Pts: Xu 7

Umm Al-Hassam Hall, Manama
Referees: Kim (KOR), Rulyov (KAZ)

===== Pool B =====
Pos	Team	Pld	W	L	PF	PA	PD	Pts
1	Thailand	6	6	0	117	50	+67	12
2	India	6	5	1	111	71	+40	10
3	Indonesia	6	4	2	92	75	+17	8
4	Sri Lanka	6	3	3	83	94	−11	6
5	Mongolia	6	2	4	74	93	−19	4
6	Maldives	6	1	5	65	101	−36	2
7	Palestine	6	0	6	57	115	−58	0

Source: FIBA

24 October
11:20

Indonesia	16–12	Palestine
Pts: Krisabella 7		Pts: Abujuma 7

Umm Al-Hassam Hall, Manama
Referees: Mohan (IND), Mönkhchuluun (MGL)

24 October
11:45

Thailand	21–5	Maldives
Pts: Udomchoksakul 10		Pts: Zakariya 3

Umm Al-Hassam Hall, Manama
Referees: Sheng (MAS), Rulyov (KAZ)

24 October
12:10

Sri Lanka	6–21	India
Pts: Perera 3		Pts: Reddy 9

Umm Al-Hassam Hall, Manama
Referees: Nozaki (JPN), Kim (KOR)

24 October
14:05

Mongolia	7–17	Indonesia
Pts: Enkhbilig, Emüjin, Undral 2		Pts: Krisabella, Celesta 5

Umm Al-Hassam Hall, Manama
Referees: Mohan (IND), Nozaki (JPN)

24 October
14:30

Maldives	14–19	Sri Lanka
Pts: Shirhan 9		Pts: Ransadhi 9

Umm Al-Hassam Hall, Manama
Referees: Sheng (MAS), Mönkhchuluun (MGL)

24 October
14:55

Palestine	7–21	Thailand
Pts: Abujuma 4		Pts: Bamroechit 8

Umm Al-Hassam Hall, Manama
Referees: Kim (KOR), Rulyov (KAZ)

24 October
16:50

India	21–14	Maldives
Pts: Reddy 12		Pts: Shirhan 8

Umm Al-Hassam Hall, Manama
Referees: Yin (MAS), Laosaksam (THA)

24 October
17:15

Sri Lanka	20–14	Palestine
Pts: Ransadhi 8		Pts: Abujuma 7

Umm Al-Hassam Hall, Manama
Referees: Cong (CHN), Chen (TPE)

24 October
17:55

Thailand	21–10	Mongolia
Pts: Udomchoksakul 10		Pts: Enkhbilig, Emüjin, Undral 3

Umm Al-Hassam Hall, Manama
Referees: Su (TPE), Li (CHN)

24 October
18:45

Palestine	6–21	India
Pts: Musleh 3		Pts: Sharma 6

Umm Al-Hassam Hall, Manama
Referees: Laosaksam (THA), Li (CHN)

24 October
19:10

Mongolia	10–14	Sri Lanka
Pts: Emüjin 5		Pts: Chandrasekara, Ransadhi 6

Umm Al-Hassam Hall, Manama
Referees: Cong (CHN), Su (TPE)

24 October
19:50

Indonesia	6–21	Thailand
Pts: Krisabella 5		Pts: Bamroechit 9

Umm Al-Hassam Hall, Manama
Referees: Chen (TPE), Yin (MAS)

26 October
12:50

Sri Lanka	11–17	Indonesia
Pts: Ransadhi 7		Pts: Welly 9

Umm Al-Hassam Hall, Manama
Referees: Yin (MAS), Nozaki (JPN)

26 October
13:15

India	21–15	Mongolia
Pts: Reddy 8		Pts: Enkhbilig 7

Umm Al-Hassam Hall, Manama
Referees: Rulyov (KAZ), Li (CHN)

26 October
13:40

Maldives	16–8	Palestine
Pts: Shirhan 10		Pts: Musleh 4

Umm Al-Hassam Hall, Manama
Referees: Laosaksam (THA), Chen (TPE)

26 October
15:35

Thailand	18–13	Sri Lanka
Pts: Udomchoksakul 9		Pts: Ransadhi 9

Umm Al-Hassam Hall, Manama
Referees: Mohan (IND), Mönkhchuluun (MGL)

26 October
16:00

Indonesia	15–18	India
Pts: Welly 7		Pts: Kulkarni 8

Umm Al-Hassam Hall, Manama
Referees: Kim (KOR), Su (TPE)

26 October
16:25

Mongolia	11–10	Maldives
Pts: Emüjin 4		Pts: Shirhan 7

Umm Al-Hassam Hall, Manama
Referees: Sheng (MAS), Cong (CHN)

26 October
17:30

India	9–15	Thailand
Pts: Birudavolu 4		Pts: Udomchoksakul 7

Umm Al-Hassam Hall, Manama
Referees: Su (TPE), Kim (KOR)

26 October
17:55

Maldives	6–21	Indonesia
Pts: Shirhan 5		Pts: Celesta 10

Umm Al-Hassam Hall, Manama
Referees: Cong (CHN), Mönkhchuluun (MGL)

26 October
18:35

Palestine	10–21	Mongolia
Pts: Joha, Abujuma 4		Pts: Enkhbilig 8

Umm Al-Hassam Hall, Manama
Referees: Kim (KOR), Sheng (MAS)

==== Knockout round ====
Quarterfinals
27 October
China	18
Sri Lanka	9
27 October
India	10
Iran	15
27 October
Chinese Taipei	20
Indonesia	12
27 October
Thailand	18
Kazakhstan	10

Semifinals
27 October
China	19
Iran	21
27 October
Chinese Taipei	20
Thailand	11

Gold medal match
27 October
Iran	14
Chinese Taipei (OT)	15
Bronze medal match
27 October
China	21
Thailand	12

===== Quarterfinals =====
27 October
11:00

China	18–9	Sri Lanka
Pts: Xu 10		Pts: Ransadhi 8

Umm Al-Hassam Hall, Manama
Referees: Sheng (MAS), Laosaksam (THA)

27 October
11:25

India	10–15	Iran
Pts: Reddy 5		Pts: Ahmadian, Bereihi 5

Umm Al-Hassam Hall, Manama
Referees: Su (TPE), Mönkhchuluun (MGL)

27 October
12:55

Chinese Taipei	20–12	Indonesia
Pts: Wu 7		Pts: Welly 5

Umm Al-Hassam Hall, Manama
Referees: Laosaksam (THA), Kim (KOR)

27 October
13:20

Thailand	18–10	Kazakhstan
Pts: Boonsub 7		Pts: Mekshun, Bazarbaikyzy 3

Umm Al-Hassam Hall, Manama
Referees: Cong (CHN), Kim (KOR)

===== Semifinals =====
27 October
15:35

China	19–21	Iran
Pts: Liu 8		Pts: Khazaei 9

Umm Al-Hassam Hall, Manama
Referees: Laosaksam (THA), Mönkhchuluun (MGL)

27 October
16:00

Chinese Taipei	20–11	Thailand
Pts: Chen, Hsieh, Chiao 6		Pts: Udomchoksakul, Bamroechit 4

Umm Al-Hassam Hall, Manama
Referees: Kim (KOR), Sheng (MAS)

===== Bronze medal match =====
27 October
17:30

China	21–12	Thailand
Pts: Liu, Xu 6		Pts: Bamroechit 6

Umm Al-Hassam Hall, Manama
Referees: Kim (KOR), Sheng (MAS)

===== Gold medal match =====
27 October
18:20

Iran	14–15 (OT)	Chinese Taipei
Pts: Khazaei 6		Pts: Chiao 8

Umm Al-Hassam Hall, Manama
Referees: Mönkhchuluun (MGL), Laosaksam (THA)
