= 2013 FIBA Asia 3x3 Under-18 Championship =

International youth basketball competition

- 1st FIBA Asia 3x3 Under-18 Championship

Tournament details
- Host nation: Thailand
- Dates: 22-24 May
- Teams: B:19; G:16
- Champions: Philippines (Boys); Taiwan (Girls)

The 2013 FIBA Asia Under-18 3x3 Championship for Boys and Girls is the first edition of the FIBA Asia's 3x3 championship for boys and girls under the age of 18. The games were held at Bangkok, Thailand from 22 May to 24 May 2013. The Philippines and Taiwan clinched the inaugural FIBA Asia 3×3 Under-18 Championship for Boys and Girls, respectively.

== Boys ==
=== Preliminary round ===
==== Group A ====
Team	Pld	W	L	PF	PA	Pts
China	3	3	0	63	24	6
India	3	2	1	47	36	5
Thailand-1	3	1	2	45	42	4
Maldives	3	0	3	12	61	3

	CHN	IND	THA	MDV
China		21–8	21–12	21–4
India	8–21		18–14	21-1
Thailand-1	12-21	19-7		14-18
Maldives	4–21	1-21	7–19	

==== Group B ====
Team	Pld	W	L	PF	PA	Pts
Philippines	4	3	1	72	56	7
Syria	4	3	1	55	57	7
Chinese Taipei	4	2	2	68	59	6
Qatar	4	2	2	68	58	6
Indonesia	4	0	4	56	69	4

	PHI	SYR	TPE	QAT	INA
Philippines		17-13	18-20	20-18	20-13
Syria	13-17		10-16	18-14	16-14
Chinese Taipei	18-20	16-10		14–17	16-15
Qatar	12–15	10-16	14–18		17–14
Indonesia	13-20	14–16	15-16	8-17	

==== Group C ====
Team	Pld	W	L	PF	PA	Pts
Hong Kong	4	4	0	71	50	8
Japan	4	3	1	66	67	7
Malaysia	4	2	2	70	59	6
Kazakhstan	4	1	3	48	58	5
Vietnam	4	0	4	46	67	4

	HKG	JPN	MAL	KAZ	VIE
Hong Kong		21-15	17-15	16-13	17-7
Japan	15–21		18-15	15-14	18-17
Malaysia	15-17	15-18		19-10	21-14
Kazakhstan	13–16	14–15	10-19		11-8
Vietnam	7-17	17-18	14-21	8-11	

==== Group D ====
Team	Pld	W	L	PF	PA	Pts
Lebanon	4	4	0	78	57	8
Thailand	4	3	1	78	40	7
Nepal	4	2	2	52	66	6
Sri Lanka	4	1	3	49	65	5
Macau	4	0	4	39	68	4

	LEB	THA	NEP	SRL	MAC
Lebanon		18-15	21-18	21-11	18-13
Thailand	15-18		21-8	21-10	21-4
Nepal	18-21	8-21		13-12	13-12
Sri Lanka	11-21	10-21	12-13		16-10
Macau	13-18	4-21	12-13	10-16	

=== Knockout round ===
Quarterfinals
China	15
Thailand	6
Philippines	21
Japan	18
India	21
Lebanon	7
Syria	19
Hong Kong	8

Semifinals
China	18
Philippines	22
India	13
Syria	11

Final
Philippines	21
India	19
Bronze medal match
China	19
Syria	16

== Girls ==
=== Knockout round ===
Quarterfinals
India	21
Indonesia	8
Philippines	10
Thailand	14
Thailand 1	5
China	17
Malaysia	5
Taiwan	12

Semifinals
India	20
Thailand	18
China	13
Taiwan	16

Final
India	13
Taiwan	21
Bronze medal match
Thailand	12
China	15
