= 3x3 basketball at the 2009 Asian Indoor Games =

- Venue: Lãnh Binh Thăng Gymnasium; University of Sport Pedagogy
- Dates: 31 October – 6 November 2009

3-on-3 basketball was contested at the 2009 Asian Indoor Games in Ho Chi Minh City, Vietnam from 31 October to 6 November.

== Medalists ==
Event	Gold	Silver	Bronze
Men	Iran; Mehdi Kamrani; Hamed Afagh; Oshin Sahakian; Samad Nikkhah Bahrami	Saudi Arabia; Faisal Al-Dawsari; Jaber Al-Kaabi; Ayman Al-Muwallad; Hani Al-Mohammed	Thailand; Chaiwat Kaedum; Kraiwit Wetwittayakit; Darongpan Apiromvilaichai; Pratya Kruatiwa
Women	Thailand; Juthathip Mathuros; Juthamas Jantakan; Charothai Suksomwong; Penphan Yothanan	India; Geethu Anna Jose; Anitha Pauldurai; Raspreet Sidhu; Prashanti Singh	Vietnam; Trần Thị Nguyệt Nga; Đào Thị Yến Ngọc; Nguyễn Thị Minh Cầm; Nguyễn Thị Ngọc Hà

== Medal table ==
Rank	Nation	Gold	Silver	Bronze	Total
1	Thailand (THA)	1	0	1	2
2	Iran (IRI)	1	0	0	1
3	India (IND)	0	1	0	1
3	Saudi Arabia (KSA)	0	1	0	1
5	Vietnam (VIE)	0	0	1	1
Totals (5 entries)		2	2	2	6

== Results ==
=== Men ===
==== Elimination ====
===== Group A =====
Pos	Team	Pld	W	L	PF	PA	PD	Pts
1	Thailand	5	5	0	170	114	+56	10
2	India	5	4	1	167	126	+41	9
3	Kuwait	5	3	2	157	123	+34	8
4	Jordan	5	2	3	156	125	+31	7
5	Nepal	5	1	4	78	163	−85	6
6	Qatar	5	0	5	90	167	−77	5

Source: Official website

31 October
16:45

Thailand	34–29	Jordan
Pts: Apiromvilaichai, Kruatiwa 13		Pts: Abuqoura 15

Lãnh Binh Thăng Gymnasium, Ho Chi Minh City

31 October
19:45

Qatar	16–34	India
Pts: El-Hadary 12		Pts: Koroth 22

Lãnh Binh Thăng Gymnasium, Ho Chi Minh City

31 October
20:30

Nepal	9–34	Kuwait
Pts: B. Maharjan 3		Pts: Al-Sarraf 21

Lãnh Binh Thăng Gymnasium, Ho Chi Minh City

1 November
18:00

Thailand	34–32	India
Pts: Kruatiwa 19		Pts: Bhriguvanshi 16

Lãnh Binh Thăng Gymnasium, Ho Chi Minh City

1 November
18:45

Nepal	11–33	Jordan
Pts: Pradhan 7		Pts: Zaghab 16

Lãnh Binh Thăng Gymnasium, Ho Chi Minh City

1 November
19:30

Qatar	18–33	Kuwait
Pts: El-Hadary 13		Pts: Al-Sarraf 12

Lãnh Binh Thăng Gymnasium, Ho Chi Minh City

2 November
19:30

Thailand	35–11	Nepal
Pts: Kaedum 12		Pts: Pradhan 6

Lãnh Binh Thăng Gymnasium, Ho Chi Minh City

2 November
20:15

Jordan	33–13	Qatar
Pts: Abuqoura 15		Pts: El-Hadary 9

Lãnh Binh Thăng Gymnasium, Ho Chi Minh City

2 November
21:00

Kuwait	30–34	India
Pts: Al-Muneer 12		Pts: Singh 13

Lãnh Binh Thăng Gymnasium, Ho Chi Minh City

3 November
18:00

Jordan	29–33	Kuwait
Pts: Zaghab 13		Pts: Al-Muneer 16

Lãnh Binh Thăng Gymnasium, Ho Chi Minh City

3 November
18:45

Thailand	34–15	Qatar
Pts: Kruatiwa 13		Pts: El-Hadary 9

Lãnh Binh Thăng Gymnasium, Ho Chi Minh City

3 November
19:30

Nepal	14–33	India
Pts: Joshi, Pradhan 6		Pts: Dinesh 11

Lãnh Binh Thăng Gymnasium, Ho Chi Minh City

4 November
19:30

Jordan	32–34	India
Pts: Zaghab 15		Pts: Bhriguvanshi 12

Lãnh Binh Thăng Gymnasium, Ho Chi Minh City

4 November
20:15

Thailand	33–27	Kuwait
Pts: Apiromvilaichai 13		Pts: Mohammad 11

Lãnh Binh Thăng Gymnasium, Ho Chi Minh City

4 November
21:00

Nepal	33–28	Qatar
Pts: B. Maharjan 17		Pts: Tawfeeq 13

Lãnh Binh Thăng Gymnasium, Ho Chi Minh City

===== Group B =====
Pos	Team	Pld	W	L	PF	PA	PD	Pts
1	Iran	4	4	0	132	57	+75	8
2	Saudi Arabia	4	3	1	122	89	+33	7
3	Vietnam	4	2	2	111	121	−10	6
4	Uzbekistan	4	1	3	97	118	−21	5
5	Afghanistan	4	0	4	57	134	−77	4

Source: Official website

31 October
16:00

Saudi Arabia	34–7	Afghanistan
Pts: Al-Muwallad 12		Pts: Arghandiwal 7

Lãnh Binh Thăng Gymnasium, Ho Chi Minh City

31 October
19:00

Uzbekistan	31–34	Vietnam
Pts: Kozlov 23		Pts: Chong 23

Lãnh Binh Thăng Gymnasium, Ho Chi Minh City

1 November
20:15

Iran	33–6	Afghanistan
Pts: Nikkhah 16		Pts: Sefatyar 4

Lãnh Binh Thăng Gymnasium, Ho Chi Minh City

1 November
21:00

Saudi Arabia	31–28	Vietnam
Pts: Al-Mohammed 14		Pts: Triệu 19

Lãnh Binh Thăng Gymnasium, Ho Chi Minh City

2 November
18:00

Iran	33–24	Saudi Arabia
Pts: Nikkhah 21		Pts: Al-Mohammed 15

Lãnh Binh Thăng Gymnasium, Ho Chi Minh City

2 November
18:45

Uzbekistan	34–18	Afghanistan
Pts: Kozlov 12		Pts: Arghandiwal 13

Lãnh Binh Thăng Gymnasium, Ho Chi Minh City

3 November
20:15

Iran	33–11	Uzbekistan
Pts: Nikkhah 19		Pts: Kozlov 5

Lãnh Binh Thăng Gymnasium, Ho Chi Minh City

3 November
21:00

Vietnam	33–26	Afghanistan
Pts: Chong 13		Pts: Arghandiwal 17

Lãnh Binh Thăng Gymnasium, Ho Chi Minh City

4 November
18:00

Uzbekistan	21–33	Saudi Arabia
Pts: Denisov 9		Pts: Al-Kaabi 14

Lãnh Binh Thăng Gymnasium, Ho Chi Minh City

4 November
18:45

Iran	33–16	Vietnam
Pts: Nikkhah 15		Pts: Chong 9

Lãnh Binh Thăng Gymnasium, Ho Chi Minh City

==== Knockout round ====
Semifinals
5 November
Thailand	28
Saudi Arabia	34
5 November
Iran	33
India	19

Final
6 November
Saudi Arabia	9
Iran	33
Bronze medal match
6 November
Thailand	35
India	27

===== Semifinals =====
5 November
19:30

Thailand	28–34	Saudi Arabia
Pts: Kruatiwa 15		Pts: Al-Mohammed 15

Lãnh Binh Thăng Gymnasium, Ho Chi Minh City

5 November
20:15

Iran	33–19	India
Pts: Nikkhah 23		Pts: Bhriguvanshi 11

Lãnh Binh Thăng Gymnasium, Ho Chi Minh City

===== Bronze medal match =====
6 November
19:00

Thailand	35–27	India
Pts: Apiromvilaichai 23		Pts: Bhriguvanshi 9

Lãnh Binh Thăng Gymnasium, Ho Chi Minh City

===== Final =====
6 November
19:45

Saudi Arabia	9–33	Iran
Pts: Al-Muwallad, Al-Mohammed 4		Pts: Nikkhah 19

Lãnh Binh Thăng Gymnasium, Ho Chi Minh City

=== Women ===
Pos	Team	Pld	W	L	PF	PA	PD	Pts
1	Thailand	4	4	0	133	87	+46	8
2	India	4	3	1	134	78	+56	7
3	Vietnam	4	2	2	102	99	+3	6
4	Jordan	4	1	3	103	102	+1	5
5	Kuwait	4	0	4	29	135	−106	4

Source: Official website

1 November
19:00

Kuwait	4–33	Vietnam
Pts: Khali 4		Pts: Nguyễn T.N. 16

University of Sport Pedagogy, Ho Chi Minh City

1 November
19:45

Jordan	22–34	India
Pts: D. Nasser 13		Pts: Jose 27

University of Sport Pedagogy, Ho Chi Minh City

2 November
19:00

Thailand	34–18	Jordan
Pts: Mathuros, Jantakan 12		Pts: Habash 9

University of Sport Pedagogy, Ho Chi Minh City

2 November
19:45

India	33–13	Vietnam
Pts: Jose 22		Pts: Nguyễn T.N. 6

University of Sport Pedagogy, Ho Chi Minh City

3 November
19:00

Thailand	33–32	India
Pts: Jantakan 13		Pts: Jose 16

University of Sport Pedagogy, Ho Chi Minh City

3 November
19:45

Jordan	34–0	Kuwait
Pts: D. Nasser 17		Pts: 0

University of Sport Pedagogy, Ho Chi Minh City

4 November
19:00

Kuwait	10–35	India
Pts: Al-Ammar 6		Pts: Jose 19

University of Sport Pedagogy, Ho Chi Minh City

4 November
19:45

Thailand	33–22	Vietnam
Pts: Jantakan 25		Pts: Nguyễn T.N. 14

University of Sport Pedagogy, Ho Chi Minh City

5 November
19:00

Jordan	29–34	Vietnam
Pts: Halasah 16		Pts: Trần 22

University of Sport Pedagogy, Ho Chi Minh City

5 November
20:00

Thailand	33–15	Kuwait
Pts: Suksomwong 15		Pts: Al-Ammar 9

University of Sport Pedagogy, Ho Chi Minh City
