= FIBA 3x3 U17 Asia Cup =

Youth basketball competition

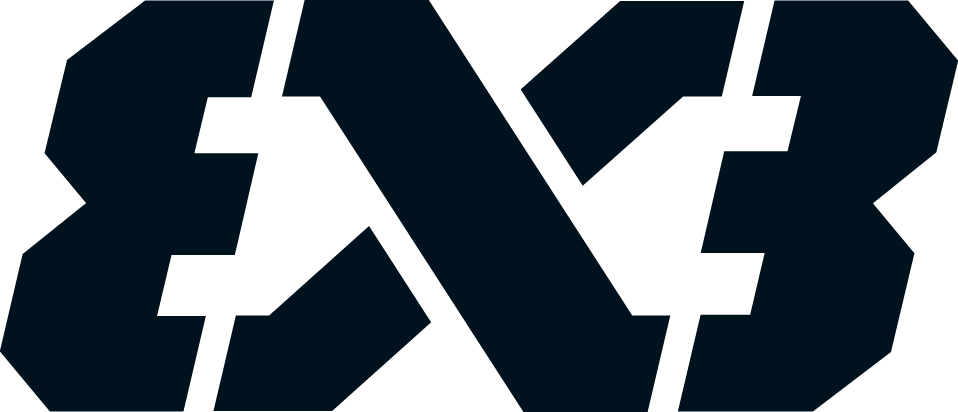
- Sport: 3x3 Basketball
- Founded: 2013
- First season: 2013
- Country: FIBA Asia member nations
- Continent: FIBA Asia (Asia)

The FIBA 3x3 U17 Asia Cup (or FIBA 3x3 U18 Asia Cup until 2022) for boys and girls is the Asian edition of the FIBA Asia's 3x3 championship for boys and girls under the age of 18. The first tournament games were held at Bangkok, Thailand from 22 May to 24 May 2013. The Philippines and Chinese Taipei clinched the inaugural FIBA Asia's 3x3 Under-18 Championship for Boys and Girls, respectively.

== Results ==
=== Boys ===
| Year | Host | Final | | | Third place game | | |
| Year | Host | Champion | Score | Second place | Third place | Score | Fourth place |
|---|---|---|---|---|---|---|---|
| 2013; Details | (Thailand); Bangkok | Philippines | 21–19 | India | China | 19–16 | Syria |
| 2016; Details | (Malaysia); Cyberjaya | Qatar | 21–9 | Philippines | Malaysia | 21–14 | Japan |
| 2017; Details | (Malaysia); Cyberjaya | China | 17–12 | Chinese Taipei | Qatar | 21–16 | Lebanon |
| 2018; Details | (Malaysia); Cyberjaya | New Zealand | 22–15 | China | Mongolia | 21–12 | Qatar |
| 2019; Details | (Malaysia); Cyberjaya | Japan | 21–13 | Kazakhstan | Australia | 21–17 | China |
| 2022; Details | (Malaysia); Kuala Lumpur | Japan | 21–17 | India | Mongolia | 21–18 | Chinese Taipei |

=== Girls ===
| Year | Host | Final | | | Third place game | | |
| Year | Host | Champion | Score | Second place | Third place | Score | Fourth place |
|---|---|---|---|---|---|---|---|
| 2013; Details | (Thailand); Bangkok | Chinese Taipei | 21–13 | India | China | 15–12 | Thailand |
| 2016; Details | (Malaysia); Cyberjaya | Japan | 20–16 | Kazakhstan | Malaysia | 16–7 | Singapore |
| 2017; Details | (Malaysia); Cyberjaya | Indonesia | 13–6 | Malaysia | China | 17–14 | Singapore |
| 2018; Details | (Malaysia); Cyberjaya | China | 19–12 | New Zealand | Indonesia | 15–11 | Hong Kong |
| 2019; Details | (Malaysia); Cyberjaya | Australia | 21–10 | Japan | Philippines | 14–11 | China |
| 2022; Details | (Malaysia); Kuala Lumpur | Japan | 21–7 | Malaysia | Chinese Taipei | 21–17 | Mongolia |

== Statistics ==
=== Medal table ===
| Rank | Nation | Gold | Silver | Bronze | Total |
|---|---|---|---|---|---|
| 1 | Japan | 4 | 1 | 0 | 5 |
| 2 | China | 2 | 1 | 3 | 6 |
| 3 | Chinese Taipei | 1 | 1 | 1 | 3 |
| 3 | Philippines | 1 | 1 | 1 | 3 |
| 5 | New Zealand | 1 | 1 | 0 | 2 |
| 6 | Australia | 1 | 0 | 1 | 2 |
| 6 | Indonesia | 1 | 0 | 1 | 2 |
| 6 | Qatar | 1 | 0 | 1 | 2 |
| 9 | India | 0 | 3 | 0 | 3 |
| 10 | Malaysia | 0 | 2 | 2 | 4 |
| 11 | Kazakhstan | 0 | 2 | 0 | 2 |
| 12 | Mongolia | 0 | 0 | 2 | 2 |
| Totals (12 entries) | | 12 | 12 | 12 | 36 |

== See also ==
- FIBA 3x3 Asia Cup
- FIBA 3x3 U18 World Cup
