= Iraq at the 2018 Asian Games =

- IOC code: IRQ
- NOC: National Olympic Committee of Iraq
- Website: www.nociraq.iq

in Jakarta and Palembang August 18 – September 2
- Competitors: 54 in 12 sports
- Medals Ranked 27th: Gold 1 Silver 2 Bronze 0 Total 3

Asian Games appearances (overview)
- 1974; 1978; 1982; 1986; 1990–2002; 2006; 2010; 2014; 2018; 2022; 2026

Iraq participated in the 2018 Asian Games in Jakarta and Palembang, Indonesia from 18 August to 2 September 2018. Iraq first competed at the Asian Games in 1974 Tehran, and the best achievement was in 1982 Delhi, when the country was ranked 11th with a total 9 medals, 2 gold, 3 silver, and 4 bronze medals. At the last edition in Incheon, Iraq had collected 4 medals, and was ranked 25th in medals tally.

== Medalists ==
The following Iraq competitors won medals at the Games.

Medal	Name	Sport	Event	Date
Gold	Safaa Rashed Al-Jumaili	Weightlifting	Men's 85 kg	25 Aug
Silver	Salwan Jassim	Weightlifting	Men's 105 kg	26 Aug
Silver	Mustafa Al-Saamah	Athletics	Discus throw	29 Aug

Medals by sport
Sport	1st place, gold medalist(s)	2nd place, silver medalist(s)	3rd place, bronze medalist(s)	Total
Weightlifting	1	1	0	2
Athletics	0	1	0	1
Total	1	2	0	3

Medals by day
Day	Date	1st place, gold medalist(s)	2nd place, silver medalist(s)	3rd place, bronze medalist(s)	Total
1	August 19	0	0	0	0
2	August 20	0	0	0	0
3	August 21	0	0	0	0
4	August 22	0	0	0	0
5	August 23	0	0	0	0
6	August 24	0	0	0	0
7	August 25	1	0	0	1
8	August 26	0	1	0	0
9	August 27	0	0	0	0
10	August 28	0	0	0	0
11	August 29	0	1	0	0
12	August 30	0	0	0	0
13	August 31	0	0	0	0
14	September 1	0	0	0	0
15	September 2	0	0	0	0
Total		1	2	0	3

== Competitors ==
The following is a list of the number of competitors representing Iraq that participated at the Games:

Sport	Men	Women	Total
Archery	1	1	2
Athletics	10	3	13
Basketball	4	0	4
Boxing	4	0	4
Canoeing	1	0	1
Handball	16	0	16
Ju-jitsu	2	0	2
Judo	3	0	3
Kurash	2	0	2
Rowing	1	0	1
Sambo	1	0	1
Weightlifting	4	1	5
Total	49	5	54

== Archery ==
Compound

Athlete	Event	Ranking round		Round of 32	Round of 16	Quarterfinals	Semifinals	Final / BM	
Athlete	Event	Score	Seed	Opposition score	Opposition score	Opposition score	Opposition score	Opposition score	Rank
Eshaq Al-Daghman; Fatimah Al-Mashhadani	Mixed team	1352	15	Bye	India; L 147–156	Did not advance			

== Athletics ==
Iraq entered thirteen athletes (10 men's and 3 women's) to participate in the athletics competition at the Games.

== Basketball ==
Summary

Team	Event	Group stage						Quarterfinal	Semifinals / Pl.	Final / BM / Pl.	
Team	Event	Opposition score	Opposition score	Opposition score	Opposition score	Opposition score	Rank	Opposition score	Opposition score	Opposition score	Rank
Iraq men's	Men's 3x3 tournament	Turkmenistan; W 16−14	Malaysia; W 19−16	Iran; L 16−19	Afghanistan; W 21−12	Kazakhstan; L 18−21	3	Did not advance			

=== 3x3 basketball ===
Iraq national 3x3 team participated in the Games, the men's team placed in pool D based on the FIBA 3x3 federation ranking.

==== Men's tournament ====
Roster

The following is the Iraq roster in the men's 3x3 basketball tournament of the 2018 Asian Games.

- Ihab Hasan Ibadi Al-Zuhairi
- Abbas Hikmat Abdulimam Alqarnawi
- Jasim Al-Saadi
- Abdullah Majeed Abdullah

Pool D

Pos	Team	Pld	W	L	PF	PA	PD	Qualification
1	Iran	5	5	0	99	56	+43	Quarterfinals
2	Kazakhstan	5	3 (Note: Head-to-head result: KAZ 21–18 IRQ.)	2	91	82	+9	Quarterfinals
3	Iraq	5	3	2	90	82	+8	
4	Malaysia	5	2 (Note: Head-to-head result: MAS 17–13 TKM.)	3	82	80	+2	
5	Turkmenistan	5	2	3	73	76	−3	
6	Afghanistan	5	0	5	47	106	−59	

Source: OCA
Notes:

22 August
17:30

Turkmenistan	14–16	Iraq
Pts: Mämmetmyradow 6		Pts: Hasan 10

Gelora Bung Karno Tennis Center Court, Jakarta
Referees: Liu (MAS), Lim (MAS)

22 August
20:30

Iraq	19–16	Malaysia
Pts: Hasan 11		Pts: Ting 8

Gelora Bung Karno Tennis Center Court, Jakarta
Referees: Tan (SGP), Ito (JPN)

25 August
15:00

Iran	19–16	Iraq
Pts: Allahverdi 7		Pts: Mohammed 6

Gelora Bung Karno Tennis Center Court, Jakarta
Referees: Ho (HKG), Shi (CHN)

25 August
16:20

Afghanistan	12–21	Iraq
Pts: Khairi 9		Pts: Hasan 10

Gelora Bung Karno Tennis Center Court, Jakarta
Referees: Ito (JPN), Quinn (INA)

25 August
17:30

Iraq	18–21	Kazakhstan
Pts: Hasan 9		Pts: Aitkali 13

Gelora Bung Karno Tennis Center Court, Jakarta
Referees: Shi (CHN), Quinn (INA)

== Boxing ==
Men

Athlete	Event	Round of 32	Round of 16	Quarterfinals	Semifinals	Final	Rank
Athlete	Event	Opposition Result	Opposition Result	Opposition Result	Opposition Result	Opposition Result	Rank
Hasan Ali Naser	–49 kg	Bye	MT Uulu (KGZ); L RSC	Did not advance			
Jaafar Al-Sudani	–56 kg	Mario Fernandez (PHI); W KO	A Vokhidov (TJK); W 3–2	SA Amoragam (INA); L 1–4	Did not advance		
Ammar Karbalai	–60 kg	Bye	E Tsendbaatar (MGL); L 0–5	Did not advance			
Karrar Aal Ezirej	–64 kg	M Berdibayev (TKM); W 5–0	Nguyễn VC (VIE); W 5–0	D Narimatsu (JPN); L 0–4	Did not advance		

== Canoeing ==
=== Sprint ===
Athlete	Event	Heats		Semifinal		Final	
Athlete	Event	Time	Rank	Time	Rank	Time	Rank
Ahmed Sameer Jumaah Faris	Men's K-1 200 m	38.865	4 QS	36.740	1 QF	37.380	8

Qualification legend: QF=Final; QS=Semifinal

== Handball ==
Iraq competed in the group D at the men's team event.

Summary

Key:

- ET – After extra time
- P – Match decided by penalty-shootout.

Team	Event	Preliminary	Standing	Main / Class.	Rank / standing	Semifinals / Pl.	Final / BM / Pl.	
Team	Event	Opposition score	Standing	Opposition score	Rank / standing	Opposition score	Opposition score	Rank
Iraq men's	Men's tournament	Group D Bahrain: L 24–30; Chinese Taipei: W 37–30; India: W 40–29	2 Q	Group I Qatar: L 20–26; Japan: L 24–27; Saudi Arabia: D 20–20	4	Did not advance	Hong Kong; W 31–24	7

=== Men's tournament ===
Roster

- Bilal Al-Sabbagh
- Raed Al Baghdadi
- Hussein Ibadi
- Jasim Mohammed
- Mintadher Ali
- Ahmed Al Azzawi
- Mohanad Al Behadili
- Ali Al Akayshee
- Majid Al-Akayshi
- Mohammed Rashid
- Karrar Al-Battat
- Maytham Al Behadili
- Mustafa Al Azzawi
- Ali Abdlkan
- Baderaldeen Naser
- Mohammed Al Azzawi

Group D

Pos	Team	Pld	W	D	L	GF	GA	GD	Pts	Qualification
1	Bahrain	3	3	0	0	99	70	+29	6	Main round / Group 1–2
2	Iraq	3	2	0	1	101	89	+12	4	Main round / Group 1–2
3	Chinese Taipei	3	1	0	2	89	102	−13	2	Main round / Group 3
4	India	3	0	0	3	82	110	−28	0	Main round / Group 3

Source: AHF

13 August; 14:00	Iraq	24–30	Bahrain	POPKI Sports Hall, Jakarta; Referees: Hizaki, Ikebuchi (JPN)
13 August; 14:00	Hammoudi 5	(16–12)	Al-Samahiji, Al-Sayyad 5	POPKI Sports Hall, Jakarta; Referees: Hizaki, Ikebuchi (JPN)
13 August; 14:00	1× (yellow card) 3× (suspension)		1× (yellow card) 4× (suspension)	POPKI Sports Hall, Jakarta; Referees: Hizaki, Ikebuchi (JPN)

15 August; 18:00	Iraq	37–30	Chinese Taipei	POPKI Sports Hall, Jakarta; Referees: Al-Marhoon, Al-Mawt (BHR)
15 August; 18:00	Adnan 10	(17–14)	Chao 8	POPKI Sports Hall, Jakarta; Referees: Al-Marhoon, Al-Mawt (BHR)
15 August; 18:00	2× (yellow card) 6× (suspension)		1× (yellow card) 5× (suspension) 1× (red card)	POPKI Sports Hall, Jakarta; Referees: Al-Marhoon, Al-Mawt (BHR)

17 August; 18:00	India	29–40	Iraq	POPKI Sports Hall, Jakarta; Referees: Al-Wahibi, Al-Shahi (OMA)
17 August; 18:00	Ahlawat 8	(13–18)	Adil 9	POPKI Sports Hall, Jakarta; Referees: Al-Wahibi, Al-Shahi (OMA)
17 August; 18:00	2× (yellow card) 5× (suspension)		3× (yellow card) 1× (suspension)	POPKI Sports Hall, Jakarta; Referees: Al-Wahibi, Al-Shahi (OMA)

Main round (Group I)

Pos	Team	Pld	W	D	L	GF	GA	GD	Pts	Qualification
1	Qatar	3	3	0	0	78	60	+18	6	Semifinals
2	Japan	3	1	1	1	70	74	−4	3	Semifinals
3	Saudi Arabia	3	0	2	1	69	74	−5	2	Classification 5th–6th
4	Iraq	3	0	1	2	64	73	−9	1	Classification 7th–8th

Source: AHF

20 August; 16:00	Iraq	20–26	Qatar	POPKI Sports Hall, Jakarta; Referees: Tavakkoli, Valadkhanian (IRI)
20 August; 16:00	Ghassab 5	(9–15)	Heiba, Zouaoui 5	POPKI Sports Hall, Jakarta; Referees: Tavakkoli, Valadkhanian (IRI)
20 August; 16:00	1× (yellow card) 2× (suspension)		2× (yellow card) 4× (suspension)	POPKI Sports Hall, Jakarta; Referees: Tavakkoli, Valadkhanian (IRI)

22 August; 16:00	Japan	27–24	Iraq	POPKI Sports Hall, Jakarta; Referees: Tavakkoli, Valadkhanian (IRI)
22 August; 16:00	Motoki 9	(12–15)	Adnan 5	POPKI Sports Hall, Jakarta; Referees: Tavakkoli, Valadkhanian (IRI)
22 August; 16:00	1× (yellow card) 2× (suspension)		3× (yellow card) 8× (suspension) 1× (red card)	POPKI Sports Hall, Jakarta; Referees: Tavakkoli, Valadkhanian (IRI)

24 August; 16:00	Iraq	20–20	Saudi Arabia	POPKI Sports Hall, Jakarta; Referees: Tavakkoli, Valadkhanian (IRI)
24 August; 16:00	Adnan 9	(11–12)	Al-Abbas, Al-Abdulali 5	POPKI Sports Hall, Jakarta; Referees: Tavakkoli, Valadkhanian (IRI)
24 August; 16:00	1× (yellow card) 4× (suspension)		2× (yellow card) 3× (suspension) 2× (red card)	POPKI Sports Hall, Jakarta; Referees: Tavakkoli, Valadkhanian (IRI)

Seventh place game

26 August; 16:00	Iraq	31–24	Hong Kong	POPKI Sports Hall, Jakarta; Referees: Lee, Koo (KOR)
26 August; 16:00	M. Abdul-Ridha 7	(15–12)	Ip S. 5	POPKI Sports Hall, Jakarta; Referees: Lee, Koo (KOR)
26 August; 16:00	1× (yellow card) 3× (suspension)		2× (yellow card) 2× (suspension)	POPKI Sports Hall, Jakarta; Referees: Lee, Koo (KOR)

== Ju-jitsu ==
Iraq entered the ju-jitsu competition with 2 men's athletes.

Key:

- ADV – Won by advantages.
- RDC – Won by referee decision.
- SUB – Won by submission.

Men

Athlete	Event	Round of 32	Round of 16	Quarterfinals	Semifinals	Repechage	Final / BM	Rank
Athlete	Event	Opposition Result	Opposition Result	Opposition Result	Opposition Result	Opposition Result	Opposition Result	Rank
Mohammed Al-Mashahedi	–56 kg	A Amirov (UZB); L 2–6	Did not advance					
Ali Al-Alabd	–69 kg	A Nabas (JOR); W 2^{ADV}–2	A Bozorov (UZB); W 2–0	B Lertthaisong (THA); L 0–0^{ADV}	Did not advance	J Hojamyradow (TKM); L 0–2	Did not advance	

== Judo ==
Iraq put up 3 athletes for Judo:

Key:

- 1st number — Ippon
- 2nd number — Waza-ari
- s — Shido

Men

Athlete	Event	Round of 32	Round of 16	Quarterfinals	Semifinals	Repechage	Final / BM	Rank
Athlete	Event	Opposition Result	Opposition Result	Opposition Result	Opposition Result	Opposition Result	Opposition Result	Rank
Mohammed Al-Saedi	–66 kg	Phan VN (VIE); W 01–00s1	A Te (KGZ); L 00–01	Did not advance				
Sajjad Sehen	–73 kg	Kim C-g (PRK); L 00s1–10	Did not advance					
Hadi Hadi	–81 kg	S Azar (LBN); WO	Did not advance					

== Kurash ==
Men

Athlete	Event	Round of 32	Round of 16	Quarterfinal	Semifinal	Final	
Athlete	Event	Opposition Score	Opposition Score	Opposition Score	Opposition Score	Opposition Score	Rank
Mugtaba Ahmed	–81 kg	Z Sultan (KAZ); L 011−112	Did not advance				
Mahmood Ridha	+90 kg	AB Rahmani (AFG); L 000−101	Did not advance				

== Rowing ==
Men

Athlete	Event	Heats		Repechage		Final	
Athlete	Event	Time	Rank	Time	Rank	Time	Rank
Mohammed Riyadh	Lightweight single sculls	7:44.80	4 R	8:16.14	2 FA	7:31.40	6

== Sambo ==
Key:

- SU – Won by submission.

Athlete	Event	Round of 32	Round of 16	Quarterfinal	Semifinal	Repechage 1	Repechage 2	Repechage final	Final / BM	
Athlete	Event	Opposition Result	Opposition Result	Opposition Result	Opposition Result	Opposition Result	Opposition Result	Opposition Result	Opposition Result	Rank
Jasim Qaddoori	Men's 90 kg	Bye	RA Bahari (INA); L 2–3	Did not advance						

== Weightlifting ==
Safaa Rashed Al-Jumaili secured Iraq's first medal at the Games, by winning the gold in the 85 kg with a total 361 kg lifts.

Men

Athlete	Event	Snatch		Clean & jerk		Total	Rank
Athlete	Event	Result	Rank	Result	Rank	Total	Rank
Ali Mohammed Ridha Ali	−69 kg	140	9	161	12	301	11
Ahmed Al-Hussein	−77 kg	146	6	~~189~~	—	—	—
Safaa Al-Jumaili	−85 kg	159	2	202	1	361	1st place, gold medalist(s)
Salwan Jassim	−105 kg	181	3	224	2	405	2nd place, silver medalist(s)

Women

Athlete	Event	Snatch		Clean & jerk		Total	Rank
Athlete	Event	Result	Rank	Result	Rank	Total	Rank
Huda Salim Al-Saedi	−75 kg	95	6	112	7	207	7
