= 3x3 basketball at the 2007 Asian Indoor Games =

- Venue: IPM Multisport Pavilion
- Dates: 3 November 2007

3 on 3 basketball was a demonstration sport at the 2007 Asian Indoor Games was held in Macau, China on 3 November 2007. The competition was the first major test of FIBA 3x3, a formalized version of the basketball variant developed earlier that year by the sport's international governing body, FIBA.

== Medalists ==
Event	Gold	Silver	Bronze
Men	Iran; Arsalan Kazemi; Farbod Farman; Mehdi Shirjang; Mohammad Amjad	China	Hong Kong; Chow Kin Wan; Lau Hoi To; Yan Siu Chun; Lau Tsz Lai

== Results ==
=== Preliminary round ===
==== Group A ====
Pos	Team	Pld	W	L	PF	PA	PD	Pts
1	China	3	3	0	65	38	+27	6
2	Hong Kong	3	2	1	48	58	−10	5
3	India	3	1	2	55	57	−2	4
4	Macau	3	0	3	49	64	−15	3

Source: Official website

3 November

Hong Kong	21–16	India

IPM Multisport Pavilion, Macau

3 November

China	22–14	Macau

IPM Multisport Pavilion, Macau

3 November

Hong Kong	6–22	China

IPM Multisport Pavilion, Macau

3 November

India	21–15	Macau

IPM Multisport Pavilion, Macau

3 November

Macau	20–21	Hong Kong

IPM Multisport Pavilion, Macau

3 November

China	21–18	India

IPM Multisport Pavilion, Macau

==== Group B ====
Pos	Team	Pld	W	L	PF	PA	PD	Pts
1	Iran	3	3	0	63	33	+30	6
2	Philippines	3	2	1	54	38	+16	5
3	Chinese Taipei	3	1	2	47	50	−3	4
4	Malaysia	3	0	3	20	63	−43	3

Source: Official website

3 November

Iran	21–13	Chinese Taipei

IPM Multisport Pavilion, Macau

3 November

Malaysia	4–21	Philippines

IPM Multisport Pavilion, Macau

3 November

Philippines	12–21	Iran

IPM Multisport Pavilion, Macau

3 November

Chinese Taipei	21–8	Malaysia

IPM Multisport Pavilion, Macau

3 November

Malaysia	8–21	Iran

IPM Multisport Pavilion, Macau

3 November

Chinese Taipei	13–21	Philippines

IPM Multisport Pavilion, Macau

=== Final round ===
==== 3rd place match ====
3 November

Hong Kong	33–30	Philippines

IPM Multisport Pavilion, Macau

==== Final ====
3 November

China	28–33	Iran

IPM Multisport Pavilion, Macau
