= 3x3 basketball at the 2018 Asian Games – Men's tournament =

Asian Games competition

Men at the 2018 Asian Games
- Venue: Gelora Bung Karno Tennis Center Court
- Date: 21–26 August 2018
- Competitors: 83 from 22 nations

Medalists
gold medal	China
silver medal	South Korea
bronze medal	Iran

The men's 3-on-3 basketball tournament at the 2018 Asian Games was held at the Gelora Bung Karno Tennis Center Court, Jakarta, Indonesia from 21 to 26 August 2018. Teams were restricted to under-23 players.

== Squads ==
Afghanistan	Bangladesh	China	Chinese Taipei
Mir Abdul Wahab Mirzad; Sayed Amin Sadat; Jahan Zeeb Khairi	Intishar Mostafa Chowdhury; Md Shahanur Rahman; Sajid Istiaque; Mahfuzul Haque	Chen Gong; Xiao Hailiang; Huang Wenwei; Zeng Bingqiang	Chou Wei-chen; Chu Yun-hao; Chien You-che; Tseng Hsiang-chun
Indonesia	Iran	Iraq	Japan
Rivaldo Tandra Pangesthio; Erick Jonathan Gosal; Agassi Goantara; Vincent Rivaldi Kosasih	Ali Allahverdi; Amir Hossein Azari; Navid Khajehzadeh; Mohammad Yousefvand	Ihab Hasan; Abbas Hikmat; Jasim Mohammed; Abdullah Majeed	Tensho Sugimoto; Yoshiyuki Matsuwaki; Hayate Arakawa; Yasuki Miyakoshi
Jordan	Kazakhstan	Kyrgyzstan	Malaysia
Rayyan Jarrad; Hanna Juha; Omar Bukhari; Shaker Shubair	Anuar Shakirov; Vassiliy Belozor; Andrey Litvinenko; Ruslan Aitkali	Omurbek Atabekov; Sherzat Kenenov; Artem Mushtruev; Roman Demchenko	Heng Yee Tong; Wong Yi Hou; Anthony Liew; Ting Chun Hong
Maldives	Mongolia	Nepal	Qatar
Maldives withdrew from the competition.	Pürevsürengiin Mönkh-Orgil; Chuluunbaataryn Ikhbayar; Ariunbaataryn Sükhbat; Onolbaataryn Enkhbaatar	Nischal Maharjan; Mabindra Bhandari; Ajay Kushwaha; Ashish Basnet	Seydou Ndoye; Moustafa Essam Fouda; Babacar Dieng; Nedim Muslić
South Korea	Sri Lanka	Syria	Thailand
An Young-jun; Kim Nak-hyeon; Park In-tae; Yang Hong-seok	Arnold Brent; Pawan Gamage; Chanuka Fernando; Kisal Cooray	Khalil Khouri; Ahmad Khyyata; Omar Idelbi; Ammar Al-Ghamian	Guntapong Korsah-dick; Chanatip Jakrawan; Chatpol Chungyampin; Nithipol Sawathavorn
Turkmenistan	Vietnam		
Kerim Mämmetmyradow; Ahmet Kiýathanow; Alihan Bekçanow; Merdan Hojamedow	Nguyễn Quang Huy; Huỳnh Vĩnh Quang; Triệu Hùng Minh; Nguyễn Lâm Anh Duy		

== Results ==
All times are Western Indonesia Time (UTC+07:00)

=== Preliminary ===
==== Pool A ====
Pos	Team	Pld	W	L	PF	PA	PD	Qualification
1	China	4	4	0	86	49	+37	Quarterfinals
2	Thailand	4	3	1	74	53	+21	Quarterfinals
3	Indonesia	4	2	2	67	59	+8	
4	Sri Lanka	4	1	3	57	66	−9	
5	Vietnam	4	0	4	28	85	−57	

Source: OCA

21 August
15:00

China	21–14	Sri Lanka
Pts: Zeng 9		Pts: Brent 6

Gelora Bung Karno Tennis Center Court, Jakarta
Referees: Ito (JPN), Rulyov (KAZ)

21 August
15:20

Vietnam	8–21	Indonesia
Pts: Nguyễn Q. 4		Pts: Kosasih 7

Gelora Bung Karno Tennis Center Court, Jakarta
Referees: Liu (MAS), Tan (SGP)

21 August
16:00

Thailand	20–10	Sri Lanka
Pts: Jakrawan, Chungyampin 8		Pts: Brent 4

Gelora Bung Karno Tennis Center Court, Jakarta
Referees: Tan (SGP), Ito (JPN)

21 August
16:30

Vietnam	6–22	China
Pts: Nguyễn Q. 3		Pts: Xiao 12

Gelora Bung Karno Tennis Center Court, Jakarta
Referees: Liu (MAS), Tan (SGP)

21 August
18:20

Indonesia	15–17	Thailand
Pts: Pangesthio 5		Pts: Jakrawan 7

Gelora Bung Karno Tennis Center Court, Jakarta
Referees: Ho (HKG), Ibragimow (TKM)

24 August
17:10

Thailand	21–7	Vietnam
Pts: Korsah-dick 12		Pts: Triệu 3

Gelora Bung Karno Tennis Center Court, Jakarta
Referees: Lim (MAS), Liu (MAS)

24 August
17:50

Sri Lanka	21–7	Vietnam
Pts: Brent 20		Pts: Triệu 4

Gelora Bung Karno Tennis Center Court, Jakarta
Referees: Ibragimow (TKM), Al-Harthi (OMA)

24 August
18:10

Indonesia	13–22	China
Pts: Gosal, Goantara, Kosasih 4		Pts: Xiao 10

Gelora Bung Karno Tennis Center Court, Jakarta
Referees: Ito (JPN), Rulyov (KAZ)

24 August
19:20

Sri Lanka	12–18	Indonesia
Pts: Brent 7		Pts: Goantara 6

Gelora Bung Karno Tennis Center Court, Jakarta
Referees: Tan (SGP), Rulyov (KAZ)

24 August
19:40

China	21–16	Thailand
Pts: Zeng 6		Pts: Sawathavorn 7

Gelora Bung Karno Tennis Center Court, Jakarta
Referees: Ito (JPN), Ibragimow (TKM)

==== Pool B ====
Pos	Team	Pld	W	L	PF	PA	PD	Qualification
1	South Korea	4	4	0	83	46	+37	Quarterfinals
2	Chinese Taipei	4	3	1	79	50	+29	Quarterfinals
3	Mongolia	4	2	2	63	68	−5	
4	Kyrgyzstan	4	1	3	44	71	−27	
5	Bangladesh	4	0	4	35	69	−34	

Source: OCA

22 August
15:00

Kyrgyzstan	10–7	Bangladesh
Pts: Demchenko 5		Pts: Chowdhury 4

Gelora Bung Karno Tennis Center Court, Jakarta
Referees: Quinn (INA), Ibragimow (TKM)

22 August
15:20

Mongolia	15–19	Chinese Taipei
Pts: Mönkh-Orgil 9		Pts: Chou 6

Gelora Bung Karno Tennis Center Court, Jakarta
Referees: Liu (MAS), Rulyov (KAZ)

22 August
16:00

Kyrgyzstan	12–21	South Korea
Pts: Mushtruev 4		Pts: Yang 8

Gelora Bung Karno Tennis Center Court, Jakarta
Referees: Rulyov (KAZ), Liu (MAS)

22 August
16:30

Bangladesh	13–17	Mongolia
Pts: Rahman 5		Pts: Mönkh-Orgil, Enkhbaatar 6

Gelora Bung Karno Tennis Center Court, Jakarta
Referees: Quinn (INA), Ibragimow (TKM)

22 August
17:10

South Korea	20–18	Chinese Taipei
Pts: An 9		Pts: Chu 11

Gelora Bung Karno Tennis Center Court, Jakarta
Referees: Rulyov (KAZ), Ibragimow (TKM)

25 August
17:50

Chinese Taipei	21–8	Bangladesh
Pts: Chu 7		Pts: Rahman 5

Gelora Bung Karno Tennis Center Court, Jakarta
Referees: Tan (SGP), Ito (JPN)

25 August
19:00

Mongolia	22–15	Kyrgyzstan
Pts: Enkhbaatar 9		Pts: Mushtruev 6

Gelora Bung Karno Tennis Center Court, Jakarta
Referees: Lim (MAS), Ibragimow (TKM)

25 August
19:20

Bangladesh	7–21	South Korea
Pts: Rahman 6		Pts: An 12

Gelora Bung Karno Tennis Center Court, Jakarta
Referees: Ibragimow (TKM), Rulyov (KAZ)

25 August
20:10

Chinese Taipei	21–7	Kyrgyzstan
Pts: Chou 7		Pts: Atabekov, Demchenko 3

Gelora Bung Karno Tennis Center Court, Jakarta
Referees: Ibragimow (TKM), Al-Harthi (OMA)

25 August
20:30

South Korea	21–9	Mongolia
Pts: An 9		Pts: Mönkh-Orgil 6

Gelora Bung Karno Tennis Center Court, Jakarta
Referees: Liu (MAS), Rulyov (KAZ)

==== Pool C ====
Pos	Team	Pld	W	L	PF	PA	PD	Qualification
1	Japan	5	5	0	86	46	+40	Quarterfinals
2	Qatar	5	4	1	74	43	+31	Quarterfinals
3	Syria	5	3	2	62	76	−14	
4	Nepal	5	2	3	59	74	−15	
5	Jordan	5	1	4	43	85	−42	
—	Maldives	5	0	5	0	0	0	

Source: OCA

21 August
17:10

Japan	22–11	Nepal
Pts: Matsuwaki 11		Pts: Maharjan, Bhandari 4

Gelora Bung Karno Tennis Center Court, Jakarta
Referees: Rulyov (KAZ), Al-Harthi (OMA)

21 August
17:30

Qatar	vs.	Maldives
Forfeit

Gelora Bung Karno Tennis Center Court, Jakarta

21 August
17:30

Jordan	19–21	Syria
Pts: Juha 7		Pts: Khouri 8

Gelora Bung Karno Tennis Center Court, Jakarta
Referees: Shi (CHN), Quinn (INA)

21 August
18:40

Nepal	8–21	Qatar
Pts: Maharjan 4		Pts: Dieng, Muslić 8

Gelora Bung Karno Tennis Center Court, Jakarta
Referees: Quinn (INA), Shi (CHN)

21 August
19:20

Jordan	7–22	Japan
Pts: Juha 5		Pts: Arakawa 10

Gelora Bung Karno Tennis Center Court, Jakarta
Referees: Ho (HKG), Lim (MAS)

21 August
19:40

Syria	vs.	Maldives
Forfeit

Gelora Bung Karno Tennis Center Court, Jakarta

21 August
19:40

Qatar	17–7	Syria
Pts: Dieng 6		Pts: Idelbi 3

Gelora Bung Karno Tennis Center Court, Jakarta
Referees: Quinn (INA), Ibragimow (TKM)

24 August
15:00

Qatar	21–7	Jordan
Pts: Dieng 9		Pts: Juha 3

Gelora Bung Karno Tennis Center Court, Jakarta
Referees: Ho (HKG), Quinn (INA)

24 August
15:20

Maldives	vs.	Nepal
Forfeit

Gelora Bung Karno Tennis Center Court, Jakarta

24 August
15:40

Syria	21–19	Nepal
Pts: Khouri 7		Pts: Basnet 9

Gelora Bung Karno Tennis Center Court, Jakarta
Referees: Liu (MAS), Quinn (INA)

24 August
16:00

Japan	21–15	Qatar
Pts: Matsuwaki 10		Pts: Muslić 8

Gelora Bung Karno Tennis Center Court, Jakarta
Referees: Ho (HKG), Shi (CHN)

24 August
16:20

Japan	vs.	Maldives
Forfeit

Gelora Bung Karno Tennis Center Court, Jakarta

24 August
16:50

Nepal	21–10	Jordan
Pts: Basnet 13		Pts: Jarrad 4

Gelora Bung Karno Tennis Center Court, Jakarta
Referees: Quinn (INA), Liu (MAS)

24 August
17:30

Japan	21–13	Syria
Pts: Matsuwaki 17		Pts: Khouri 6

Gelora Bung Karno Tennis Center Court, Jakarta
Referees: Rulyov (KAZ), Tan (SGP)

24 August
17:50

Jordan	vs.	Maldives
Forfeit

Gelora Bung Karno Tennis Center Court, Jakarta

==== Pool D ====
Pos	Team	Pld	W	L	PF	PA	PD	Qualification
1	Iran	5	5	0	99	56	+43	Quarterfinals
2	Kazakhstan	5	3 (Note: Head-to-head result: KAZ 21–18 IRQ.)	2	91	82	+9	Quarterfinals
3	Iraq	5	3	2	90	82	+8	
4	Malaysia	5	2 (Note: Head-to-head result: MAS 17–13 TKM.)	3	82	80	+2	
5	Turkmenistan	5	2	3	73	76	−3	
6	Afghanistan	5	0	5	47	106	−59	

Source: OCA
Notes:

22 August
17:30

Turkmenistan	14–16	Iraq
Pts: Mämmetmyradow 6		Pts: Hasan 10

Gelora Bung Karno Tennis Center Court, Jakarta
Referees: Liu (MAS), Lim (MAS)

22 August
17:50

Kazakhstan	21–12	Afghanistan
Pts: Aitkali 12		Pts: Khairi 9

Gelora Bung Karno Tennis Center Court, Jakarta
Referees: Quinn (INA), Lim (MAS)

22 August
18:40

Malaysia	13–18	Iran
Pts: Heng 7		Pts: Azari 8

Gelora Bung Karno Tennis Center Court, Jakarta
Referees: Ho (HKG), Al-Harthi (OMA)

22 August
19:00

Kazakhstan	13–17	Turkmenistan
Pts: Litvinenko 8		Pts: Hojamedow 12

Gelora Bung Karno Tennis Center Court, Jakarta
Referees: Ito (JPN), Shi (CHN)

22 August
19:20

Malaysia	22–9	Afghanistan
Pts: Liew 8		Pts: Mirzad 5

Gelora Bung Karno Tennis Center Court, Jakarta
Referees: Ho (HKG), Tan (SGP)

22 August
20:10

Kazakhstan	15–21	Iran
Pts: Aitkali 10		Pts: Khajehzadeh 8

Gelora Bung Karno Tennis Center Court, Jakarta
Referees: Ho (HKG), Shi (CHN)

22 August
20:30

Iraq	19–16	Malaysia
Pts: Hasan 11		Pts: Ting 8

Gelora Bung Karno Tennis Center Court, Jakarta
Referees: Tan (SGP), Ito (JPN)

22 August
21:30

Turkmenistan	22–9	Afghanistan
Pts: Mämmetmyradow 10		Pts: Khairi 6

Gelora Bung Karno Tennis Center Court, Jakarta
Referees: Ito (JPN), Al-Harthi (OMA)

25 August
15:00

Iran	19–16	Iraq
Pts: Allahverdi 7		Pts: Mohammed 6

Gelora Bung Karno Tennis Center Court, Jakarta
Referees: Ho (HKG), Shi (CHN)

25 August
15:20

Malaysia	14–21	Kazakhstan
Pts: Ting 10		Pts: Belozor 8

Gelora Bung Karno Tennis Center Court, Jakarta
Referees: Quinn (INA), Tan (SGP)

25 August
16:00

Iran	21–7	Turkmenistan
Pts: Azari 7		Pts: Bekçanow, Hojamedow 3

Gelora Bung Karno Tennis Center Court, Jakarta
Referees: Ho (HKG), Quinn (INA)

25 August
16:20

Afghanistan	12–21	Iraq
Pts: Khairi 9		Pts: Hasan 10

Gelora Bung Karno Tennis Center Court, Jakarta
Referees: Ito (JPN), Quinn (INA)

25 August
17:10

Turkmenistan	13–17	Malaysia
Pts: Bekçanow 5		Pts: Wong 7

Gelora Bung Karno Tennis Center Court, Jakarta
Referees: Tan (SGP), Ho (HKG)

25 August
17:30

Iraq	18–21	Kazakhstan
Pts: Hasan 9		Pts: Aitkali 13

Gelora Bung Karno Tennis Center Court, Jakarta
Referees: Shi (CHN), Quinn (INA)

25 August
18:10

Afghanistan	5–20	Iran
Pts: Mirzad, Khairi 2		Pts: Allahverdi 6

Gelora Bung Karno Tennis Center Court, Jakarta
Referees: Liu (MAS), Al-Harthi (OMA)

=== Knockout round ===
Quarterfinals
26 August
China	21
Qatar	18
26 August
Iran	18
Chinese Taipei	17
26 August
South Korea	17
Kazakhstan	13
26 August
Japan	13
Thailand	21

Semifinals
26 August
China	21
Iran	19
26 August
South Korea	20
Thailand	16

Gold medal game
26 August
China (OT)	19
South Korea	18
Bronze medal game
26 August
Iran	21
Thailand	7

==== Quarterfinals ====
26 August
14:00

China	21–18	Qatar
Pts: Huang 8		Pts: Muslić 7

Gelora Bung Karno Tennis Center Court, Jakarta
Referees: Ito (JPN), Rulyov (KAZ)

26 August
14:20

Iran	18–17	Chinese Taipei
Pts: Azari 8		Pts: Chu 11

Gelora Bung Karno Tennis Center Court, Jakarta
Referees: Ho (HKG), Shi (CHN)

26 August
16:10

South Korea	17–13	Kazakhstan
Pts: Kim 7		Pts: Aitkali 6

Gelora Bung Karno Tennis Center Court, Jakarta
Referees: Liu (MAS), Tan (SGP)

26 August
16:30

Japan	13–21	Thailand
Pts: Matsuwaki 10		Pts: Korsah-dick 10

Gelora Bung Karno Tennis Center Court, Jakarta
Referees: Ho (HKG), Quinn (INA)

==== Semifinals ====
26 August
18:00

China	21–19	Iran
Pts: Huang 9		Pts: Allahverdi 11

Gelora Bung Karno Tennis Center Court, Jakarta
Referees: Ito (JPN), Rulyov (KAZ)

26 August
18:30

South Korea	20–16	Thailand
Pts: An 8		Pts: Korsah-dick 9

Gelora Bung Karno Tennis Center Court, Jakarta
Referees: Ho (HKG), Ibragimow (TKM)

==== Bronze medal game ====
26 August
19:45

Iran	21–7	Thailand
Pts: Allahverdi, Yousefvand 8		Pts: Korsah-dick 4

Gelora Bung Karno Tennis Center Court, Jakarta
Referees: Liu (MAS), Shi (CHN)

==== Gold medal game ====
26 August
21:00

China	19–18 (OT)	South Korea
Pts: Huang 7		Pts: An 10

Gelora Bung Karno Tennis Center Court, Jakarta
Referees: Ito (JPN), Quinn (INA)

== Final standing ==
Rank	Team	Pld	W	L
1st place, gold medalist(s)	China	7	7	0
2nd place, silver medalist(s)	South Korea	7	6	1
3rd place, bronze medalist(s)	Iran	8	7	1
4	Thailand	7	4	3
5	Japan	6	5	1
6	Qatar	6	4	2
7	Chinese Taipei	5	3	2
8	Kazakhstan	6	3	3
9	Iraq	5	3	2
10	Syria	5	3	2
11	Indonesia	4	2	2
12	Mongolia	4	2	2
13	Malaysia	5	2	3
14	Nepal	5	2	3
15	Turkmenistan	5	2	3
16	Sri Lanka	4	1	3
17	Kyrgyzstan	4	1	3
18	Jordan	5	1	4
19	Afghanistan	5	0	5
20	Bangladesh	4	0	4
21	Vietnam	4	0	4
—	Maldives	5	0	5
