= Thailand at the Asian Games =

- IOC code: THA
- NOC: National Olympic Committee of Thailand
- Website: olympicthai.org/en/ (in English and Thai)
- Medals Ranked 7th: Gold 162 Silver 202 Bronze 332 Total 696

Summer appearances
- 1951; 1954; 1958; 1962; 1966; 1970; 1974; 1978; 1982; 1986; 1990; 1994; 1998; 2002; 2006; 2010; 2014; 2018; 2022; 2026

Winter appearances
- 1996; 1999; 2003; 2007; 2011; 2017; 2025; 2029

Thailand has competed at every celebration of the Asian Games, including hosting the Games in 1966, 1970, 1978 and 1998. Thai athletes have won a total of 156 gold medals (7th out of 43) and 676 overall medals (7th out of 43) at the Asian Games.

== Asian Games ==
=== Medals by Games ===
Games	Athletes	Gold	Silver	Bronze	Total	Rank
(India) New Delhi 1951	12	0	0	0	0	−
(Philippines) Manila 1954	19	0	0	0	0	−
(Japan) Tokyo 1958	47	0	1	3	4	12
(Indonesia) Jakarta 1962	127	2	6	4	12	7
(Thailand) Bangkok 1966	307	12	14	11	37	3
(Thailand) Bangkok 1970	472	9	17	13	39	3
(Iran) Tehran 1974	97	4	2	8	14	8
(Thailand) Bangkok 1978	948	11	12	19	42	5
(India) New Delhi 1982	233	1	5	4	10	12
(South Korea) Seoul 1986	204	3	10	13	26	7
(China) Beijing 1990	414	2	7	8	17	9
(Japan) Hiroshima 1994	1129	3	9	14	26	12
(Thailand) Bangkok 1998	1055	24	26	40	90	4
(South Korea) Busan 2002	267	14	19	10	43	6
(Qatar) Doha 2006	378	13	15	26	54	5
(China) Guangzhou 2010	593	11	9	32	52	9
(South Korea) Incheon 2014	518	12	7	28	47	6
(Indonesia) Jakarta−Palembang 2018	829	11	16	46	73	12
(China) Hangzhou 2022	934	12	14	32	58	8
(Japan) Aichi–Nagoya 2026	694	18	13	21	52	7
(Qatar) Doha 2030	Future event					
(Saudi Arabia) Riyadh 2034	Future event					
Total (19/19)	8,583	162	202	332	696	7

- Gold
- Silver
- Bronze

=== Medals by sport ===
Sport	Gold	Silver	Bronze	Total
Athletics	16	18	22	56
Badminton	2	11	17	30
Basketball	0	1	1	2
Beach volleyball	2	1	1	4
Bodybuilding	1	0	0	1
Bowling	6	10	8	24
Boxing	21	26	35	82
Bridge	0	1	2	3
Canoeing	0	2	4	6
Cue sports	3	4	7	14
Cycling	15	13	11	39
Diving	0	0	3	3
Dragon boat	0	1	7	8
Equestrian	3	4	6	13
Esports	2	2	3	7
Fencing	0	0	2	2
Golf	3	2	3	8
Gymnastics	1	0	0	1
Jet ski	1	2	2	5
Judo	0	0	9	9
Ju-jitsu	1	0	5	6
Kabaddi	0	1	3	4
Karate	0	2	10	12
Kurash	0	0	3	3
Mixed martial arts	1	0	0	1
Paragliding	2	1	1	4
Pencak silat	0	2	5	7
Roller sports	0	0	1	1
Rowing	0	3	12	15
Rugby	0	0	3	3
Sailing	15	17	29	61
Sepak takraw	32	7	1	40
Shooting	11	30	39	80
Swimming	4	3	10	17
Table tennis	0	0	2	2
Taekwondo	8	12	24	44
Tennis	5	6	11	22
Teqball	3	0	0	3
Volleyball	0	1	3	4
Water polo	0	0	1	1
Weightlifting	2	16	19	37
Wushu	2	3	7	12
Total	162	202	332	696

== Asian Winter Games ==
=== Medals by Games ===
Games	Gold	Silver	Bronze	Total	Rank
(Japan) Sapporo 1986	did not participate				
(Japan) Sapporo 1990	did not participate				
(China) Harbin 1996	0	0	0	0	−
(South Korea) Gangwon 1999	did not participate				
(Japan) Aomori 2003	0	0	0	0	−
(China) Changchun 2007	0	0	0	0	−
(Kazakhstan) Astana−Almaty 2011	0	0	0	0	−
(Japan) Sapporo 2017	0	0	0	0	−
(China) Harbin 2025	0	0	1	1	8
(Kazakhstan) Almaty 2029	Future event				
Total	0	0	1	1	11

=== Medals by Sport ===
Sport	Gold	Silver	Bronze	Total
Freestyle skiing	0	0	1	1
Total	0	0	1	1

== Asian Indoor and Martial Arts Games ==
=== Medals by Games ===
Games	Gold	Silver	Bronze	Total	Rank
Asian Indoor Games
(Thailand) Bangkok 2005	20	21	33	74	3
Macau 2007	19	28	22	69	2
(Vietnam) Hanoi 2009	19	17	34	70	4
Asian Martial Arts Games
(Thailand) Bangkok 2009	21	17	16	54	1
Asian Indoor and Martial Arts Games
(South Korea) Incheon 2014	8	3	11	22	4
(Turkmenistan) Ashgabat 2017	21	20	29	70	6
(Thailand) Bangkok−Chonburi 2021	Cancelled				
(Saudi Arabia) Riyadh 2025	Future event				
Total	108	106	145	359	2

=== Medals by sport ===
Sport	Gold	Silver	Bronze	Total
3x3 basketball	2	0	1	3
Aerobic gymnastics	0	4	6	10
Bowling	1	1	3	5
Boxing	1	1	3	5
Cue sports	5	5	3	13
Dancesport	0	2	6	8
Dragon and lion dance	0	0	2	2
Extreme sports	12	13	5	30
Finswimming	0	0	1	1
Futsal	1	5	3	9
Go	0	0	1	1
Indoor archery	1	2	0	3
Indoor athletics	9	24	28	61
Indoor cycling	0	0	6	6
Indoor kabaddi	0	0	2	2
Indoor tennis	2	0	3	5
Judo	0	2	3	5
Ju-jitsu	7	4	8	19
Karate	0	0	2	2
Kickboxing	3	4	5	12
Kurash	1	7	4	12
Muay Thai	36	6	2	44
Pencak silat	3	5	3	11
Pétanque	3	0	1	4
Sambo	0	0	2	2
Sepak takraw	6	0	0	6
Short course swimming	10	14	25	49
Shuttlecock	0	0	3	3
Sport climbing	0	1	0	1
Taekwondo	3	3	5	11
Track cycling	0	2	4	6
Wushu	2	1	5	8
Total	108	106	145	359

== Asian Beach Games ==
=== Medals by Games ===
Games	Athletes	Gold	Silver	Bronze	Total	Rank
(Indonesia) Bali 2005		10	17	10	37	2
(Oman) Muscat 2007		15	10	12	37	1
(China) Haiyang 2012		13	9	6	28	2
(Thailand) Phuket 2014		56	37	33	126	1
(Vietnam) Danang 2016		36	24	30	90	2
(China) Sanya 2026		10	9	9	28	2
Total	Bold text	140	106	100	346	1

=== Medals by sport ===
Sport	Gold	Silver	Bronze	Total
3x3 basketball	0	3	3	6
Air sport	9	8	1	18
Beach athletics	9	5	7	21
Beach flag football	1	0	0	1
Beach handball	1	2	5	8
Beach kabaddi	0	5	1	6
Beach kurash	1	1	4	6
Beach sambo	0	1	2	3
Beach sepak takraw	19	1	0	20
Beach volleyball	4	3	2	9
Beach water polo	0	0	1	1
Beach woodball	20	16	2	38
Beach wrestling	0	2	7	9
Bodybuilding	3	4	5	12
Coastal rowing	3	1	1	5
Dragon boat	1	5	7	13
Extreme sports	6	6	4	16
Footvolley	1	0	0	1
Jet ski	8	7	6	21
Ju-jitsu	5	5	11	21
Muay Thai	17	3	2	22
Open water swimming	1	1	0	2
Pencak silat	5	2	5	12
Pétanque	9	3	5	17
Sailing	9	13	12	34
Sport climbing	0	1	0	1
Shuttlecock	0	3	4	7
Teqball	3	0	0	3
Waterskiing	5	5	3	13
Total	140	106	100	346

== Asian Esports and Mind Sports Games ==
=== Medals by Games ===
Games	Gold	Silver	Bronze	Total	Rank
Kuwait City 2027	Future event				
Total					

=== Medals by sport ===
Sport	Gold	Silver	Bronze	Total
Total				

== Asian Youth Games ==
=== Medals by Games ===
Games	Gold	Silver	Bronze	Total	Rank
Singapore 2009	11	7	2	20	3
(China) Nanjing 2013	6	15	16	37	4
Bahrain 2025	15	15	18	48	5
(Uzbekistan) Tashkent 2029	Future event				
Total	32	37	36	105	4

=== Medals by sport ===
Sport	Gold	Silver	Bronze	Total
3-on-3 basketball	0	0	1	1
Athletics	8	7	6	21
Badminton	1	3	1	5
Beach volleyball	2	2	0	4
Beach wrestling	0	0	1	1
Bowling	0	1	0	1
Cycling	0	1	1	2
Esports	1	1	0	2
Futsal	0	0	1	1
Golf	0	1	1	2
Judo	0	0	1	1
Ju-jitsu	1	0	0	1
Kabaddi	0	0	1	1
Mixed martial arts	0	1	0	1
Muaythai	4	4	1	9
Rugby sevens	0	1	0	1
Sailing	3	2	0	5
Shooting	0	0	2	2
Swimming	4	4	10	18
Taekwondo	4	3	2	9
Tennis	0	0	2	2
Teqball	4	1	0	5
Volleyball	0	0	2	2
Weightlifting	0	5	2	7
Wrestling	0	0	1	1
Total	32	37	36	105

== See also ==
- Olympics
  - Thailand at the Olympics
  - Thailand at the Youth Olympics
- Paralympic
  - Thailand at the Paralympics
- Asian Games
  - Thailand at the Asian Para Games
- Other
  - Thailand at the Southeast Asian Games
  - Thailand at the Universiade
  - Thailand at the World Games
  - Thailand at the Deaflympics
