= Mohammad Mehdi Rahimi =

Iranian basketball player

No. 32 – Mahram Tehran
- Position: Forwards
- League: Iranian Basketball Super League

Personal information
- Born: 24 June 2003 (age 23) Tehran, Iran
- Listed height: 6 ft 8 in (2.03 m)
- Listed weight: 105 lb (48 kg)

Career information
- Playing career: 2019–present

Career history
- 2021: Kale Mazandaran
- 2022: Mahram Tehran
Medals
Men's basketball
Representing Iran
FIBA Asia Cup
Bronze medal – third place	2025 Jeddah

Mohammad Mehdi Rahimi (Persian: محمدمهدی رحیمی; born 24 June 2003 in Tehran) is an Iranian professional basketball player for Mahram Tehran BC of the Iranian Basketball Super League.

== Career ==
- Mohammad Mehdi Rahimi has a history of playing in the Iranian national 3x3 basketball team and, together with the Iranian national team, has reached the position of runner-up in the FIBA Asia Cup basketball competitions.
- Rahimi was also with the Iranian national basketball team at the Hangzhou Asian Games.

== Other Websites ==
Mohammad Mehdi Rahimi on Instagram
