= 2013 FIBA Asia 3x3 Championship =

The 2013 FIBA Asia 3x3 Championship was the first edition of the FIBA Asia 3X3 championship. The games were held in Doha, Qatar between 15 and 16 May 2013.

== Men ==
=== Preliminary round ===
==== Group A ====
Team	Pld	W	L	PF	PA	Pts
Qatar Maroon	3	3	0	60	38	6
Philippines	3	2	1	49	45	5
Mongolia	3	1	2	50	59	4
Sri Lanka	3	0	3	37	54	3

	MGL	PHI	QAT	SRI
Mongolia		15–21	16–21	19–17
Philippines	21–15		11–21	17–9
Qatar Maroon	21–16	21–11		18–11
Sri Lanka	17–19	9–17	11–18	

==== Group B ====
Team	Pld	W	L	PF	PA	Pts
Iran	3	2	1	53	44	5
India	3	2	1	54	51	5
Turkmenistan	3	1	2	51	50	4
Indonesia	3	1	2	44	57	4

	INA	IND	IRI	TKM
Indonesia		13–21	17–15	14–21
India	21–13		14–21	19–17
Iran	15–17	21–14		17–13
Turkmenistan	21–14	17–19	13–17	

==== Group C ====
Team	Pld	W	L	PF	PA	Pts
Saudi Arabia	3	3	0	58	43	6
Chinese Taipei	3	2	1	51	41	5
Lebanon	3	1	2	54	44	4
Nepal	3	0	3	27	62	3

	KSA	LIB	NEP	TPE
Saudi Arabia		22–19	20–10	16–14
Lebanon	19–22		21–6	14–16
Nepal	10–20	6–21		11–21
Chinese Taipei	14–16	16–14	21–11	

==== Group D ====
Team	Pld	W	L	PF	PA	Pts
Jordan	3	2	1	42	37	5
Qatar Grey	3	2	1	49	40	5
Japan	3	1	2	50	51	4
Hong Kong	3	1	2	44	57	4

	HKG	JOR	JPN	QAT
Hong Kong		18–17	15–20	11–20
Jordan	17–18		14–12	11–7
Japan	20–15	12–14		18–22
Qatar Grey	20–11	7–11	22–18	

=== Knockout round ===
Quarterfinals
Qatar Maroon	21
Qatar Grey	9
Iran	21
Chinese Taipei	15
Philippines	10
Jordan	15
India	5
Saudi Arabia	16

Semifinals
Qatar Maroon	19
Iran	16
Jordan	12
Saudi Arabia	13

Final
Qatar Maroon	19
Saudi Arabia	17
3rd place
Iran	19
Jordan	8

== Women ==
=== Preliminary round ===
==== Group A ====
Team	Pld	W	L	PF	PA	Pts
Turkmenistan	4	4	0	72	44	8
Hong Kong	4	3	1	66	48	7
Sri Lanka	4	2	2	57	61	6
Qatar	4	1	3	52	64	5
Indonesia	4	0	4	37	67	4

	HKG	INA	QAT	SRI	TKM
Hong Kong		20–7	19–13	18–7	9–21
Indonesia	7–20		10–14	9–17	11–16
Qatar	13–19	14–10		13–21	12–14
Sri Lanka	7–18	17–9	21–13		12–21
Turkmenistan	21–9	16–11	14–12	21–12	

==== Group B ====
Team	Pld	W	L	PF	PA	Pts
India	3	3	0	63	19	6
Mongolia	3	2	1	37	33	5
Lebanon	3	1	2	25	40	4
Nepal	3	0	3	16	49	3

	IND	LIB	MGL	NEP
India		20–6	21–9	22–4
Lebanon	6–20		6–14	13–6
Mongolia	9–21	14–6		14–6
Nepal	4–22	6–13	6–14	

=== Knockout round ===
Quarterfinals
Turkmenistan	18
Nepal	6
Mongolia	18
Sri Lanka	13
Hong Kong	17
Lebanon	9
India	21
Qatar	5

Semifinals
Turkmenistan	17
Mongolia	19
Hong Kong	8
India	21

Final
Mongolia	14
India	21
3rd place
Turkmenistan	10
Hong Kong	8

== Medalists ==
Event	Gold	Silver	Bronze
Men	Qatar; Boney Watson; Malek Saleem; Khalid Suliman; Yasseen Ismail	Saudi Arabia; Marzouq Al-Muwallad; Ayman Al-Muwallad; Mohammed Al-Saqer; Nassir Abo-Jalas	Iran; Mohammad Hassanzadeh; Saeid Davarpanah; Mousa Nabipour; Mohammad Jamshidi
Women	India; Geethu Anna Jose; Anitha Pauldurai; Manisha Dange; Pratima Singh	Mongolia; Buriadyn Altanzayaa; Davaasürengiin Ganzul; Jambalyn Ishtayaa; Bayasgalangiin Solongo	Turkmenistan; Irina Yakovleva; Irina Kasparova; Nigyara Nagiyeva; Ayna Gokova

== Award ==
Dream Team All Star Selection

- Men: Boney Watson (QAT), Ali El Zubi (JOR), Mousa Nabipour (IRI)
- Women: Geethu Anna Jose (IND), Nigyara Nagiyeva (TKM), Lea Abi Ghosn (LBN)
