= Sri Lanka Basketball Federation =

Governing body of basketball in Sri Lanka

- Abbreviation: SLBF
- Predecessor: Ceylon Basketball Association (CBA)
- Formation: 1958
- Type: National Sport Association
- Location: Colombo, Sri Lanka
- Key people: Alelian Gunawarde (President)
- Affiliations: FIBA, FIBA Asia, National Olympic Committee of Sri Lanka
- Website: www.slbasketball.com

The Sri Lanka Basketball Federation is the governing body of basketball in Sri Lanka. It is associated with FIBA and FIBA Asia, as well as the National Olympic Committee of Sri Lanka.
