= Macao Polytechnic University Multisport Pavilion =

Sports venue in Macau, China

Coordinates: 22.1944°N 113.5515°E

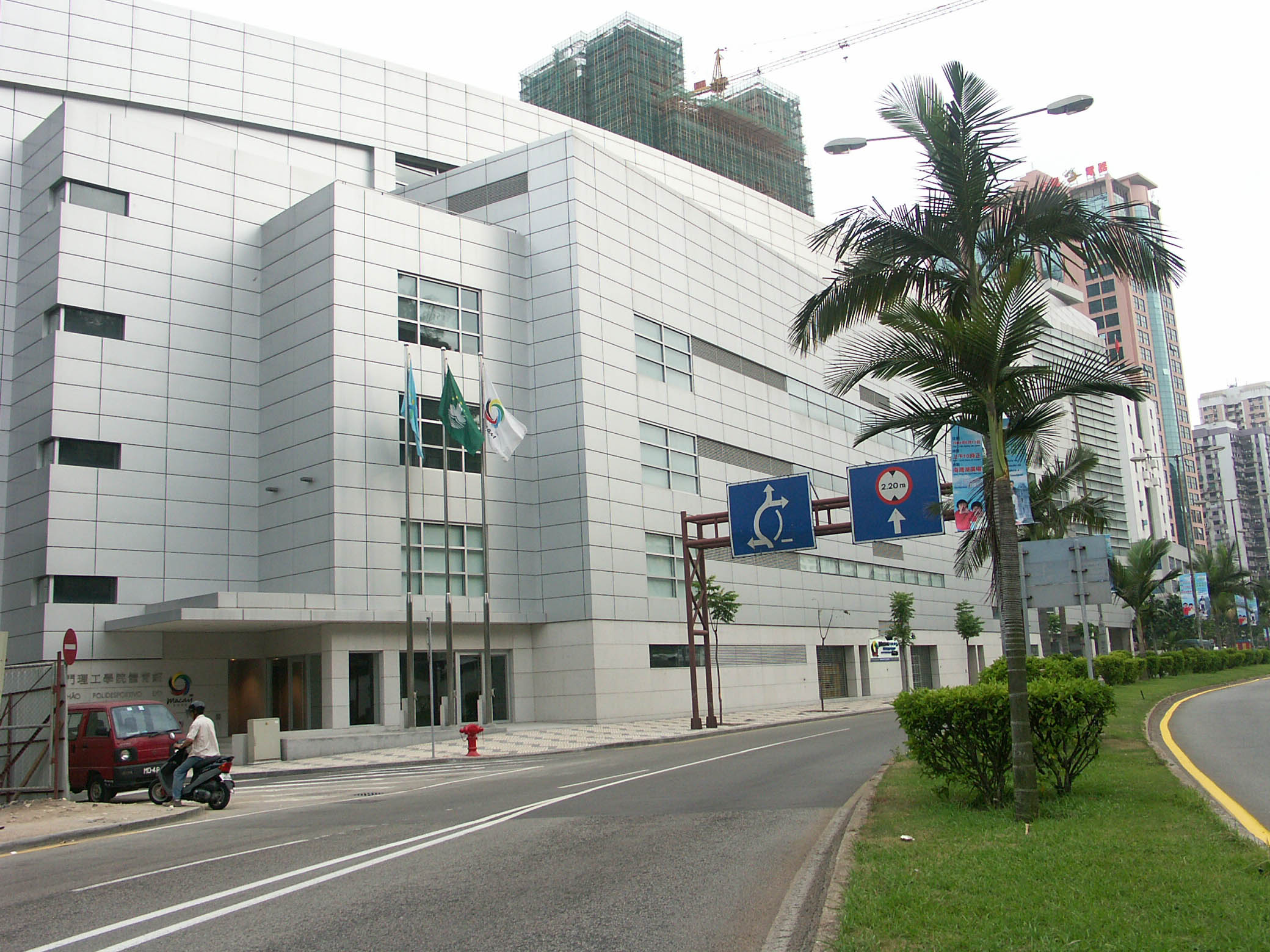
Macao Polytechnic University Multisport Pavilion

The Macao Polytechnic University Multisport Pavilion (formerly named Macao Polytechnic Institute Multisport Pavilion) is part of the Macao Polytechnic University (MPU) in Macau, People's Republic of China. It covers a total area of over 6,200 square metres (67,000 sq ft) and has a seating capacity of 3,800. This modern pavilion is ideal for indoor sports such as basketball, assorted ball games, and volleyball. It is connected to the adjacent Macao Forum via a footbridge and a short underground passage.

On March 1, 2022, the Macao Polytechnic Institute was officially renamed as Macao Polytechnic University, and the Multisport Pavilion has been renamed simultaneously.

== See also ==
- Sports in Macau
- Macao Polytechnic University
