= Philippines men's national 3x3 team =

National 3x3 basketball team

Philippines
- FIBA ranking: 43
- Joined FIBA: 1936
- FIBA zone: FIBA Asia
- National federation: SBP

FIBA 3x3 World Cup
- Appearances: 3 (first in 2016)

FIBA 3x3 Asia Cup
- Appearances: 5 (first in 2013)
Home	Away

The Philippines men's national 3x3 team represents the country in international 3x3 basketball matches and is governed by the Samahang Basketbol ng Pilipinas.

== History ==
When 3x3 was held at the 2007 Asian Indoor Games as a demonstration sports the Philippine national team finished fourth with Hong Kong defeating them in the third place play-off. Luigi Trillo was the coach that guided national team composing of Nico Salva, Ryan Buenafe, Arvie Bringas and Clark Bautista, in the games.

The Philippines also participated in the 2010 Youth Summer Olympics in Singapore, the first edition of the Youth Olympics where 3x3 is among the sports contested. The national team finished ninth.

By the virtue of the Philippines' FIBA 3x3 Federation Ranking, the national team qualified for the 2016 FIBA 3x3 World Championships and made their debut in the tournament. They lost 2 and win 2 of their four matches.

The national team played their second stint in the world championships, now renamed as the FIBA 3x3 World Cup in 2018 which was hosted at home in Bocaue. This time the Philippine national team composed of professional players and Bounty Agro Ventures, the owners of Chooks-to-Go and sponsor of the national team and tournament, pledged unspecified monetary reward for the Philippine national team for each game won. Like in 2016, they lost half of their four matches (to Mongolia and Canada) but won over Brazil and Russia which were ranked fifth and third respectively. The team which is composed of players who typically plays the full 5-a-side basketball cited its experience in 3x3 for its finishing.

The Samahang Basketbol ng Pilipinas (SBP), the country's national association, planned to come up with a road map to help the Philippines qualify a team in 3x3 basketball in the 2020 Summer Olympics following the national team's stint in the 2018 FIBA 3x3 World Cup. The SBP planned to create a pool of players dedicated to the 3x3 variant of basketball. The SBP, along with private sponsor Chooks-to-Go, started the process in August 2018 with the launch of a national tour to help scout for players across the country.

The SBP managed to help the Philippine men's national team secure a berth in the Olympic Qualifying Tournament (OQT) for the 2020 Summer Olympics via the world rankings. The Chooks-to-Go Pilipinas 3x3 league and the Manok ng Bayan–SBP 3X3 youth tournament to help raise enough world ranking points for the Philippine men's national team to qualify a spot in the OQT. Serbians Stefan Stojavic and Darko Krsman were tasked to help prepare the Philippines for their OQT bid.

== Roster ==
This is the roster for the 2026 FIBA 3x3 Asia Cup – Men's tournament.

Philippines men's national 3x3 team – 2025 FIBA 3x3 Asia Cup roster
Players
Coaches

Pos.	No.	Name	Age – Date of birth	Height	Club	Ctr.
G		Jerrick Ahanmisi	27 – October 16, 1997	1.85 m (6 ft 1 in)	Terrafirma Dyip	(Philippines)
F		Ralph Cu	28 – March 8, 1997	1.93 m (6 ft 4 in)	Barangay Ginebra San Miguel	(Philippines)
G/F		Chris Koon	24 – February 6, 2001	1.96 m (6 ft 5 in)	Magnolia Chicken Timplados Hotshots	(Philippines)
C		Sean Alter	20 – May 22, 2004	2.03 m (6 ft 8 in)	UP Fighting Maroons	(Philippines)

Head coach

- (Philippines) Patrick Fran
- (United States) Kirk Collier
- (Philippines) JJ Espanola

== Senior competitions ==
=== World Cup ===
Year	Position	Pld	W	L
(Greece) 2012	Did not qualify			
(Russia) 2014	Did not qualify			
(China) 2016	9th place	4	2	2
(France) 2017	11th place	4	2	2
(Philippines) 2018	11th place	4	2	2
(Netherlands) 2019	Did not qualify			
(Belgium) 2022	Did not qualify			
(Austria) 2023	Did not qualify			
(Mongolia) 2025	Did not qualify			
(Poland) 2026	Did not qualify			
(Singapore) 2027	To be determined			
Total		12	6	6

=== Asia Cup ===
Year	Position	Pld	W	L
(Qatar) 2013	Quarterfinals	4	2	2
(Mongolia) 2017	Did not enter			
(China) 2018	Did not enter			
(China) 2019	Did not qualify			
(Singapore) 2022	Fourth place	5	2	3
(Singapore) 2023	10th place	2	0	2
(Singapore) 2024	11th place	2	0	2
(Singapore) 2025	15th place	3	2	1
(Singapore) 2026	6th place	5	3	2
Total		21	9	12

=== Asian Indoor Games ===
Year	Position	Pld	W	L
(Macau) 2007	Fourth place	4	2	2
(Vietnam) 2009	Did not enter			
(Turkmenistan) 2017	Did not enter			
Total		4	2	2

- 3x3 in the 2007 edition was a demonstration sport.

=== Southeast Asian Games ===
Year	Position	Pld	W	L
(Philippines) 2019	1st place	8	8	0
(Vietnam) 2021	3rd place	8	5	3
(Cambodia) 2023	2nd place	5	4	1
(Thailand) 2025	Fourth place	5	3	2
Total		26	20	6

== Youth competitions ==
=== U18 World Cup ===
Year	Position	Pld	W	L
(Italy) 2011	Did not qualify			
(Serbia) 2012	Did not qualify			
(Indonesia) 2013	18th	7	3	4
(Hungary) 2015	17th	5	2	3
(Kazakhstan) 2016	17th	4	1	3
(China) 2017	7th	5	3	2
(Mongolia) 2019	Did not enter			
(Hungary) 2021	Did not enter			
(Hungary) 2022	Did not enter			
(Hungary) 2023	Did not enter			
(Hungary) 2024	Did not enter			
Total		21	9	12

=== Youth Olympics ===
Year	Position	Pld	W	L
(Singapore) 2010	9th	7	4	3
(China) 2014	Did not qualify			
(Argentina) 2018	Did not qualify			
(Senegal) 2026	Did not qualify			
Total		7	4	3

=== Asian Games ===
Year	Position	Pld	W	L
(Indonesia) 2018	Did not enter			
(China) 2022	8th	6	4	2
(Japan) 2026	4th	6	4	2
Total		12	8	4

=== Asian Youth Games ===
Year	Position	Pld	W	L
(Singapore) 2009	4th	7	5	2
(China) 2013	8th	6	3	3
(Bahrain) 2025	Did not enter			
Total		13	8	5

=== Asia U18 Cup ===
Year	Position	Pld	W	L
(Thailand) 2013	1st place	8	6	2
(Malaysia) 2016	2nd place	7	5	2
(Malaysia) 2017	7th place	3	1	2
(Malaysia) 2018	Did not enter			
(Malaysia) 2019	5th place	5	2	3
(Malaysia) 2022	Did not enter			
Total	1 gold 1 silver	23	14	9

== See also ==
- Philippines at the FIBA 3x3 World Tour - for teams that represented cities such as Manila North and Manila West.
- Philippines women's national 3x3 team
