= Sri Lanka men's national 3x3 team =

Sri Lankan men's national basketball team

- Nickname: Lanka Lions
- Conference: FIBA 3x3 World Championships
- Location: No 33, Independence Avenue, Colombo 07
- President: Ashok Jaykumar
- Team manager: Chulapadma Senaratne
- Team captain: Shakeel Shamaail (2021)
- Championships: Asian Championships

The Sri Lanka men's national 3x3 team is a national basketball team of Sri Lanka, administered by the Sri Lanka Basketball Federation.

It represents the country in international 3x3 (3 against 3) basketball competitions.

== Performance at Asian Games ==
Year	Pos	Pld	W	L
(Indonesia) 2018	16th	4	1	3

== See also ==
- Sri Lanka women's national 3x3 team
- Sri Lanka men's national basketball team
