= Saudi Arabia men's national 3x3 team =

National 3x3 basketball team

Saudi Arabia
- FIBA zone: FIBA Asia
- National federation: Saudi Arabian Basketball Federation

FIBA 3x3 World Championships
- Appearances: None

Asian Championships
- Appearances: 1
- Medals: Silver: 2013

The Saudi Arabia men's national 3x3 team is a national basketball team of Saudi Arabia, administered by the Saudi Arabian Basketball Federation. It represents the country in international 3x3 (3 against 3) basketball competitions.

== See also ==
- Saudi Arabia men's national basketball team
