= Sri Lanka women's national 3x3 team =

National 3x3 basketball team

Sri Lanka
- FIBA zone: FIBA Asia

FIBA 3x3 World Championships
- Appearances: None

FIBA Asia 3x3 Cup
- Appearances: 4
- Medals: None

The Sri Lanka women's national 3x3 team is a national basketball team of Sri Lanka and is administrated by the Sri Lanka Basketball Federation.

It represents the country in international 3x3 (3 against 3) women's basketball competitions.

Until 2021, the team has been competing mainly in junior tournaments and the Asia Cup.

== See also ==
- Sri Lanka women's national basketball team
- Sri Lanka men's national 3x3 team
