= Afghanistan men's national 3x3 team =

National 3x3 basketball team

Afghanistan
- FIBA zone: FIBA Asia

FIBA 3x3 World Championships
- Appearances: None

Asian Championships
- Appearances: None

Asian Beach Games
- Appearances: None

The Afghanistan men's national 3x3 team is a national basketball team of Afghanistan, administered by the Afghanistan National Basketball Federation (ANBF). It represents the country in international 3x3 (3 against 3) basketball competitions.

== Tournament record ==
=== Asian Indoor and Martial Arts Games ===
- 2009 (Vietnam) – 9th
- 2017 (Turkmenistan) – 9th

== See also ==
- Afghanistan women's national 3x3 team
- Afghanistan national basketball team
