= Nepal men's national 3x3 team =

National basketball team of Nepal

Nepal
- FIBA zone: FIBA Asia

FIBA 3x3 World Championships
- Appearances: 1 (2012)
- Medals: None

Asian Championships
- Appearances: 1 (2013)
- Medals: None

The Nepal men's national 3x3 team is a national basketball team of Nepal, administered by the Nepal Basketball Association. It represents the country in international 3x3 (3 against 3) basketball competitions.

== Asian Games ==
Year	Pos	Pld	W	L
(Indonesia) 2018	14th	5	2	3

== See also ==
- Nepal men's national basketball team
- Nepal women's national 3x3 team
