= Hong Kong men's national 3x3 team =

National 3x3 basketball team

Hong Kong
- FIBA zone: FIBA Asia
- National federation: Basketball Association of Hong Kong, China

3x3 World Cup
- Appearances: None

3x3 Asia Cup
- Appearances: 3
- Medals: None

The Hong Kong men's national 3x3 team is a representative 3x3 basketball team of Hong Kong, governed by the Basketball Association of Hong Kong, China. It represents the region in international 3x3 (3 against 3) basketball competitions.

== Tournament record ==
=== 3x3 Asia Cup ===
- 2013 – Preliminary round
- 2018 – 17th
- 2025 – 12th

=== Asian Indoor and Martial Arts Games ===
- 2007 (Macau) – (bronze)

== See also ==
- Hong Kong women's national 3x3 team
- Hong Kong national basketball team
