= India women's national 3x3 team =

National 3x3 basketball team

India
- FIBA ranking: 68
- FIBA zone: FIBA Asia
- National federation: Basketball Federation of India

World Cup
- Appearances: None

Asia Cup
- Appearances: 4
- Medals: (gold) 1st (2013)

Asian Games
- Appearances: 1
- Medals: None

Asian Indoor Games
- Appearances: 1
- Medals: (silver) 2nd (2009)
Home	Away

The India women's national 3x3 team is a national basketball team of India, governed by the Basketball Federation of India. It represents the country in international 3x3 women's basketball competitions.

== Tournament record ==
=== Asia Cup ===
Year	Host	Position
2013	Doha, Qatar	1st
2017	Ulaanbaatar, Mongolia	4th
2023	Singapore	11th
2024	Singapore	11th
2025	Singapore	18th (QD)
2026	Singapore	15th (QD)

=== Asian Games ===
Year	Host	Position
2022	Huzhou, China	9th

=== Asian Indoor Games ===
Year	Host	Position
2009	Hanoi, Vietnam	2nd

== See also ==
- India men's national 3x3 team
- India women's national basketball team
