= Kazakhstan men's national 3x3 team =

National 3x3 basketball team

Kazakhstan
- FIBA zone: FIBA Asia
- National federation: Kazakhstan Basketball Federation

The Kazakhstan men's national 3x3 team is the 3x3 basketball team representing Kazakhstan in international men's competitions.

The team competed in the men's tournament at the 2018 Asian Games held in Jakarta, Indonesia.

The team competed at the 2021 FIBA 3x3 Olympic Qualifying Tournament hoping to qualify for the 2020 Summer Olympics in Tokyo, Japan.
