= India men's national 3x3 team =

National 3x3 basketball team

India
- FIBA ranking: 67
- FIBA zone: FIBA Asia
- National federation: Basketball Federation of India

Asia Cup
- Appearances: 6

Asian Games
- Appearances: 1

Asian Indoor Games
- Appearances: 2
Home	Away

The India men's national 3x3 team, is controlled by the Basketball Federation of India and represents India in international 3x3 men's basketball competitions.

== Performance record ==
=== 3x3 Asia Cup ===
Year	Host	Position
2013	Doha, Qatar	QF
2017	Ulaanbaatar, Mongolia	9th
2022	Singapore	9th
2023	Singapore	11th
2025	Singapore	6th
2026	Singapore	12th

=== Asian Games ===
Year	Host	Position
2022	Huzhou, China	10th

=== Asian Indoor Games ===
Year	Host	Position
2007	Macau, China	5th
2009	Hanoi, Vietnam	4th

== See also ==
- India women's national 3x3 team
- India men's national basketball team
