= Thailand men's national 3x3 team =

National 3x3 basketball team

Thailand
- FIBA zone: FIBA Asia
- National federation: Basketball Sport Association of Thailand

The Thailand men's national 3x3 team is the 3x3 basketball team representing Thailand in international men's competitions.

The team lost their bronze medal match in the men's tournament at the 2018 Asian Games held in Jakarta, Indonesia.

The team also lost their bronze medal match in the men's 3x3 tournament at the 2019 Southeast Asian Games held in the Philippines.

== Champions Cup record ==
| Year | Position | Pld | W | L |
|---|---|---|---|---|
| (Thailand) 2025 Bangkok | 8th | 3 | 0 | 3 |
| (Thailand) 2026 Bangkok | 7th | 3 | 0 | 3 |
| Total | 2/2 | 6 | 0 | 6 |
