= Iran men's national 3x3 team =

National 3x3 basketball team

Iran
- FIBA zone: FIBA Asia
- National federation: Islamic Republic of Iran Basketball Federation

World Cup
- Appearances: 1

FIBA Asia 3x3 Cup
- Appearances: 5

The Iran men's national 3x3 team is the 3x3 basketball team representing Iran in international men's competitions.

== History ==
The team won the bronze medal in the men's tournament at the 2018 Asian Games held in Jakarta, Indonesia.

== Competitions ==
=== 3x3 Asia Cup ===
| Year | Rank | M | W | L | Ref |
|---|---|---|---|---|---|
| (Qatar) 2013 | 3/15 | 6 | 4 | 2 | |
| (China) 2018 | 11/21 | 8 | 5 | 3 | |
| (Singapore) 2023 | 5/12 | 6 | 5 | 1 | |
| (Singapore) 2024 | 2/12 | 7 | 6 | 1 | |
| (Singapore) 2025 | 10/12 | 2 | 0 | 2 | |
| Total | 5/8 | 29 | 20 | 9 | |

== See also ==
- Iran national basketball team
- Iran women's national 3x3 team
- FIBA 3x3 U17 Asia Cup
- Italy men's national 3x3 team
