= Qatar men's national 3x3 team =

National 3x3 basketball team

Qatar
- FIBA zone: FIBA Asia
- National federation: QBF

World Championships
- Appearances: 1
- Medals: Gold: 2014

Asian Cup
- Appearances: 9
- Medals: Gold: 2013

Asian Games
- Appearances: 2
- Medals: (silver) Silver: (2022)
Home	Away
Medal record
Representing Qatar
Men's 3x3 basketball
World Cup
Gold medal – first place	2014 Moscow	Men's team
Asian Cup
Gold medal – first place	2013 Doha	Men's team
Asian Games
Silver medal – second place	2022 Hangzhou	Team
Asian Indoor Games
Gold medal – first place	2017 Ashgabat	Men's team
Asian Beach Games
Gold medal – first place	2016 Danang	Men's team
Gold medal – first place	2014 Phuket	Men's team

The Qatar men's national 3x3 team represents the country in international 3x3 basketball (3 against 3) competitions. It is administered by the Qatar Basketball Federation. (Arabic: الاتحاد القطري لكرة السلة)

In 2014, Qatar were the reigning 3x3 basketball world champions as well as the Champion of Asia. The team also won the 2013, 2014 and 2015 editions of the GCC 3x3 Basketball Championships.

== Tournament record ==
=== Asian Games ===
Year	Pos	Pld	W	L
(Indonesia) 2018	6th	6	4	2
(China) 2022	2nd	7	6	1

=== 3x3 Asia Cup ===
- 2013 – 1st
- 2017 – 10th
- 2018 – 6th
- 2019 – 6th
- 2022 – 11th
- 2023 – 6th
- 2024 – 8th
- 2025 – 8th
- 2026 – 8th

== See also ==
- Qatar men's national basketball team
- Qatar women's national basketball team
- Qatar men's national under-19 basketball team
- Qatar men's national under-16 basketball team
