= 3x3 basketball at the 2026 Asian Games =

- Venue: Kinjō-futō Station Square
- Location: Nagoya, Aichi Prefecture, Japan
- Dates: 21 – 25 September 2026
- Competitors: 128 from 18 nations

3x3 basketball at the 2026 Asian Games was held between 21 and 25 September at Kinjō-futō Station Square.

A temporary court near the Kinjō-futō Station of the Aonami Line in Nagoya was set up.

Both the men's and women's 3x3 basketball tournament is restricted to players aged 23 and under.

== Schedule ==
The schedule is as follows:

P	Preliminary round	Q	Quarterfinal qualifying	¼	Quarterfinals	½	Semifinals	F	Finals

Event↓/Date →	21st Mon	22nd Tue	23rd Wed	24th Thu		25th Fri	
Men	P	P	P	Q	¼	½	F
Women	P	P	P	Q	¼	½	F

== Medal summary ==
=== Medal table ===
Rank	Nation	Gold	Silver	Bronze	Total
1	South Korea	1	0	1	2
2	Japan*	1	0	0	1
3	Philippines	0	1	0	1
3	Qatar	0	1	0	1
5	Iran	0	0	1	1
Totals (5 entries)		2	2	2	6

=== Medalists ===
Event	Gold	Silver	Bronze
Men	South Korea; Kim Seung-woo; Ku Min-gyo; Lee Dong-geun; Lee Ju-yeong	Qatar; Mohammed Abbasher; Mubarak Jama; Nazar Mahmoud; Hamad Mousa	Iran; Seyedmohammad Ghafari; Sarem Jafari; Mohammadbasir Momeni; Mohammadmahdi Rahimi
Women	Japan; Yuki Hirashita; Sakura Horiuchi; Fatoumanana Nishi; Haruka Yamamoto	Philippines; Kacey Dela Rosa; Amyah Espanol; Kennan Ka; Maria Pasilang	South Korea; Choi Ye-seul; Heo Yoo-jung; Kim Jeong-eun; Song Yun-ha

== Participation summary ==
NOC	Men	Women	Athletes
Bahrain	Yes	—N/a	4
China	Yes	Yes	8
Chinese Taipei	Yes	Yes	8
Hong Kong	Yes	—N/a	4
Japan	Yes	Yes	8
Macau	—N/a	Yes	4
Mongolia	Yes	Yes	8
Indonesia	Yes	Yes	8
Iran	Yes	Yes	8
Kazakhstan	Yes	Yes	8
Malaysia	Yes	Yes	8
Mongolia	Yes	Yes	8
Philippines	Yes	Yes	8
Qatar	Yes	Yes	8
Singapore	Yes	Yes	8
South Korea	Yes	Yes	8
Sri Lanka	Yes	Yes	8
Uzbekistan	—N/a	Yes	4
Total: 18 NOC's	16	16	128

== Draw ==
The participating teams and their groups were decided on 28 July 2026.

=== Men ===
Pool A

- Mongolia
- Philippines
- Kazakhstan
- Sri Lanka

Pool B

- China
- Iran
- Malaysia
- Hong Kong

Pool C

- Qatar
- Indonesia
- Chinese Taipei
- Bahrain

Pool D

- Japan (hosts)
- Singapore
- South Korea
- Thailand

=== Women ===
Pool A

- China
- Kazakhstan
- Qatar
- Sri Lanka

Pool B

- Japan (hosts)
- Chinese Taipei
- Iran
- Uzbekistan

Pool C

- Mongolia
- Philippines
- Malaysia
- Macau

Pool D

- Singapore
- Indonesia
- Thailand
- South Korea
