= 3x3 basketball at the 2026 Asian Games – Women's tournament =

Women 3x3 basketball at the 2026 Asian Games
- Venues: Kinjō-futō Station Square
- Dates: 21 – 25 September 2026
- Nations: 16

The women's 3x3 basketball tournament at the 2026 Asian Games was held in Nagoya, Aichi Prefecture, Japan from 10 to 20 September 2026.

A temporary court near the Kinjō-futō Station of the Aonami Line would set up.

The tournament was restricted to players aged 23 and under.

== Schedule ==
All times are local Japan Standard Time (UTC+9).

P	Preliminary round	Q	Quarterfinal qualifying	¼	Quarterfinals	½	Semifinals	F	Finals

21st Mon	22nd Tue	23rd Wed	24th Thu		25th Fri	
P	P	P	Q	¼	½	F

== Draw ==
The participating teams and matchups for the 3x3 basketball competition were announced on 28 July 2026.

Group A
Pos	Team
A1	China
A2	Kazakhstan
A3	Qatar
A4	Sri Lanka

Group B
Pos	Team
B1	Japan
B2	Chinese Taipei
B3	Iran
B4	Uzbekistan

Group C
Pos	Team
C1	Mongolia
C2	Philippines
C3	Malaysia
C4	Macau

Group D
Pos	Team
D1	Singapore
D2	Indonesia
D3	Thailand
D4	South Korea

== Squads ==
China	Chinese Taipei	Indonesia	Iran
Sun Fengyi; Zhang Jianping; Wang Yue; Li Wenxia	Yu Chin-hua; Tsai Yu-lien; Chen Wei-han; Chang Yu-min	Jesslyne Jaya Wiyanto; Thasya Hery Saputera; Erlina Christiana; Diva Intan Nur Fadillah	Mahla Abedi; Farnaz Khodamoradi; Mahsa Karani; Shamim Nouri
Japan	Kazakhstan	Macau	Malaysia
Yuki Hirashita; Fatoumanana Nishi; Sakura Horiuchi; Haruka Yamamoto	Karina Yuldasheva; Shugyla Kemel; Dilnaz Yerkebay; Symbat Kydyrali	Cheng Man U; Lin Weng Ha; Chang Cho Wan; Tai Un Kei	Erica Ng; Sammi Tan; Elaine Chong; Low Ler Yee
Mongolia	Philippines	Qatar	Singapore
Nyamtsetseg Batjargal; Enkhbuyan Enkhbayar; Urtnasan Chimedtseren; Khongorzul Altanzul	Kennan Ka; Amyah Espanol; Maria Pasilang; Kacey dela Rosa	Sara Al-Maadeed; Sama Gasir; Tala Taweel; Tania Taweel	Matilda Lai; Lim Lek Kar; Denise Choo; Cassandra Tay
South Korea	Sri Lanka	Thailand	Uzbekistan
Choi Ye-seul; Kim Jeong-eun; Heo Yoo-jung; Song Yun-ha	Mindi Sakeesa Jesni; Shonali Dharmasena; Senora Melani Perera; Pawani Manulya Tenali	Kwanjira Panted; Apichaya Khamkaew; Palida Naumkong; Hatthaya Kueakun	Anastasiya Lapatnikova; Gulnoza Mambetnazarova; Gulmira Kudyarova; Dilnoza Mambetnazarova

== Group phase ==
All times are local, Japan Standard Time (UTC+9).

=== Group A ===
Pos	Team	Pld	W	L	PF	PA	PD	Pts	Qualification
1	China	3	3	0	60	17	+43	6	Quarterfinals
2	Kazakhstan	3	2	1	50	34	+16	5	Play-ins
3	Sri Lanka	3	1	2	29	58	−29	4	Play-ins
4	Qatar	3	0	3	27	57	−30	3	

Source: 2026 Asian Games

22 September
17:40

Report

China	18–12	Kazakhstan
Pts: Zhang 7		Pts: Yuldasheva, Kydyrali 4

Kinjō-futō Station Square, Nagoya
Referees: Danusorn Laosaksam (THA), Liu Chee (MAS)

22 September
18:05

Report

Qatar	16–19	Sri Lanka
Pts: Gasir 8		Pts: Dharmasena 10

Kinjō-futō Station Square, Nagoya
Referees: Li Caiyan, (CHN)Liu Chee (MAS)

22 September
19:20

Report

China	21–3	Qatar
Pts: Zhang 7		Pts: Taweel 2

Kinjō-futō Station Square, Nagoya
Referees: Kim Ga-in (KOR), Danusorn Laosaksam (THA)

22 September
19:45

Report

Kazakhstan	21–8	Sri Lanka
Pts: Yuldasheva 9		Pts: Perera 6

Kinjō-futō Station Square, Nagoya
Referees: Li Caiyan (CHN), Kim Ga-in (KOR)

23 September
19:20

Report

China	21–2	Sri Lanka
Pts: Wang 8		Pts: Dharmasena 2

Kinjō-futō Station Square, Nagoya
Referees: Danusorn Laosaksam (THA), Rina Nozaki (JPN)

23 September
19:45

Report

Kazakhstan	17–8	Qatar
Pts: Yerkebay 8		Pts: Al-Maadeed, Gasir 3

Kinjō-futō Station Square, Nagoya
Referees: Rina Nozaki (JPN), Liu Chee (MAS)

=== Group B ===
Pos	Team	Pld	W	L	PF	PA	PD	Pts	Qualification
1	Iran	3	3	0	51	31	+20	6	Quarterfinals
2	Chinese Taipei	3	2	1	37	34	+3	5	Play-ins
3	Japan	3	1	2	43	41	+2	4	Play-ins
4	Uzbekistan	3	0	3	28	53	−25	3	

Source: 2026 Asian Games

21 September
17:40

Report

Japan	8–12	Chinese Taipei
Pts: Yamamoto 4		Pts: Tsai 5

Kinjō-futō Station Square, Nagoya
Referees: Alexandr Rulyov (KAZ), Liu Chee (MAS)

21 September
18:05

Report

Iran	19–5	Uzbekistan
Pts: Abedi 8		Pts: Lapatnikova 2

Kinjō-futō Station Square, Nagoya
Referees: Li Caiyan (CHN), Liu Chee (MAS)

21 September
19:45

Report

Japan	16–18	Iran
Pts: Hirashita, Nishi 5		Pts: Abedi 8

Kinjō-futō Station Square, Nagoya
Referees: Li Caiyan (CHN), Kim Ga-in (KOR)

21 September
19:20

Report

Chinese Taipei	15–12	Uzbekistan
Pts: Chang 7		Pts: Lapatnikova, Mambetnazarova 4

Kinjō-futō Station Square, Nagoya
Referees: Alexandr Rulyov (KAZ), Neoh Yuen (MAS)

23 September
14:05

Report

Japan	19–11	Uzbekistan
Pts: Hirashita 7		Pts: Lapatnikova 5

Kinjō-futō Station Square, Nagoya
Referees: Chen Kuan-i (TPE), Neoh Yuen (MAS)

23 September
13:40

Report

Chinese Taipei	10–14	Iran
Pts: Chen 4		Pts: Nouri 6

Kinjō-futō Station Square, Nagoya
Referees: Kim Ga-in (KOR), Neoh Yuen (MAS)

=== Group C ===
Pos	Team	Pld	W	L	PF	PA	PD	Pts	Qualification
1	Philippines	3	3	0	55	28	+27	6	Quarterfinals
2	Malaysia	3	2	1	43	31	+12	5	Play-ins
3	Mongolia	3	1	2	38	43	−5	4	Play-ins
4	Macau	3	0	3	16	50	−34	3	

Source: 2026 Asian Games

22 September
12:00

Report

Mongolia	12–17	Philippines
Pts: Batjargal 11		Pts: dela Rosa 10

Kinjō-futō Station Square, Nagoya
Referees: Su Yu-yen (TPE), Alexandr Rulyov (KAZ)

22 September
12:25

Report

Malaysia	14–3	Macau
Pts: Three players 4		Pts: Chang 2

Kinjō-futō Station Square, Nagoya
Referees: Chen Kuan-i (TPE), Su Yu-yen (TPE)

22 September
13:40

Report

Mongolia	11–17	Malaysia
Pts: Batjargal 8		Pts: Chong 7

Kinjō-futō Station Square, Nagoya
Referees: Chen Kuan-i (TPE), Rina Nozaki (JPN)

22 September
14:05

Report

Philippines	21–4	Macau
Pts: Pasilang 8		Pts: Tai 3

Kinjō-futō Station Square, Nagoya
Referees: Chen Kuan-i (TPE), Neoh Yuen (MAS)

23 September
17:40

Report

Mongolia	15–9	Macau
Pts: Batjargal 7		Pts: Cheng 4

Kinjō-futō Station Square, Nagoya
Referees: Rina Nozaki (JPN), Liu Chee (MAS)

23 September
18:05

Report

Philippines	17–12	Malaysia
Pts: dela Rosa 8		Pts: Chong 4

Kinjō-futō Station Square, Nagoya
Referees: Su Yu-yen (TPE), Alexandr Rulyov (KAZ)

=== Group D ===
Pos	Team	Pld	W	L	PF	PA	PD	Pts	Qualification
1	South Korea	3	3	0	56	29	+27	6	Quarterfinals
2	Thailand	3	2	1	43	25	+18	5	Play-ins
3	Singapore	3	1	2	42	49	−7	4	Play-ins
4	Indonesia	3	0	3	21	59	−38	3	

Source: 2026 Asian Games

21 September
12:00

Report

Singapore	21–13	Indonesia
Pts: Lai, Lim 7		Pts: Saputera 6

Kinjō-futō Station Square, Nagoya
Referees: Nie Cong (CHN), Chen Kuan-i (TPE)

21 September
12:25

Report

Thailand	12–13	South Korea
Pts: Naumkong 5		Pts: Heo 6

Kinjō-futō Station Square, Nagoya
Referees: Su Yu-yen (TPE), Rina Nozaki (JPN)

21 September
13:40

Report

Singapore	8–14	Thailand
Pts: Lai, Choo 3		Pts: Khamkaew 5

Kinjō-futō Station Square, Nagoya
Referees: Chen Kuan-i (TPE), Su Yu-yen (TPE)

21 September
14:05

Report

Indonesia	4–21	South Korea
Pts: Fadillah 2		Pts: Heo 10

Kinjō-futō Station Square, Nagoya
Referees: Nie Cong (CHN), Rina Nozaki (JPN)

23 September
12:00

Report

Singapore	13–22	South Korea
Pts: Lim 7		Pts: Kim 9

Kinjō-futō Station Square, Nagoya
Referees: Nie Cong (CHN), Chen Kuan-i (TPE)

23 September
12:25

Report

Indonesia	4–17	Thailand
Pts: Fadillah 2		Pts: Panted 7

Kinjō-futō Station Square, Nagoya
Referees: Nie Cong (CHN), Li Caiyan (CHN)

== Knockout round ==
All times are local, Japan Standard Time (UTC+9).

Play-ins
B2	Chinese Taipei	12
C3	Mongolia	7
C2	Malaysia	9
B3	Japan	13
D2	Thailand	21
A3	Sri Lanka	9
A2	Kazakhstan	11
D3	Singapore	14

Quarter-finals
D1	South Korea	14
B2	Chinese Taipei	12
B3	Japan	17
A1	China	16
B1	Iran	11
D2	Thailand	12
D3	Singapore	12
C1	Philippines	22

Semi-finals
D1	South Korea	8
B3	Japan	19
D2	Thailand	8
C1	Philippines	13

Gold medal game
B3	Japan	21
C1	Philippines	11
Bronze medal game
D1	South Korea	21
D2	Thailand	8

=== Play-ins ===
24 September
12:00

Report

Chinese Taipei	12–7	Mongolia
Pts: Yu 6		Pts: Batjargal 5

Kinjō-futō Station Square, Nagoya
Referees: Kim Ga-in (KOR), Danusorn Laosaksam (THA)

24 September
12:25

Report

Malaysia	9–13	Japan
Pts: Tan 4		Pts: Hirashita, Horiuchi 5

Kinjō-futō Station Square, Nagoya
Referees: Li Caiyan (CHN), Kim Ga-in (KOR)

24 September
13:40

Report

Thailand	21–9	Sri Lanka
Pts: Naumkong 10		Pts: Perera 5

Kinjō-futō Station Square, Nagoya
Referees: Chen Kuan-i (TPE), Liu Chee (MAS)

24 September
14:05

Report

Kazakhstan	11–14	Singapore
Pts: Kemel 5		Pts: Lai 8

Kinjō-futō Station Square, Nagoya
Referees: Chen Kuan-i (TPE), Liu Chee (MAS)

=== Quarterfinals ===
24 September
17:40

Report

South Korea	14–12	Chinese Taipei
Pts: Song 6		Pts: Chen, Tsai 4

Kinjō-futō Station Square, Nagoya
Referees: Rina Nozaki (JPN), Liu Chee (MAS)

24 September
18:05

Report

Japan	17–16	China
Pts: Hirashita 7		Pts: Li, Wang 5

Kinjō-futō Station Square, Nagoya
Referees: Kim Ga-in (KOR), Neoh Yuen (MAS)

24 September
19:20

Report

Iran	11–12	Thailand
Pts: Karani 6		Pts: Naumkong 5

Kinjō-futō Station Square, Nagoya
Referees: Chen Kuan-i (TPE), Liu Chee (MAS)

24 September
19:45

Report

Singapore	12–22	Philippines
Pts: Lai 6		Pts: Espanol, Ka 7

Kinjō-futō Station Square, Nagoya
Referees: Nie Cong (CHN), Su Yu-yen (TPE)

=== Semifinals ===
25 September
13:00

Report

South Korea	8–19	Japan
Pts: Kim J-e 5		Pts: Hirashita, Hiruichi 7

Kinjō-futō Station Square, Nagoya
Referees: Chen Kuan-i (TPE), Liu Chee (MAS)

25 September
13:25

Report

Thailand	8–13	Philippines
Pts: Panted 4		Pts: Pasilang 5

Kinjō-futō Station Square, Nagoya
Referees: Li Caiyan (CHN), Kim Ga-in (KOR)

=== Bronze medal game ===
25 September
18:00

Report

South Korea	21–8	Thailand
Pts: Choi Y-s 10		Pts: Panted, Palida 3

Kinjō-futō Station Square, Nagoya
Referees: Nie Cong (CHN), Rina Nozaki (JPN)

=== Gold medal game ===
25 September
19:00

Report

Japan	21–11	Philippines
Pts: Hirashita 9		Pts: dela Rosa 6

Kinjō-futō Station Square, Nagoya
Referees: Chen Kuan-i (TPE), Alexandr Rulyov (KAZ)

== Final standing ==
Rank	Team	Pld	W	L
1st place, gold medalist(s)	Japan	7	5	2
2nd place, silver medalist(s)	Philippines	6	5	1
3rd place, bronze medalist(s)	South Korea	6	5	1
4	Thailand	7	4	3
5	Chinese Taipei	5	3	2
6	China	4	3	1
7	Iran	4	3	1
8	Singapore	5	2	3
9	Kazakhstan	4	2	2
10	Malaysia	4	2	2
11	Mongolia	4	1	3
12	Sri Lanka	4	1	3
13	Uzbekistan	3	0	3
14	Qatar	3	0	3
15	Indonesia	3	0	3
16	Macau	3	0	3
