= Chinese Taipei at the 2026 Asian Games =

- IOC code: TPE
- NOC: Chinese Taipei Olympic Committee
- Website: www.tpenoc.net

in Aichi–Nagoya, Japan 19 September 2026 – 4 October 2026
- Competitors: 481 in 40 sports
- Flag bearers: Zhang Huan-yi (Wushu), Huang Hsiao-wen (Boxing)
- Medals Ranked 15th: Gold 5 Silver 17 Bronze 33 Total 55

Asian Games appearances (overview)
- 1954; 1958; 1962; 1966; 1970; 1974–1986; 1990; 1994; 1998; 2002; 2006; 2010; 2014; 2018; 2022; 2026

Taiwan, participating under the name Chinese Taipei, competed at the 2026 Asian Games in the Aichi Prefecture and Nagoya, Japan from 19 September to 4 October 2026.

== Background ==
The Ministry of Sports of Taiwan announced on 14 July 2026 that Chinese Taipei will be represented by 482 athletes competing in 34 sports. Preparations for the games started as early as 2024.

Athletics has the largest delegation with 37 competitors. Followed by esports with 32.

There was controversy, when Chinese Taipei did not use three quota places it obtained in sports climbing as well as its two quota places for male athletes in surfing.

== Competitors ==
The following is a list of the number of competitors representing Chinese Taipei who participated at the Asian Games:

Sport	Men	Women	Total
3x3 basketball	4	4	8
Archery	6	6	12
Athletics	22	15	37
Badminton	10	10	20
Baseball	24	0	24
Basketball	12	12	12
Boxing	3	4	7
Breaking	2	2	4
Canoeing	7	3	10
Cycling	8	8	16
Diving	0	2	2
Equestrian	5	3	8
Esports	32	1	33
Fencing	8	0	8
Football	0	23	23
Golf	3	3	6
Gymnastics	5	10	15
Hockey	0	19	19
Judo	4	6	10
Ju-jitsu	1	1	2
Kabaddi	12	12	24
Karate	5	5	10
Kurash	3	4	7
Mixed martial arts	2	1	3
Rowing	0	3	3
Sailing	1	0	1
Shooting	6	12	18
Skateboarding	1	1	2
Softball	0	17	17
Soft tennis	5	5	10
Surfing	0	2	2
Swimming	10	5	15
Table tennis	5	5	10
Taewondo	4	5	9
Tennis	6	6	12
Triathlon	2	2	4
Volleyball	12	12	24
Weightlifting	5	5	10
Wrestling	0	4	4
Wushu	6	4	10
Total	240	241	481

== Archery ==
Men

- Cheng Hsiang-hui
- Lin Zih-siang
- Tang Chih-chun

Women

- Fong You-jhu
- Hsu Hsin-tzu
- Lee Tsai-chi

== Badminton ==
Chinese Taipei entered 20 athletes into the Games.

Men

Athlete	Event	Round of 64	Round of 32	Round of 16	Quarter-finals	Semi-finals	Final	
Athlete	Event	Opposition Score	Opposition Score	Opposition Score	Opposition Score	Opposition Score	Opposition Score	Rank
Chou Tien-chen	Singles	Bye	Jaman (BAN); W 21–1, 21–10	Shetty (IND); W 21–16, 19–21, 21–17	Farhan (INA); L 10–21, 11–21	Did not advance		
Lin Chun-yi	Singles	Jargalsaikhan (MGL); W 21–10, 21–9	Yoo (KOR); L 10–21, 12–21	Did not advance				
Lee Jhe-huei; Yang Po-hsuan	Doubles	—N/a	He / Liu (CHN); W 21–15, 21–19	Kumagai / Nishi (JPN); L 22–20, 17–21, 12–21	Did not advance			
Chiu Hsiang-chieh; Wang Chi-lin	Doubles	—N/a	Goh / Izzuddin (MAS); L 17–21, 14–21	Did not advance				
Chou Tien-chen; Lin Chun-yi; Chi Yu-jen; Wang Tzu-wei; Chiu Hsiang-chieh; Wang Chi-lin; Lee Jhe-huei; Yang Po-hsuan; Ye Hong-wei; Liu Kuang-heng	Team	—N/a		Bye	Thailand (THA); L 1–3	Did not advance		

Women

Athlete	Event	Round of 64	Round of 32	Round of 16	Quarter-finals	Semi-finals	Final	
Athlete	Event	Opposition Score	Opposition Score	Opposition Score	Opposition Score	Opposition Score	Opposition Score	Rank
Chiu Pin-chian	Singles	Letshanaa (MAS); W 21–13, 21–13	Sindhu (IND); L 19–21, 14–21	Did not advance				
Lin Hsiang-ti	Singles	Bye	Chochuwong (THA); W 21–14, 21–16	Lo (HKG); W 21–19, 7–21, 21–15	Wang (CHN); L 7–21, 12–21	Did not advance		
Hsieh Pei-shan; Hung En-tzu	Doubles	—N/a	Odbayar / Tselmeg-od (MGL); W 21–4, 21–5	Kuleshova / Namenova (KAZ); W 21–10, 21–5	Liu / Tan (CHN); L 15–21, 15–21	Did not advance		
Hsu Yin-hui; Lin Jhih-yun	Doubles	—N/a	Low / Maisarah (MAS); W 21–10, 21–13	Rakhmetullayeva / Smagulova (KAZ); W 21–8, 21–5	Baek / Lee (KOR); L 20–22, 17–21	Did not advance		
Chiu Pin-chian; Lin Hsiang-ti; Huang Yu-hsun; Sung Shuo-yun; Hsieh Pei-shan; Hung En-tzu; Hsu Yin-hui; Lin Jhih-yun; Hu Ling-fang; Nicole Gonzales Chan	Team	—N/a		Bye	Indonesia (INA); L 1–3	Did not advance		

Mixed

Athlete	Event	Round of 32	Round of 16	Quarter-finals	Semi-finals	Final	
Athlete	Event	Opposition Score	Opposition Score	Opposition Score	Opposition Score	Opposition Score	Rank
Yang Po-hsuan; Hu Ling-fang	Doubles	Goh / Lai (MAS); L 14–21, 11–21	Did not advance				
Ye Hong-wei; Nicole Gonzales Chan	Doubles	P Maharjan / R Maharjan (NEP); W 21–14, 21–9	Shimogami / Hobara (JPN); W 21–10, 21–15	Oupthong / Sudjaipraparat (THA); W 21–18, 21–14	Jiang / Wei (CHN); L 13–21, 9–21	Did not advance	3rd place, bronze medalist(s)

== Basketball ==
Summary

Team	Event	Group Stage				Play-in	Quarterfinals	Semifinals	Final / BM	
Team	Event	Opposition Score	Opposition Score	Opposition Score	Opposition Score	Rank	Opposition Score	Opposition Score	Opposition Score	Rank
Chinese Taipei men's	Men's tournament	Jordan; W 83–80	Iran; L 69–72	Qatar; W 91–69	2 Q	—N/a	Japan; L 78–85	Did not advance		5
Chinese Taipei women's	Women's tournament	Mongolia; W 76–67	Malaysia; W 98–59	South Korea; L 59–73	2 Q	—N/a	Philippines; W 83–71	Japan; L 52–80	Bronze medal Match; China; L 64–77	4
Chinese Taipei men's	Men's 3x3 tournament	Bahrain; W 21–2	Qatar; L 15–18	Indonesia; W 22–17	2 Q	Malaysia; W 21–14	Philippines; L 19–21	Did not advance		5
Chinese Taipei women's	Women's 3x3 tournament	Japan; W 12–8	Uzbekistan; W 15–12	Iran; L 10–14	2 Q	Mongolia; W 12–7	South Korea; L 14–12	Did not advance		7

=== 5x5 basketball ===
==== Men's tournament ====
Team roster

- Lin Ting-chien
- Ma Chien-hao
- Yu Ai-che
- Chen Ying-chun
- Hu Long-mao
- Li Chia-kang
- Samuel Manu
- Brandon Gilbeck
- Lu Chun-hsiang
- Jonah Morrison
- Chen Kuan-chuan
- Tseng Hsiang-chun

Preliminary Rounds – Group B

Pos	Team	Pld	W	L	PF	PA	PD	Pts	Qualification
1	Iran	3	2	1	206	196	+10	5 (Note: Iran 1–0 Chinese Taipei)	Quarterfinals
2	Chinese Taipei	3	2	1	243	221	+22	5	Quarterfinals
3	Jordan	3	1	2	224	229	−5	4 (Note: Jordan 1–0 Qatar)	Quarterfinals
4	Qatar	3	1	2	193	220	−27	4	

Source: AsianGames2026.org
Notes:

10 September 2026
13:00

Report
Box score

Jordan	80–83	Chinese Taipei
Scoring by quarter: 13–17, 23–29, 19–14, 25–23
Pts: Buford, Olajuwon 18; Rebs: Buford, Tucker 8 Asts: Ibrahim 6		Pts: Chen Y. 16; Rebs: Gilbeck 9 Asts: Chen Y. 5

Aichi International Arena, Nagoya
Referees: Glenn Cornelio (PHI), Lee Ji-youn (KOR), Abdullah Al-Hejaili (KSA)

12 September 2026
10:00

Report
Box score

Chinese Taipei	69–72	Iran
Scoring by quarter: 17–13, 10–15, 23–21, 19–23
Pts: Chen Y. 29; Rebs: Gilbeck 7 Asts: Yu 10		Pts: Jamshidi 18; Rebs: Zangeneh 7 Asts: Jafari 5

Aichi International Arena, Nagoya
Attendance: 8,555
Referees: Glenn Cornelio (PHI), Rakesh Ramalingaiah (IND), Yana Nikogossyan (KAZ)

13 September 2026
13:00

Report
Box score

Chinese Taipei	91–69	Qatar
Scoring by quarter: 26–12, 20–15, 22–18, 23–24
Pts: Lin 21; Rebs: Gilbeck 9 Asts: Chen Y. 9		Pts: Janjić 15; Rebs: Arfa, Janjić 9 Asts: Saad 4

Aichi International Arena, Nagoya
Attendance: 8,355
Referees: Wissam Zein (SYR) , Shigeyuki Arisawa (JPN), Lee Ji-youn (KOR)

Quarterfinals

16 September 2026
19:20

Report
Box score

Chinese Taipei	78–85	Japan
Scoring by quarter: 9–16, 23–28, 17–24, 29–17
Pts: Chen Y. 20; Rebs: Gilbeck 10; Asts: Gilbeck, Manu 4		Pts: Kurokawa 23; Rebs: Kirk 8 Asts: Ogawa 7

Aichi International Arena, Nagoya
Attendance: 5,504
Referees: Wissam Zein (SYR), Budi Marfan (INA), Glenn Cornelio (PHI)

==== Women's tournament ====
Team rosters

- Chen Yen-ju
- Liu Hui-ju
- Lin Wen-yu
- Han Ya-en
- Hsiao Yu-wen
- Huang Hsiang-ting
- Cheng I-hsiu
- Huang Ling-chuan
- Lin Yu-ting
- Peng Szu-chin
- Lin Tieh
- Peng Hsiao-tong

Preliminary Rounds – Group C

Pos	Team	Pld	W	L	PF	PA	PD	Pts	Qualification
1	South Korea	3	3	0	267	160	+107	6	Quarterfinals
2	Chinese Taipei	3	2	1	233	199	+34	5	Quarterfinals
3	Mongolia	3	1	2	217	245	−28	4	Quarterfinals
4	Malaysia	3	0	3	180	293	−113	3	

Source: aichi-nagoya2026.org

18 September 2026
13:00

Report

Chinese Taipei	76–67	Mongolia
Scoring by quarter: 23–19, 18–27, 18–10, 17–11
Pts: Peng S. 15; Rebs: Hsiao 11; Asts: Peng H. 6		Pts: Robinson 25; Rebs: Robinson 13; Asts: O. Khulan 3

Aichi International Arena, Nagoya
Attendance: 7,791
Referees: Shigeyuki Arisawa (JPN), Mahsa Kargari (IRI), Rakesh RamalingaiaH (IND)

21 September 2026
16:00

Report

Malaysia	59–98	Chinese Taipei
Scoring by quarter: 13–18, 11–32, 16–25, 19–23
Pts: Tan P. J. 19; Rebs: Sammi, Chia 5 Asts: Foo, Chong 3		Pts: Han 14; Rebs: Hsiao 14; Asts: Lin Y. T. 11

Aichi International Arena, Nagoya
Attendance: 3,863
Referees: Budi Marfan (INA), Ami Takano (JPN), Mahsa Kargari (IRI)

22 September 2026
16:00

Report

South Korea	73–59	Chinese Taipei
Scoring by quarter: 20–17, 22–12, 17–12, 14–18
Pts: Choi 17; Rebs: Lee S.-h. 9 Asts: Heo 6		Pts: Lin Y. T. 12; Rebs: Hsiao 6 Asts: Lin Y. T. 6

Aichi International Arena, Nagoya
Attendance: 5,883
Referees: Yana Nikogossyan (KAZ), Wissam Zein (SYR), Shigeyuki Arisawa (JPN)

Quarterfinals

24 September 2026
16:00

Report

Chinese Taipei	83–71	Philippines
Scoring by quarter: 15–9, 27–25, 23–22, 18–15
Pts: Hsiao 14; Rebs: Hsiao 17; Asts: Peng S. 5		Pts: Bernardino 23; Rebs: Bernardino 7 Asts: Berberabe 4

Aichi International Arena, Nagoya
Attendance: 2,137
Referees: Rabah Noujaim (LBN), Yana Nikogossyan (KAZ), Abdullah Alhejaili (KSA)

Semifinals

25 September 2026
19:20

Report

Chinese Taipei	52–80	Japan
Scoring by quarter: 11–20, 16–19, 13–23, 12–18
Pts: Lin Y. T. 9 Rebs: Hsiao Y. W. 7 Asts: Lin Y. T. 4		Pts: Miura 16; Rebs: Tanaka 10; Asts: Akagi 7

Aichi International Arena, Nagoya
Attendance: 3,593
Referees: Mahsa Kargari (IRN), Budi Marfan (INA), Mandy Ngieng (MAS)

=== 3x3 basketball ===
==== Men's tournament ====
Preliminary Rounds – Group C

Pos	Team	Pld	W	L	PF	PA	PD	Pts	Qualification
1	Qatar	3	3	0	49	37	+12	6	Quarterfinals
2	Chinese Taipei	3	2	1	58	37	+21	5	Play-ins
3	Indonesia	3	1	2	38	42	−4	4	Play-ins
4	Bahrain	3	0	3	27	56	−29	3	

Source: asiangames2026.org

21 September
18:55

Report

Chinese Taipei	21–2	Bahrain
Pts: Chang 9		Pts: Alanzoor 2

Kinjō-futō Station Square, Nagoya
Referees: Neoh Yuen (MAS), Liu Chee (MAS)

21 September
20:10

Report

Qatar	18–15	Chinese Taipei
Pts: Mousa 10		Pts: Chang 9

Kinjō-futō Station Square, Nagoya
Referees: Alexandr Rulyov (KAZ), Neoh Yuen (MAS)

23 September
14:55

Report

Indonesia	17–22	Chinese Taipei
Pts: Dhoifullah 9		Pts: Hsu 10

Kinjō-futō Station Square, Nagoya
Referees: Neoh Yuen (MAS), Kim Gain (KOR)

Play-ins

24 September
12:50

Report

Chinese Taipei	21–14	Malaysia
Pts: Yeh, Chang 7		Pts: Chong 6

Kinjō-futō Station Square, Nagoya
Referees: Rina Nozaki (JPN), Alexandr Rulyov (KAZ)

Quarterfinals

24 September
18:30

Report

Philippines	21–19	Chinese Taipei
Pts: Cabañero 8		Pts: Yeh 10

Kinjō-futō Station Square, Nagoya
Referees: Kim Ga-in (KOR), Danusorn Laosaksam (THA)

==== Women's tournament ====
Preliminary Rounds – Group B

Pos	Team	Pld	W	L	PF	PA	PD	Pts	Qualification
1	Iran	3	3	0	51	31	+20	6	Quarterfinals
2	Chinese Taipei	3	2	1	37	34	+3	5	Play-ins
3	Japan	3	1	2	43	41	+2	4	Play-ins
4	Uzbekistan	3	0	3	28	53	−25	3	

Source: 2026 Asian Games

21 September
17:40

Report

Japan	8–12	Chinese Taipei
Pts: Yamamoto 4		Pts: Tsai 5

Kinjō-futō Station Square, Nagoya
Referees: Alexandr Rulyov (KAZ), Liu Chee (MAS)

21 September
19:45

Report

Japan	16–18	Iran
Pts: Hirashita, Nishi 5		Pts: Abedi 8

Kinjō-futō Station Square, Nagoya
Referees: Li Caiyan (CHN), Kim Ga-in (KOR)

23 September
14:05

Report

Japan	19–11	Uzbekistan
Pts: Hirashita 7		Pts: Lapatnikova 5

Kinjō-futō Station Square, Nagoya
Referees: Chen Kuan-i (TPE), Neoh Yuen (MAS)

== Esports ==
Chinese Taipei will take part in seven events in esports. It took part in qualification tournaments to secure berths for Identity V, and Naraka: Bladepoint. As silver medalist of the League of Legends (LoL) and the bronze medalist of the PUBG Mobile tournaments of the 2022 Asian Games, Chinese Taipei has already qualified for the 2026 Asian Games LoL and PUBG tournaments. Additionally, Chinese Taipei will participate in Pokémon Unite and Puyo Puyo Champions.

== Field hockey ==
Summary

Key:

- s.o. – Match decided by Penalty shoot-out.

Team	Event	Group Stage						Semi-final	Pl		
Team	Event	Opposition Result	Opposition Result	Opposition Result	Opposition Result	Opposition Result	Rank	Opposition Result	Opposition Result	Opposition Result	Rank
Women's team	Women's tournament	South Korea; L 1–3	China; L 0–10	Kazakhstan; W 4–1	Malaysia; L 0–5	Bangladesh; W 3–2	4	Did not advance	Thailand; L 1–2	Indonesia; D 1–1 (4–3 s.o.)	7

Women's tournament

Team squads

The following is the Chinese Taipei roster in the women's field hockey tournament of the 2026 Asian Games.

Head coach: (Chinese Taipei) Lin Min Nan

2. Wang Yu-Chiu
3. Tsai Chen Wei
5. Liao Pei-Shan
7. Huang Pei-Lun
8. Chen Ting-Chun
9. Yang Wan Wen
10. Pu Agustin-Linmey (C)
11. Fan Hui-Yun
12. Lai Ya-Han
13. Chang, Tzu-Ling
14. Mao I-Hsuan
15. Huang Yu-Ting
17. Zhu Yi-Chun
18. Lo Tzu-Yin (GK)
19. Wang Shih-Han
20. Ye Shu-Qin
23. Chang Chih-Hsien
24. Wang Wen-Tsen
26. Yao Wen-Xuan (GK)

Preliminary round

Pos	Team	Pld	W	D	L	GF	GA	GD	Pts	Qualification
1	China	5	5	0	0	46	0	+46	15	Semi-finals
2	South Korea	5	4	0	1	20	5	+15	12	Semi-finals
3	Malaysia	5	3	0	2	14	7	+7	9	Fifth place classification
4	Chinese Taipei	5	2	0	3	8	21	−13	6	Fifth place classification
5	Bangladesh	5	0	1	4	6	30	−24	1	Ninth place game
6	Kazakhstan	5	0	1	4	4	35	−31	1	Eleventh place game

Source: FIH
Rules for classification: 1) points; 2) matches won; 3) goal difference; 4) goals for; 5) head-to-head result; 6) field goals for.

18 September 2026
13:00

South Korea	3–1	Chinese Taipei
Park Seu. 13', 33'; An 42'	Report	Wang W. 41'

Gifu Prefectural Green Stadium
Umpires:
Binish Hayat (PAK)
Aleisha Neumann (AUS)

21 September 2026
11:00

China	10–0	Chinese Taipei
Chen Yi 7', 32', 32'; Zhong 23', 34'; Zhang 39'; Ma 54'; Fan 55'; Chen Ya. 57'; Yu 58'	Report

Gifu Prefectural Green Stadium
Umpires:
Rama Potnis (IND)
Laurine Delforge (BEL)

23 September 2026
13:00

Kazakhstan	1–4	Chinese Taipei
Lobanova 31'	Report	Huang 5', 60'; Fan 32'; Wang Y. 58'

Gifu Prefectural Green Stadium
Umpires:
Kelly Hudson (NZL)
Yu Tian (CHN)

25 September 2026
19:00

Chinese Taipei	0–5	Malaysia
	Report	Mohd 9'; Shaikh 10'; Zulkifli 12'; Husain 15+', 50'

Gifu Prefectural Green Stadium
Umpires:
Liu Xiaoying (CHN)
Zarina Ilyassova (KAZ)

27 September 2026
13:00

Chinese Taipei	3–2	Bangladesh
Huang 6', 49'; Wang Y. 45'	Report	Akter 19', 24'

Gifu Prefectural Green Stadium
Umpires:
Yu Tian (CHN)
Rinky See (HKG)

Fifth place Crossover

30 September 2026
14:00

Thailand	2–1	Chinese Taipei
Smeelen 13'; Inpa 47'	Report	Huang 38'

Gifu Prefectural Green Stadium
Umpires:
Kelly Hudson (NZL)
Rama Potnis (IND)

Seventh place match

2 October 2026
11:30

Indonesia	1–1	Chinese Taipei
Aditiya 40'	Report; SO Report	Lai 5'
Penalties
Lispa (penalty shoot-out missed); Rahayu (penalty shoot-out missed); Indira (penalty shoot-out scored); Prasasti (penalty shoot-out scored); Aditiya (penalty shoot-out scored); Indira (penalty shoot-out missed); Prasasti (penalty shoot-out missed)	3–4	(penalty shoot-out missed) Huang; (penalty shoot-out scored) Lai; (penalty shoot-out scored) Wang; (penalty shoot-out scored) Chang; (penalty shoot-out missed) Fan; (penalty shoot-out missed) Wang; (penalty shoot-out scored) Chang

Gifu Prefectural Green Stadium
Umpires:
Rama Potnis (IND)
Cookie Tan (SGP)

== Football ==
Summary

Key:

- A.E.T – After extra time.
- P – Match decided by penalty-shootout.

Team	Event	Group Stage				Quarterfinals	Semifinals	Final / BM	
Team	Event	Opposition Score	Opposition Score	Opposition Score	Rank	Opposition Score	Opposition Score	Opposition Score	Rank
Chinese Taipei women's	Women's tournament	Vietnam; W 2–1	Thailand; W 1–0	Japan; L 0–4	2 Q	North Korea; L 1–5	Did not advance		5

=== Women's tournament ===
Team squads

The following players list is the Chinese Taipei squad for the 2026 Asian Games.

Head Coach: (Belgium) Patrick De Wilde

No.	Pos.	Player	Date of birth (age)	Club
1	GK	Wang Yu-ting	27 May 2001 (age 25)	(Chinese Taipei Football Association) Hang Yuan
18	GK	Cheng Ssu-yu	25 September 1989 (age 37)	(Chinese Taipei Football Association) Hualien
23	GK	Liu Ying-chia	1 September 2005 (age 21)	(United States Soccer Federation) Eastern Kentucky Colonels
2	DF	Chang Chi-lan	18 September 1996 (age 30)	(Chinese Taipei Football Association) Kaohsiung Attackers
3	DF	Pan Shin-yu	3 May 1997 (age 29)	(Chinese Taipei Football Association) Kaohsiung Attackers
4	DF	Lin Jing-xuan	11 May 2005 (age 21)	(Chinese Taipei Football Association) Taichung Blue Whale
7	DF	Minori Wakabayashi	1 June 1993 (age 33)	(Chinese Taipei Football Association) Kaohsiung Attackers
20	DF	Chen Ying-hui	5 October 1998 (age 28)	(Chinese Taipei Football Association) Taichung Blue Whale
22	DF	Huang Ke-sin	18 July 2003 (age 23)	(Chinese Taipei Football Association) Taichung Blue Whale
6	MF	Chuan Tzu-yu	4 November 2008 (age 17)	(Chinese Taipei Football Association) Taipei Bravo
8	MF	Maho Tanaka	4 March 2001 (age 25)	(Chinese Taipei Football Association) Taichung Blue Whale
9	MF	Hsu Yi-yun	29 April 1997 (age 29)	(Chinese Taipei Football Association) AC Taipei
10	MF	Saki Matsunaga	26 December 1995 (age 30)	(Chinese Taipei Football Association) Hang Yuan
13	MF	Pan Yen-hsin	18 February 1996 (age 30)	(Chinese Taipei Football Association) Hang Yuan
14	MF	Wu Kai-ching	14 November 1999 (age 26)	(Chinese Taipei Football Association) Kaohsiung Attackers
15	MF	Tseng Yun-ching	14 February 2000 (age 26)	(Chinese Taipei Football Association) AC Taipei
5	FW	Liao Jie-ning	24 September 2008 (age 18)	(Chinese Taipei Football Association) Meimei
11	FW	He Jia-shiuan	7 May 2005 (age 21)	(Chinese Taipei Football Association) Hang Yuan
12	FW	Lin Hsin-hui	6 February 2002 (age 24)	(Chinese Football Association) Guangxi Pingguo
16	FW	Liu Yu-chiao	14 December 2005 (age 20)	(Chinese Taipei Football Association) Hang Yuan
17	FW	Chen Jin-wen	13 June 2003 (age 23)	(Chinese Taipei Football Association) Taichung Blue Whale
19	FW	Su Yu-hsuan	21 February 2001 (age 25)	(Chinese Football Association) Hangzhou WFC
21	FW	Chen Yu-chin	5 August 2007 (age 19)	(Chinese Taipei Football Association) Hang Yuan

Preliminary rounds – Group E

Pos	Team	Pld	W	D	L	GF	GA	GD	Pts	Qualification
1	Japan (H)	3	3	0	0	20	0	+20	9	Advance to knockout stage
2	Chinese Taipei	3	2	0	1	3	5	−2	6	Advance to knockout stage
3	Vietnam	3	0	1	2	1	10	−9	1	Advance to knockout stage
4	Thailand	3	0	1	2	0	9	−9	1	

Source: Aichi–Nagoya 26
(H) Hosts

14 September 2026
16:00

Chinese Taipei	2–1	Vietnam
Su Yu-hsuan 16'; Wakabayashi 81'	Report	Nguyễn Thị Thanh Nhã 86'

Shizuoka Stadium, Fukuroi
Attendance: 352
Referee: Park Se-jin (South Korea)

17 September 2026
16:00

Thailand	0–1	Chinese Taipei
	Report	Tanaka 78'

Shizuoka Stadium, Fukuroi
Attendance: 277
Referee: Rawdha Al-Mansoori (United Arab Emirates)

21 September 2026
19:30

Japan	4–0	Chinese Taipei
Takarada 7' (pen.); Kamiya 20'; Ueno 51'; Ikuta 58'	Report

Shizuoka Stadium, Fukuroi
Attendance: 3,679
Referee: Khin Nyein Chan (Myanmar)

Quarter-finals

25 September 2026
15:00

North Korea	5–1	Chinese Taipei
Song Chun-sim 21'; Myong Yu-jong 29'; Kim Kyong-yong 34'; Choe Kum-ok 64'; Kim Song-gyong 86'	Report	Chen Yu-chin 90+2'

Shizuoka Stadium, Fukuroi
Attendance: 477
Referee: Veronika Bernatskaia (Kyrgyzstan)

== Karate ==
Men

Athlete	Event	Round of 32	Round of 16	Quarterfinals	Semifinals	Repechage	Final / BM	
Athlete	Event	Opposition Result	Opposition Result	Opposition Result	Opposition Result	Opposition Result	Opposition Result	Rank
Tu Cheng-han	Individual kata	—N/a	Bye	Fong MH (MAC); L 0–5	Did not advance	Henry (MAS); L 0–5	Did not advance	
Chang Yun-hsiang; Li Hsiang-shuan; Tu Cheng-han	Team kata	—N/a		Cambodia; W 4–1	Macau; L 0–5	—N/a	Hong Kong; L 2–3	5
Shih Cheng-chung	–67 kg	Sultonov (TJK); W 4–3	Darwish (SYR); W 5–1	Al-Natsheh (QAT); W 6–5	Kozaki (JPN); L 2–5	—N/a	Khuất (VIE); W 9–3	3rd place, bronze medalist(s)
Chung Meng-yu	–84 kg	—N/a		Al-Jafari (JOR); L 1–4	Did not advance	—N/a	Bhatt (IND); W 1–1	3rd place, bronze medalist(s)

Women

Athlete	Event	Round of 16	Quarterfinals	Semifinals	Repechage	Final / BM	
Athlete	Event	Opposition Result	Opposition Result	Opposition Result	Opposition Result	Opposition Result	Rank
Chien Hui-hsuan	Individual kata	Damayanti (INA); W 4–1	Torres (PHI); W 4–1	Lau (HKG); L 0–5	—N/a	Sadeghi (IRI); W 4–1	3rd place, bronze medalist(s)
Chien Hui-hsuan; Hung Chih-hsuan; Tien Hsin-erh	Team kata	—N/a	Macau; W 5–0	Vietnam; L 0–5	—N/a	Nepal; W 5–0	3rd place, bronze medalist(s)
Chung Ya-chi	–50 kg	Al-Sultan (TPE); W 3–1	Tsang YT (HKG); L 0–6	Did not advance			
Ku Tsui-ping	–55 kg	Bye	Samasheva (KAZ); L 0–2	Did not advance			

== Shooting ==
=== Men ===
Individual

Athlete	Event	Qualification		Final	
Athlete	Event	Points	Rank	Points	Rank
Hsieh Hsiang-chen	10 m air pistol	575-8x	19	Did not advance	
Yeh Ting-wei	10 m air pistol	569-16x	32	Did not advance	
Yang Kun-pi	Trap	123	1 Q	25	2nd place, silver medalist(s)
Lee Meng-yuan	Skeet	120	2 Q	29	3rd place, bronze medalist(s)
Wang Han-tsun	Skeet	112	26	Did not advance	
Zhang Feng-qi	Skeet	113	22	Did not advance	

Team

Athlete	Event	Final	
Athlete	Event	Points	Rank
Lee Meng-yuan; Wang Han-tsun; Zhang Feng-qi	Skeet	345	5

=== Women ===
Individual

Athlete	Event	Qualification		Final	
Athlete	Event	Points	Rank	Points	Rank
Cheng Yen-ching	10 m air pistol	575-18x	9 Q	200.7	4
Cheng Yen-ching	25 m pistol	580-20x	9	Did not advance	
Wu Chia-ying	10 m air pistol	571-9x	19	Did not advance	
Yu Ai-wen	10 m air pistol	572-12x	17	Did not advance	
Chen Yu-ju	25 m pistol	571-9x	26	Did not advance	
Tien Chia-chen	25 m pistol	583-19x	5 Q	15	6
Chou Ya-hsuan	10 m air rifle	626.6	23	Did not advance	
Lin Ying-shin	10 m air rifle	620.6	41	Did not advance	
Sung Yu-ting	10 m air rifle	626.6	24	Did not advance	
Sung Yu-ting	50 m rifle 3 position	567-23x	41	Did not advance	
Chen Chi	50 m rifle 3 position	582-22x	24	Did not advance	
Lin Yi-chun	Trap	115	5 Q	12	6
Liu Wan-yu	Trap	115	6 Q	6	7
Lo Chien-ya	Skeet	99	24	Did not advance	

Team

Athlete	Event	Final	
Athlete	Event	Points	Rank
Cheng Yen-ching; Wu Chia-ying; Yu Ai-wen	10 m air pistol	1718-39x	5
Chen Yun-ju; Cheng Yen-ching; Tien Chia-chen	25 m pistol	1734-48x	3rd place, bronze medalist(s)
Chou Ya-hsuan; Lin Ying-shin; Sung Yu-ting	10 m air rifle	1873.8	11

=== Mixed ===
Team

Athlete	Event	Qualification		Final	
Athlete	Event	Points	Rank	Points	Rank
Cheng Yen-ching; Hsieh Hsiang-chen	10 m air pistol	572-16x	11	Did not advance	
Liu Wan-yu; Yang Kun-pi	Trap	134	5	Did not advance	
Lee Meng-yuan; Lo Chien-ya	Skeet	128	10	Did not advance	

== Soft tennis ==
Men

Athlete	Event	Group stage				Quarter-finals	Semi-finals	Final / BM	
Athlete	Event	Opposition Score	Opposition Score	Opposition Score	Rank	Opposition Score	Opposition Score	Opposition Score	Rank
Chen Po-yi	Singles	Altangerel (MGL); W 4–0	Thakur (IND); W 4–0	—N/a	1 Q	Lee (KOR); W 4–2	Uematsu (JPN); L 2–4	Did not advance	3rd place, bronze medalist(s)
Chang Yu-sung	Singles	Bhandari (NEP); W 4–0	Louangsisombath (LAO); W 4–0	—N/a	1 Q	Kurosaka (JPN); L 2–4	Did not advance		5
Chang Yu-sung; Chen Po-yi; Chen Yu-hsun; Lin Wei-chieh; Yu Kai-wen	Team	Mongolia; W 3–0	India; W 3–0	Laos; W 3–0	1 Q	Bye	South Korea; W 2–1	Japan; L 0–2	2nd place, silver medalist(s)

Women

Athlete	Event	Group stage				Quarter-finals	Semi-finals	Final / BM	
Athlete	Event	Opposition Score	Opposition Score	Opposition Score	Rank	Opposition Score	Opposition Score	Opposition Score	Rank
Chiang Min-yu	Singles	Chhan (CAM); W 4–0	Arasy (INA); W 4–1	—N/a	1 Q	Miyamae (JPN); L 2–4	Did not advance		5
Huang Shih-yuan	Singles	Meth (CAM); W 4–0	Lee (KOR); L 2–4	—N/a	2	Did not advance			9
Chiang Min-yu; Huang Shih-yuan; Hsu Chiao-ying; Lo Shu-ting; Zhou Yan-zhen	Team	Thailand; W 3–0	Mongolia; W 3–0	Philippines; W 3–0	1 Q	—N/a	South Korea; W 2–1	Japan; L 1–2	2nd place, silver medalist(s)

Mixed

Athlete	Event	Group stage			Round of 16	Quarter-finals	Semi-finals	Final / BM	
Athlete	Event	Opposition Score	Opposition Score	Rank	Opposition Score	Opposition Score	Opposition Score	Opposition Score	Rank
Yu Kai-wen; Huang Shih-yuan	Doubles	Bhandari / Chaudhary (NEP); W 5–0	Khurelbayar / Ganbold (MGL); W 5–0	1 Q	Bye	Sanosa / Nuguit (PHI); W 5–0	Maeda / Maruyama (JPN); W 5–0	Temma / Uematsu (JPN); W 5–4	1st place, gold medalist(s)
Lin Wei-chieh; Chiang Min-yu	Doubles	Laluyan / Nafiiah (INA); W 5–2	Bashir / Khan (PAK); W 5–0	1 Q	Bye	Park / Kim (KOR); L 4–5	Did not advance		5

== Table tennis ==
Men

Athlete	Event	Round of 64	Round of 32	Round of 16	Quarterfinal	Semifinal	Final / BM	
Athlete	Event	Opposition Result	Opposition Result	Opposition Result	Opposition Result	Opposition Result	Opposition Result	Rank
Lin Yun-ju	Singles	Bye	Rashed (BRN); W 4–0	Gerassimenko (KAZ); W 4–0	Chan (HKG); W 4–1	Lin (CHN); L 3–4	Did not advance	3rd place, bronze medalist(s)
Feng Yi-hsin	Singles	Bye	Choong (MAS); W 4–1	Jang (KOR); W 4–0	Wang (CHN); L 0–4	Did not advance		5
Feng Yi-hsin; Kuo Guan-hong	Doubles	Bye	Hagberg / Vongsa (LAO); W 3–0	Gerassimenko / Kurmangaliyev (KAZ); W 3–0	Lin / Huang (CHN); L 0–3	Did not advance		5
Hung Jing-kai; Hsu Hsien-chia	Doubles	Bye	Saleh / Rashed (BRN); W 3–0	Harimoto / Shinozuka (JPN); L 1–3	Did not advance			9

Women

Athlete	Event	Round of 64	Round of 32	Round of 16	Quarterfinal	Semifinal	Final / BM	
Athlete	Event	Opposition Result	Opposition Result	Opposition Result	Opposition Result	Opposition Result	Opposition Result	Rank
Chen Szu-yu	Singles	Shrestha (NEP); W 4–1	Zhu (MAC); L 2–4	Did not advance				17
Cheng I-ching	Singles	Bye	Kim (PRK); L 3–4	Did not advance				17
Chen Szu-yu; Wu Ying-syuan	Doubles	Bye	Leong / Kuan (MAC); W 3–1	Hayata / Harimoto (JPN); L 0–3	Did not advance			9
Cheng I-ching; Yeh Yi-tian	Doubles	Bye	Choe / Pyon (PRK); W 3–1	Sawettabut / Paranang (THA); L 0–3	Did not advance			9

Mixed

Athlete	Event	Round of 64	Round of 32	Round of 16	Quarterfinal	Semifinal	Final / BM	
Athlete	Event	Opposition Result	Opposition Result	Opposition Result	Opposition Result	Opposition Result	Opposition Result	Rank
Cheng I-ching; Lin Yun-ju	Doubles	Bye	Kasymov / Aiazbekova (KGZ); W 3–0	Shinozuka / Ito (JPN); W 3–0	Shin / Lim (KOR); L 2–3	Did not advance		5
Feng Yi-hsin; Yeh Yi-tian	Doubles	Gerassimenko / Akasheva (KAZ); W 3–1	Quek / Loy (SGP); W 3–0	Wang CQ / Sun YS (CHN); L 0–3	Did not advance			9

Team

Athlete	Event	Group stage			Round of 16	Quarterfinal	Semifinal	Final	
Athlete	Event	Opposition Score	Opposition Score	Rank	Opposition Score	Opposition Score	Opposition Score	Opposition Score	Rank
Feng Yi-hsin; Hsu Hsien-chia; Hung Jing-kai; Kuo Guan-hong; Lin Yun-ju	Men's	Nepal; W 3–0	Bahrain; W 3–0	1 Q	Mongolia; W 3–0	Iran; W 3–0	China; L 0–3	Did not advance	3rd place, bronze medalist(s)
Chen Szu-yu; Cheng I-ching; Peng Yu-han; Yeh Yi-tian; Wu Ying-syuan	Women's	Bangladesh; W 3–0	North Korea; L 1–3	2 Q	Macau; W 3–1	Japan; L 0–3	Did not advance		5

== Volleyball ==
Chinese Taipei has qualified both its men's and women's national teams for the indoor volleyball tournaments.

Summary

Team	Event	Group stage				Quarterfinal / 9th-14th classification	Semifinal / 9th-12th classification	Final / BM	
Team	Event	Opposition Score	Opposition Score	Opposition Score	Rank	Opposition Score	Opposition Score	Opposition Score	Rank
Chinese Taipei men's	Men's tournament	China; L 2–3	South Korea; L 1–3	Philippines; W 3–1	3	Kyrgyzstan; W 3–0	Kazakhstan; W 3–1	Ninth place match Vietnam; W 3–1	9
Chinese Taipei women's	Women's tournament	Kyrgyzstan; W 3–0	Mongolia; W 3–0	Thailand; L 0–3	2 Q	Japan; L 0–3	Kazakhstan; W 3–2	Indonesia; W 3–0	5

=== Men's tournament ===
Team roster

- Wen Yi-kai
- Jhang Yun-liang
- Wang Ping-hsun
- Chen Jie-ting
- Liu Yu-lin
- Tsai Pei-chang
- Huang Jheng-liang
- Lu Chiang Yao-kai
- Huang Yu-chen
- Chang Yu-chen
- Chuang Shao-chieh
- Chang Yu-sheng

Group play

Pos	Team	Pld	W	L	Pts	SW	SL	SR	SPW	SPL	SPR	Qualification
1	China	3	3	0	7	9	4	2.250	298	276	1.080	Quarterfinals
2	South Korea	3	2	1	7	8	4	2.000	284	249	1.141	Quarterfinals
3	Chinese Taipei	3	1	2	4	6	7	0.857	279	299	0.933	Classification 9th–16th
4	Philippines	3	0	3	0	1	9	0.111	215	252	0.853	Classification 9th–16th

Source: asiangames2026.org
Rules for classification: Tiebreakers

=== Women's tournament ===
Team roster

- Hsu Heng-yun
- Xu Zhen-xuan
- Hung Chia-yao
- Lin Shu-ho
- Kan Ko-hui
- Hsu Wan-yun
- Tsai Yu-chun
- Liao Yi-jen
- Chen Chieh
- Wen Yi-chin
- Wu Tzu-hua
- Chang Yi-chi

Group play

Pos	Team	Pld	W	L	Pts	SW	SL	SR	SPW	SPL	SPR	Qualification
1	Thailand	3	3	0	9	9	0	MAX	225	139	1.619	Quarterfinals
2	Chinese Taipei	3	2	1	6	6	3	2.000	214	157	1.363	Quarterfinals
3	Mongolia	3	1	2	3	3	6	0.500	167	198	0.843	Classification 9th–12th
4	Kyrgyzstan	3	0	3	0	0	9	0.000	113	225	0.502	Classification 9th–14th

Source: asiangames2026.org
Rules for classification: Tiebreakers

== Wushu ==
=== Taolu ===
Men

Athlete	Event	Event 1		Event 2		Total	Rank
Athlete	Event	Result	Rank	Result	Rank	Total	Rank
Cheng Yu-hsuan	Changquan	8.793	21	—N/a		8.793	21
Lee Po-feng	Daoshu & gunshu	9.516	7	9.263	9	18.779	9
Huang Wen-sheng	Nanquan & nangun	9.703	7	9.726	3	19.429	4
Liu Chang-min	Nanquan & nangun	9.720	5	9.710	5	19.430	3rd place, bronze medalist(s)
Sun Chia-hung	Taijiquan & taijijian	9.733	2	9.720	4	19.453	2nd place, silver medalist(s)

Women

Athlete	Event	Event 1		Event 2		Total	Rank
Athlete	Event	Result	Rank	Result	Rank	Total	Rank
Chao Tang-hsuan	Nanquan & nandao	9.700	5	9.646	7	19.346	6
Liu Pei-hsun	Taijiquan & taijijian	9.686	10	9.686	8	19.372	8

=== Sanda ===
Athlete	Event	Round of 16	Quarter-finals	Semi-finals	Final	
Athlete	Event	Opposition Score	Opposition Score	Opposition Score	Opposition Score	Rank
Zhang Huan-yi	Men's –75 kg	Jumamyradov (TKM); W 2–0	Mirzodalerkhon (TJK); W 2–0	Abdurashid (KAZ); L WKO	Did not advance	3rd place, bronze medalist(s)
Chen Si-yun	Women's –52 kg	Chan TC (HKG); L 0–2	Did not advance			
Lin Tsai-mei	Women's –60 kg	Bye	Zhang (CHN); L PD	Did not advance		
