= Sri Lanka at the 2026 Asian Games =

- Flag of Sri Lanka
- IOC code: SRI
- NOC: National Olympic Committee of Sri Lanka
- Website: olympic.lk

in Aichi and Nagoya, Japan 19 September 2026 – 4 October 2026
- Competitors: 156 in 25 sports
- Flag bearers (opening): Isiwaruna De Silva & Nuyara Fernando
- Flag bearer (closing): Nethmi Ahinsa
- Medals Ranked 28th: Gold 1 Silver 1 Bronze 1 Total 3

Asian Games appearances (overview)
- 1951; 1954; 1958; 1962; 1966; 1970; 1974; 1978; 1982; 1986; 1990; 1994; 1998; 2002; 2006; 2010; 2014; 2018; 2022; 2026

Sri Lanka competed at the 2026 Asian Games in Aichi and Nagoya, Japan. This marked Sri Lanka's 20th participation at the games, after making its debut at the inaugural edition in 1951.

The Sri Lankan team consisted of 156 athletes. The 156 consisted of 100 men and 56 women, along with 82 team officials. The 156 athlete delegation was the largest the country had ever sent to an edition of the Asian Games.

Modern pentathlete Isiwaruna De Silva and artistic gymnast Nuyara Fernando were the country's opening ceremony flagbearers.

== Competitors ==
The following is the list of number of competitors participating at the Games per sport/discipline.

Sport	Men	Women	Total
3x3 basketball	4	4	8
Archery	0	2	2
Athletics	17	7	24
Badminton	2	1	3
Beach volleyball	2	2	4
Boxing	4	3	7
Cricket	15	15	30
Diving	1	0	1
Field hockey	18	0	18
Golf	3	0	3
Gymnastics	1	1	2
Judo	4	0	4
Kabaddi	0	12	12
Karate	1	0	1
Modern pentathlon	1	1	2
Rowing	2	0	2
Rugby sevens	13	0	13
Sailing	1	1	2
Squash	2	1	3
Surfing	1	0	1
Swimming	1	1	2
Table tennis	1	1	2
Taewondo	0	1	1
Weightlifting	2	1	3
Wrestling	3	2	5
Wushu	1	0	1
Total	100	56	156

== 3x3 basketball ==
Sri Lanka qualified a men's and women's 3x3 basketball teams.

Summary

Team	Event	Group stage				Play-ins	Quarterfinal	Semifinal	Final / BM / CM	
Team	Event	Opposition Score	Opposition Score	Opposition Score	Rank	Opposition Score	Opposition Score	Opposition Score	Opposition Score	Rank
Sri Lanka men	Men's tournament	Kazakhstan; L 15–17	Philippines; L 12–21	Mongolia; L 11–21	4th	Did not advance				14
Sri Lanka women	Women's tournament	Qatar; W 19–16	Kazakhstan; L 8–21	China; L 2–21	3rd	Thailand; L 9–21	Did not advance			12

=== Men's tournament ===
Roster
The roster consisted of four athletes.

- Anthony Darren Bernard
- Sanjaan Gunerathne
- Methika Jayasinghe
- Isuru Weerakkodi

Group A

Pos	Team	Pld	W	L	PF	PA	PD	Pts	Qualification
1	Philippines	3	3	0	61	39	+22	6	Quarterfinals
2	Mongolia	3	2	1	46	38	+8	5	Play-ins
3	Kazakhstan	3	1	2	40	49	−9	4	Play-ins
4	Sri Lanka	3	0	3	38	59	−21	3	

Source: asiangames2026.org

21 September
13:15

Report

Kazakhstan	17–15	Sri Lanka
Pts: Junussov 7		Pts: Jayasinghe 7

Kinjō-futō Station Square, Nagoya
Referees: Danusorn Laosaksam (THA), Nie Cong (CHN)

21 September
14:55

Report

Philippines	21–12	Sri Lanka
Pts: Cabañero 8		Pts: Jayasinghe 6

Kinjō-futō Station Square, Nagoya
Referees: Chen Kuan I (TPE), Danusorn Laosaksam (THA)

23 September
12:50

Report

Mongolia	21–11	Sri Lanka
Pts: Ganzorgig 8		Pts: Jayasinghe 6

Kinjō-futō Station Square, Nagoya
Referees: Li Caiyan (CHN), Chen Kuan I (TPE)

=== Women's tournament ===
Roster
The roster consisted of four athletes.

- Shonali Dharmasena
- Pawani Manulya
- Senora Melani Perera
- Mindi Sakeesa

Group A

Pos	Team	Pld	W	L	PF	PA	PD	Pts	Qualification
1	China	3	3	0	60	17	+43	6	Quarterfinals
2	Kazakhstan	3	2	1	50	34	+16	5	Play-ins
3	Sri Lanka	3	1	2	29	58	−29	4	Play-ins
4	Qatar	3	0	3	27	57	−30	3	

Source: 2026 Asian Games

22 September
18:05

Report

Qatar	16–19	Sri Lanka
Pts: Gasir 8		Pts: Dharmasena 10

Kinjō-futō Station Square, Nagoya
Referees: Li Caiyan, (CHN)Liu Chee (MAS)

22 September
19:45

Report

Kazakhstan	21–8	Sri Lanka
Pts: Yuldasheva 9		Pts: Perera 6

Kinjō-futō Station Square, Nagoya
Referees: Li Caiyan (CHN), Kim Ga-in (KOR)

23 September
19:20

Report

China	21–2	Sri Lanka
Pts: Wang 8		Pts: Dharmasena 2

Kinjō-futō Station Square, Nagoya
Referees: Danusorn Laosaksam (THA), Rina Nozaki (JPN)

Play-ins

24 September
13:40

Report

Thailand	21–9	Sri Lanka
Pts: Naumkong 10		Pts: Perera 5

Kinjō-futō Station Square, Nagoya
Referees: Chen Kuan-i (TPE), Liu Chee (MAS)

== Archery ==
Sri Lanka entered two women's archers.

Women

Athlete	Event	Ranking round		Round of 48	Round of 32	Round of 16	Quarterfinals	Semifinals	Final / BM	
Athlete	Event	Score	Seed	Opposition Score	Opposition Score	Opposition Score	Opposition Score	Opposition Score	Opposition Score	Rank
Anuradha Karunaratne	Individual compound	632	51	Gonzales (PHI); L 136–141	Did not advance					
Rehana Tayabally	Individual compound	672	41	Al-saei (QAT); W 136–135	Asheghzadeh (IRN); L 140–146	Did not advance				

== Athletics ==
Sri Lanka entered 24 athletes (17 men and 7 women).

Men
Track events

Athlete	Event	Round one		Semifinal		Final	
Athlete	Event	Result	Rank	Result	Rank	Result	Rank
Kalhara Idupa	400 m	46.53	15	—N/a		Did not advance	
Kalinga Kumarage	400 m	45.74	8	—N/a		46.31	8
Harsha Karunarathna	800 m	1:49.99	11	—N/a		Did not advance	
Roshan Ranatunga	110 m hurdles	13.81	7	—N/a		Did not advance	
Ayomal Akalanka	400 m hurdles	49.78	3	—N/a		49.37	5
Chalith Piumal; Dineth Weeraratna; Merone Wijesinghe; Chamod Yodhasinghe	4 × 100 m relay	39.43	9	—N/a		39.55	7
Aruna Dharshana; Kalhara Idupa; Pasindu Kodikara; Kalinga Kumarage; Sadew Rajakaruna; Omel Shashintha Silva	4 × 400 m relay	DQ		—N/a		Did not advance	

Field events

Athlete	Event	Qualification		Final	
Athlete	Event	Distance	Rank	Distance	Rank
Gayan Sampath	Long jump	NM		—N/a	
Rumesh Tharanga	Javelin throw	Bye		88.55	1st place, gold medalist(s)
Sumedha Ranasinghe	Javelin throw	Bye		78.08	6

Women
Track events

Athlete	Event	Round one		Semifinal		Final	
Athlete	Event	Result	Rank	Result	Rank	Result	Rank
Takshima Kodithuwakku	800 m	2:08.06	11	Did not advance			
Lakshima Mendis; Nadeesha Ramanayaka; Araliya Sathsarani; Jithma Wijethunga	4 × 400 m relay	—N/a				3:34.90	7

Field events

Athlete	Event	Qualification		Final	
Athlete	Event	Distance	Rank	Distance	Rank
Madushani Herath	Long jump	—N/a		5.91	12
Madushani Herath	Triple jump	—N/a		13.20	8
Dilhani Lekamge	Javelin throw	—N/a		59.27	5

== Badminton ==
Sri Lanka entered three badminton players (two men and one woman).

Athlete	Event	Round of 64	Round of 32	Round of 16	Quarterfinal	Semifinal	Final / BM	
Athlete	Event	Opposition Result	Opposition Result	Opposition Result	Opposition Result	Opposition Result	Opposition Result	Rank
Dumindu Abeywickrama	Men's singles	Maharjan (NEP); W 2–0	Long (HKG); L 0–2	Did not advance				17
Viren Nettasinghe	Men's singles	Bye	Ahmed (MDV); W 2–0	Christie (INA); L 1–2	Did not advance			9
Ranithma Liyanage	Women's singles	Sherchan (NEP); W 2–0	An S-y (HKG); L 0–2	Did not advance				9

== Beach volleyball ==
Sri Lanka entered one men's and one women's pair.

Men

- Sandun Madusanka
- Dileepa Senarathna

Women

- Kasuni Lakshani
- Chathurika Weerasinghe

== Boxing ==
Sri Lanka entered seven boxers, four men and three women.

Athlete	Event	Round of 32	Round of 16	Quarterfinal	Semifinal	Final	
Athlete	Event	Opposition Result	Opposition Result	Opposition Result	Opposition Result	Opposition Result	Rank
Rukmal Prasanna	Men's 55 kg	Al Sarray (IRQ); L RSC	Did not advance				
Ravindu Jayanath	Men's 60 kg	Muhanov (TKM); W 3–2	Hamdam (AFG); L 1–4	Did not advance			
Lahiru Chandrabandara	Men's 70 kg	Saeed (YEM); W 4–1	Nishonov (KGZ); L RSC	Did not advance			
Yazmin Usaith	Men's 80 kg	—N/a	Nasredinov (CAM); W 4–1	Erkinboev (UZB); L RSC	Did not advance		
Nadeeka Pushpakumari	Women's 51 kg	Kargar (AFG); W 5–0	Yu (CHN); L 0–5	Did not advance			
Keshani Hansika	Women's 54 kg	Vo (VIE); L 0–5	Did not advance				
Sajeewani Cooray	Women's 60 kg	—N/a	Won (PRK); L RSC	Did not advance			

== Cricket ==
Sri Lanka qualified a men's and women's cricket teams. Both teams qualified as ICC Full Members.

Summary

Team	Event	Group Stage			Quarterfinal	Semifinal	Final / BM	
Team	Event	Opposition Score	Opposition Score	Rank	Opposition Score	Opposition Score	Opposition Score	Rank
Sri Lanka men's	Men's tournament	Bye			Nepal; W NR	India; L by 124 runs 45 (9.5) – 169/7 (20)	Bangladesh; W by 63 runs 165/9 (20) – 102 (17.3)	3rd place, bronze medalist(s)
Sri Lanka women's	Women's tournament	—N/a			Malaysia; W by 86 runs 160/4 (20) – 74/7 (20)	Pakistan; W by 8 wickets 178/2 (17.5) – 177/4 (20)	India; L by 163 runs 69 (15.4) – 216/3 (20)	2nd place, silver medalist(s)

=== Men's tournament ===
Roster
The roster consisted of 15 athletes.

- Sahan Arachchige
- Ashen Bandara
- Lasith Croospulle
- Keshan de Livera
- Niroshan Dickwella
- Binura Fernando
- Nuwanidu Fernando
- Dushan Hemantha
- Sineth Jayawardena
- Chamika Karunaratne
- Pramod Madushan
- Tharindu Rathnayake
- Wanuja Sahan
- Nuwan Thushara
- Vijayakanth Viyaskanth

Quarterfinals

Quarterfinal 3
29 September 2026
09:00
Scorecard

Nepal	v	Sri Lanka

Match abandoned
Kōrogi Sports Park, Nisshin
Umpires: Nitin Menon (Ind) and Gazi Sohel (Ban)

- No toss.
- No play was possible due to rain.
- Sri Lanka advanced by virtue of being the higher-seeded team.

Semifinals

Semifinal 2
1 October 2026
14:00
Scorecard

India; 169/7 (20 overs)	v	Sri Lanka; 45 (9.5 overs)
Ishan Kishan 80* (46); Sahan Arachchige 2/28 (4 overs)		Nuwanidu Fernando 15 (11); Abhishek Sharma 2/2 (0.5 over)

India won by 124 runs
Kōrogi Sports Park, Nisshin
Umpires: Faisal Afridi (Pak) and Gazi Sohel (Ban)

- Sri Lanka won the toss and elected to field.
- * This was Sri Lanka's lowest total in T20Is.

Bronze medal match

3 October 2026
09:00
Scorecard

Sri Lanka; 165/9 (20 overs)	v	Bangladesh; 102 (17.3 overs)
Tharindu Rathnayake 65 (32); Mahedi Hasan 2/19 (4 overs)		Nasum Ahmed 26 (28); Wanuja Sahan 2/17 (4 overs)

Sri Lanka won by 63 runs
Kōrogi Sports Park, Nisshin
Umpires: Faisal Afridi (Pak) and Nitin Menon (Ind)

- Sri Lanka won the toss and elected to bat.

=== Women's tournament ===
Roster
The roster consisted of 15 athletes. Nilakshika Silva and Vishmi Gunaratne were later replaced by Hansima Karunaratne and Anushka Sanjeewani.

- Chamari Athapaththu
- Mithali Ayodhya
- Kavisha Dilhari
- Imesha Dulani
- Hansima Karunaratne
- Kawya Kavindi
- Sanjana Kavindi
- Sugandika Kumari
- Nimasha Madushani
- Kaushini Nuthyangana
- Hasini Perera
- Chamudi Praboda
- Anushka Sanjeewani
- Harshitha Samarawickrama
- Rashmika Sewwandi

Quarterfinals

Quarter-final 3
18 September 2026
09:00
Scorecard

Sri Lanka; 160/4 (20 overs)	v	Malaysia; 74/7 (20 overs)
Chamari Athapaththu 63 (37); Nurin Imanina 3/29 (4 overs)		Winifred Duraisingam 28 (47); Chamari Athapaththu 2/3 (2 overs)

Sri Lanka won by 86 runs
Kōrogi Sports Park, Nisshin
Umpires: Gayathri Venugopalan (Ind) and Saleema Imtiaz (Pak)

- Sri Lanka won the toss and elected to bat.

Semifinals

Semi-final 1
20 September 2026
09:00
Scorecard

Pakistan; 177/4 (20 overs)	v	Sri Lanka; 178/2 (17.5 overs)
Ayesha Zafar 71 (40); Kawya Kavindi 1/13 (2 overs)		Chamari Athapaththu 83* (50); Fatima Sana 1/24 (3 overs)

Sri Lanka won by 8 wickets
Kōrogi Sports Park, Nisshin
Umpires: Shathira Jakir (Ban) and Shivani Mishra (Qat)

- Sri Lanka won the toss and elected to field.
- This was the highest successful run chase for Sri Lanka in WT20Is.

Gold medal match

22 September 2026
14:00
Scorecard

India; 216/3 (20 overs)	v	Sri Lanka; 69 (15.4 overs)
Smriti Mandhana 79 (45); Chamudi Praboda 1/34 (4 overs)		Chamari Athapaththu 29 (21); Deepti Sharma 3/6 (4 overs)

India won by 147 runs
Kōrogi Sports Park, Nisshin
Umpires: Saleema Imtiaz (Pak) and Shathira Jakir (Ban)

- India won the toss and elected to bat.
- India won the gold medal.

== Diving ==
Sri Lanka entered one male diver.

Men

Athlete	Events	Preliminary		Final	
Athlete	Events	Points	Rank	Points	Rank
Dulanjan Fernando	1 m springboard	—N/a		220.35	13
Dulanjan Fernando	3 m springboard	240.30	15	Did not advance	

== Field hockey ==
Sri Lanka qualified to the men's field hockey tournament after finishing second at the 2026 Asian Games Qualifier in Bangkok, Thailand.

Summary

Team	Event	Group Stage						Semifinal	PM	
Team	Event	Opposition Score	Opposition Score	Opposition Score	Opposition Score	Opposition Score	Rank	Opposition Score	Opposition Score	Rank
Sri Lanka men's	Men's tournament	Japan; L 0–9	India; L 1–16	Bangladesh; L 1–5	South Korea; L 0–5	Indonesia; W 4–3	5	Did not advance	Uzbekistan; W 4–2	9

=== Men's tournament ===
Roster
The roster consisted of 18 athletes.

- Tharindu Hendeniya
- Nilaksha Silva
- Nalantha De Silva
- Dammika Ranasingha
- Madushan Weerasuriya
- Suren Vimukthi
- Ravidu Nimanka
- Kusal Thilakasiri
- Madumal Gunarathna
- Bathiya De Alwis
- Madushan Bandara
- Pramudya Fernando
- Sandaruwan Sudusinghe
- Rajitha Kulathunga
- Anuradha Suresh
- Lakshan Sadaruwan
- Maleesha Madurawala
- Ross Fernando

Pool A

Pos	Team	Pld	W	D	L	GF	GA	GD	Pts	Qualification
1	India	5	5	0	0	49	4	+45	15	Semi-finals
2	South Korea	5	4	0	1	20	10	+10	12	Semi-finals
3	Japan (H)	5	3	0	2	29	7	+22	9	Fifth place classification
4	Bangladesh	5	2	0	3	9	23	−14	6	Fifth place classification
5	Sri Lanka	5	1	0	4	6	38	−32	3	Ninth place game
6	Indonesia	5	0	0	5	6	37	−31	0	Eleventh place game

Source: FIH
Rules for classification: 1) points; 2) matches won; 3) goal difference; 4) goals for; 5) head-to-head result; 6) field goals for.
(H) Hosts

Preliminary round

20 September 2026
17:00

Japan	9–0	Sri Lanka
Kimura 15'; Yamasaki 18', 29', 46', 58'; Fujishima 25'; Kawabe 48'; S. Tanaka 51'; Ooka 55'	Report

Gifu Prefectural Green Stadium
Umpires:
Mohammad Shahbaz Ali (BAN)
Haroon Rashid (PAK)

22 September 2026
19:00

India	16–1	Sri Lanka
Mandeep 5'; Jugraj 10', 22', 42', 53'; Abhishek 11', 17', 49'; Harmanpreet 16', 45'; Sukhjeet 29'; Dilpreet 30', 38', 55'; Manpreet 31'; Prasad 36'	Report	Rathnayake 50'

Gifu Prefectural Green Stadium
Umpires:
James Unkles (AUS)
Khalid Hussain (HKG)

24 September 2026
11:00

Bangladesh	5–1	Sri Lanka
Am. Islam 8', 27'; As. Islam 16', 54'; Hossain 43'	Report	Weerappuli 18'

Gifu Prefectural Green Stadium
Umpires:
Daulet Urmanov (KAZ)
Sean Rapaport (RSA)

26 September 2026
15:00

Sri Lanka	0–5	South Korea
		Park 29'; Son 50'; Lim Do. 54', 58'; Yang 55'

Gifu Prefectural Green Stadium
Umpires:
Mazin Al-Shukaili (OMA)
Deepak Joshi (IND)

28 September 2026
11:00

Sri Lanka	4–3	Indonesia
Ranasingha 11'; Batuvita 23'; Fernando 51'; Sudusinghe 58'	Report	Muhamad 20'; Prastyo 44', 50'

Gifu Prefectural Green Stadium
Umpires:
Hideki Kinoshita (JPN)
Zhou Fuyi (CHN)

Ninth place match

3 October 2026
09:00

Sri Lanka	4–2	Uzbekistan
Fernando 27'; Sudusinghe 27'; Bothale 49'; Rathnayake 55'	Report	Khakimov 13'; Sotlikov 33'

Gifu Prefectural Green Stadium
Umpires:
Mazin Al-Shukaili (OMA)
Haroon Rashid (PAK)

== Golf ==
Sri Lanka entered three male golfers.

Men

Athlete(s)	Event	Final						
Athlete(s)	Event	Round 1	Round 2	Round 3	Round 4	Total	To par	Rank
Dhanushan Kanas Kumar	Individual	80 (+10)	155 (+15)	Cut		155	+15	49
Thangaraja Nadaraja	Individual	73 (+3)	148 (+8)	Cut		148	+8	T41
Mithun Perera	Individual	74 (+4)	144 (+4)	224 (+14)	297 (+17)	297	+17	T37
Dhanushan Kanas Kumar; Thangaraja Nadaraja; Mithun Perera	Team	147 (+7)	292 (+12)	Cut		292	+12	15

== Gymnastics ==
Sri Lanka entered two gymnasts, one of each gender.

=== Artistic ===
Men

Athlete	Event	Qualification		Final	
Athlete	Event	Score	Rank	Score	Rank
Nadila Nethviru	Floor	10.000	33	—N/a	
Nadila Nethviru	Pommel horse	12.433	28	—N/a	

Women

Athlete	Event	Apparatus				Total	Rank
Athlete	Event	VT	UB	BB	FL	Total	Rank
Nuyara Fernando	All-around	12.000	7.933	9.433	9.800	39.166	27

== Judo ==
Sri Lanka entered four male judoka.

Men

Athlete	Event	Preliminaries	Round of 16	Quarterfinal	Semifinal	Repechage	Final / BM	
Athlete	Event	Opposition Result	Opposition Result	Opposition Result	Opposition Result	Opposition Result	Opposition Result	Rank
Wimukthi Premarathna	60 kg	Kanatbek (KGZ); L by Ippon in 2:3						
Daham Vipulaweera	66 kg		Kyrgyzbayev (KAZ); L by Ippon in 3:19					
Chamara Repiyallage	73 kg		Asadulloev (TJK); L by Yuko in 4:00					
Milan Marko	90 kg		Sherov (KGZ); L by Ippon in 0:25					

== Kabaddi ==
Sri Lanka entered a women's team.

Summary

Team	Event	Group Stage				Semifinal	Final	
Team	Event	Opposition Score	Opposition Score	Opposition Score	Rank	Opposition Score	Opposition Score	Rank
Sri Lanka women's	Women's tournament	Thailand; L 28–40	Chinese Taipei; L 17–63	Nepal; L 25–34	4th	Did not advance		7

=== Women's tournament ===
Roster
The roster consisted of 12 athletes.

- Shanika Bandara
- Hansika Bandara
- Kavindya Godamunne
- Anushika Gunarathne
- Nadeeka Gunasekara
- Madurika Hansamali
- Upeksha Jayaweera
- P. Madushani
- Rasathurai Priyavarna
- Kajenthini Rasa
- Navodya Sherangi
- Diluxshana Vimalenthiran

== Karate ==
Sri Lanka entered one male karateka.

Kata

Athlete	Event	Round of 32	Round of 16	Quarterfinals	Semifinals	Final	Rank
Athlete	Event	Opposition Result	Opposition Result	Opposition Result	Opposition Result	Opposition Result	Rank
Edward Biron	Men's kata	—N/a	Kakeru (JPN); L 0–5	Did not advance			7

== Modern pentathlon ==
Sri Lanka qualified two modern pentathletes (one of each gender). This marked the country's Asian Games debut in the sport.

Athlete	Event	Fencing seeding round (Épée one touch)		Semifinal								Final								
Athlete	Event	Fencing seeding round (Épée one touch)		FDE	Obstacle course		Swimming (100 m freestyle)		Shooting / Running (10 m laser pistol / 3000 m cross-country)		Total	FBR	Obstacle course		Swimming		Shooting / Running		Total	
Athlete	Event	V – D	Seed	R	Time	MP points	Time	MP points	Time	MP Points	MP points	R	Time	MP points	Time	MP points	Time	MP Points	Pts	Rank
Isiwaruna De Silva	Men's individual	8–27	32	206	0:50.06	295	1:04.45	278	11:54.62	513	1292	Did not advance								
Gayani Kumari	Women's individual	6–26	33	204	1:01.61	261	1:21.32	194	13:47.10	354	1013	Did not advance								

== Rowing ==
Sri Lanka entered two male rowers.

Men

Athletes	Event	Heats		Repechage		Semifinals		Final	
Athletes	Event	Time	Rank	Time	Rank	Time	Rank	Time	Rank
Mohamed Nafiran	Single sculls								
Mohamed Nafiran; Nuwan Sampath	Double sculls	6:48.17	5	6:44.57	9				

== Rugby sevens ==
Sri Lanka entered a men's team.

Summary

Team	Event	Group Stage				Quarterfinal	Pl.	Pl.	
Team	Event	Opposition Score	Opposition Score	Opposition Score	Rank	Opposition Score	Opposition Score	Opposition Score	Rank
Sri Lanka men's	Men's tournament	Philippines; W 22–14	Singapore; W 33–17	United Arab Emirates; W 17–5	1st	China; L 12–19	Philippines; L 12–33	United Arab Emirates; W 40–5	7

=== Men's tournament ===
Roster
The roster consisted of 13 athletes.

- Sandeepa Soysa
- Naveen Vishwajith
- Diluksha Dange
- Sandaruwan Perera
- Dilshan Balage
- Chandimal Rajaratna
- Kavindu Perera
- Pasindu Thakshila
- Shaahid Zumri
- Sewmina Ekanayake
- Madusanka Singhe
- Ravindu Hettiarachchi
- Srinath Sooriyabandara

Group C

Pos	Team	Pld	W	D	L	PF	PA	PD	Pts	Qualification
1	Sri Lanka	3	3	0	0	72	36	+36	9	Quarter-finals
2	United Arab Emirates	3	1	1	1	55	39	+16	6	Quarter-finals
3	Philippines	3	1	1	1	62	51	+11	6	Quarter-finals
4	Singapore	3	0	0	3	34	97	−63	3	

First match(es) will be played: 1 October 2026. Source:

1 October 2026
11:05

Sri Lanka	22–14	Philippines
Try: Widanalage (2) 4' c, 10' m Balage 11' m Rankothgedara 14+' m Con: Rankothgedara (1/2); Ibrahim (0/2)	Report	Try: Coleman 6' c Fogerty 13' c Con: Stroem (2/2)

Paloma Mizuho Rugby Stadium
Referee: Ibuki Tetsuka (Japan)

1 October 2026
17:20

Sri Lanka	33–17	Singapore
Try: Ravisinghe (2) 7' c, 14' m Widanalage 9' c Wijesundara 14' c Lansakara 14+' c Con: Rankothgedara (2/3); Ibrahim (2/2)	Report	Try: Vine 2' m Muhammad H. 6' c Wong J. 13'; Con: Muhammad H. (0/1); Marah (1/1)

Paloma Mizuho Rugby Stadium
Referee: Craig Chan (Hong Kong)

2 October 2026
11:05

Sri Lanka	17–5	United Arab Emirates
Try: Widanalage 6' m Ibrahim 9' c Wijesundara 11' m Con: Rankothgedara (0/2); Ibrahim (1/1)	Report	Try: Khalifa 14' m Con: Pieterse (0/1)

Paloma Mizuho Rugby Stadium
Referee: Ibuki Tetsuka (Japan)

== Squash ==
Sri Lanka entered three squash athletes (two men and one woman).

Athlete	Event	Round of 64	Round of 32	Round of 16	Quarterfinals	Semifinals	Final	Rank
Athlete	Event	Opposition Score	Opposition Score	Opposition Score	Opposition Score	Opposition Score	Opposition Score	Rank
Ravindu Laksiri	Men's singles	Bye	Davaajav (MGL); W 3–0	Singh (IND); L 0–3	Did not advance			
Shamil Wakeel	Men's singles	Bye	Chotrani (IND); L 0–3	Did not advance				
Chanithma Sinaly	Women's singles	—N/a	Liu (CHN); W 3–2	Subramaniam (MAS); L 0–3	Did not advance			

== Surfing ==
Sri Lanka qualified one male surfer.

Men

Athlete	Event	Round 1		Round 2	Round 3	Quarterfinals	Semifinals	Final / BM	
Athlete	Event	Score	Rank	Opposition Result	Opposition Result	Opposition Result	Opposition Result	Opposition Result	Rank
Nuchitha Irundika	Shortboard	8.93	2 R2	Seohyun (PRK); L 7.34–11.50	Did not advance				

== Swimming ==
Sri Lanka entered two swimmers (one man and one woman).

Athlete	Event	Heat		Final	
Athlete	Event	Time	Rank	Time	Rank
Disandu Niriella	Men's 50 m freestyle	24.35 PB	36	Did not advance	
Disandu Niriella	Men's 100 m freestyle	52.02	27	Did not advance	
Minagi Rupesinghe	Women's 200 m freestyle	2:12.20	16	Did not advance	
Minagi Rupesinghe	Women's 100 m backstroke	1:06.53	21	Did not advance	
Minagi Rupesinghe	Women's 200 m backstroke	2:22.41	17	Did not advance	

== Table tennis ==
Sri Lanka entered two table tennis athletes, one per gender.

Singles

Athlete	Event	Round of 64	Round of 32	Round of 16	Quarterfinals	Semifinals	Final / BM	
Athlete	Event	Opposition Result	Opposition Result	Opposition Result	Opposition Result	Opposition Result	Opposition Result	Rank
Chanul Kulappuwawadu	Men's singles	Faraji (IRN); L 0–4	Did not advance					33
Bimandee Bandara	Women's singles	Aiazbekova (KGZ); W 4–1	Joo Cheonhui (KOR); L 0–4	Did not advance				17

Doubles

Athlete	Event	Round of 64	Round of 32	Round of 16	Quarterfinals	Semifinals	Final / BM	
Athlete	Event	Opposition Result	Opposition Result	Opposition Result	Opposition Result	Opposition Result	Opposition Result	Rank
Chanul Kulappuwawadu; Bimandee Bandara	Mixed doubles	Albulhussein/Maryam (QAT); W 3–1	Shah/Chitale (IND); L 0–3	Did not advance				17

== Taekwondo ==
Sri Lanka entered one female taekwondo athlete.

Athlete	Event	Round of 16	Quarterfinals	Semifinals	Repechage	Final
Athlete	Event	Opposition Result	Opposition Result	Opposition Result	Opposition Result	Rank
Annsofna Vinothkanna	Women's 57 kg	Chuling (CHN); L 0–2				

== Weightlifting ==
Sri Lanka entered three weightlifters (two men and one woman).

Athlete	Event	Snatch (kg)		Clean & Jerk (kg)		Total (kg)	Rank
Athlete	Event	Result	Rank	Result	Rank	Total (kg)	Rank
Supun Somathilaka	Men's 60 kg	106	8	No lift		DNF	
Sandu Jayawardena	Men's 65 kg	DNF					
Upamalika Gunahilaka	Women's 49 kg	70	7	91 NR	7	161	7

== Wrestling ==
Sri Lanka entered five wrestlers (three men and two women).

Freestyle

Athlete	Event	Qualification	Round of 16	Quarterfinal	Semifinal	Repechage 1	Repechage 2	BM	
Athlete	Event	Opposition Result	Opposition Result	Opposition Result	Opposition Result	Opposition Result	Opposition Result	Opposition Result	Rank
Divoshan Fernando	Men's 65 kg	Bye	Ebrahimzadeh (IRI); L 0–11	Did not advance					
Nipuni Pedige	Women's 50 kg	—N/a	Keunimjaeva (UZB); L 0–5	Did not advance					
Nethmi Ahinsa	Women's 57 kg	—N/a	Hong (CHN); L 0–6	Did not advance		Pei-Ying (TPE); W 5–2	—N/a	Raimova (KAZ); L 1–13	5

== Wushu ==
Sri Lanka entered one male Wushu athlete.

Taolu

Athlete	Event	Final	
Athlete	Event	Points	Rank
Kavish Bandara	Men's changquan	9.346	16

== See also ==
- Sri Lanka at the 2026 Asian Beach Games
- Sri Lanka at the 2026 Commonwealth Games
