= Haruka Yamamoto =

Japanese 3x3 basketball player

Mitsubishi Electric Koalas
- Position: Forward
- League: WJBL

Personal information
- Born: 8 March 2004 (age 22)
- Listed height: 177 cm (5 ft 10 in)
Medals
Representing Japan
Asian Games
Gold medal – first place	2026 Aichi-Nagoya	Women's 3x3

Haruka Yamamoto (Japanese: 山本 遥香, born 8 March 2004) is a Japanese 3x3 basketball player. She plays for the Mitsubishi Electric Koalas and represents Japan in international 3x3 basketball competitions.

Yamamoto won the gold medal with Japan in the women's 3x3 basketball tournament at the 2026 Asian Games in Aichi-Nagoya, Japan. Japan defeated the Philippines 21–11 in the final to win the title.

== Career ==
Yamamoto was born on 8 March 2004. She attended Ritsumeikan University and plays for the Mitsubishi Electric Koalas. She competes in both five-on-five basketball and 3x3 basketball.

In 2026, Yamamoto was selected for Japan's women's 3x3 basketball team at the 2026 Asian Games. She competed alongside Yuki Hirashita, Sakura Horiuchi and Fatoumanana Nishi.

At the 2026 Asian Games, Japan lost its opening two group matches before winning its remaining matches to reach the knockout stage. Japan defeated China in the quarter-finals and South Korea in the semi-finals to reach the gold-medal match against the Philippines. Japan won the final 21–11 to claim the women's 3x3 basketball gold medal. Yamamoto scored two points in the final.
