= Nanpō Freight Line =

Railway line in Nagoya, Japan

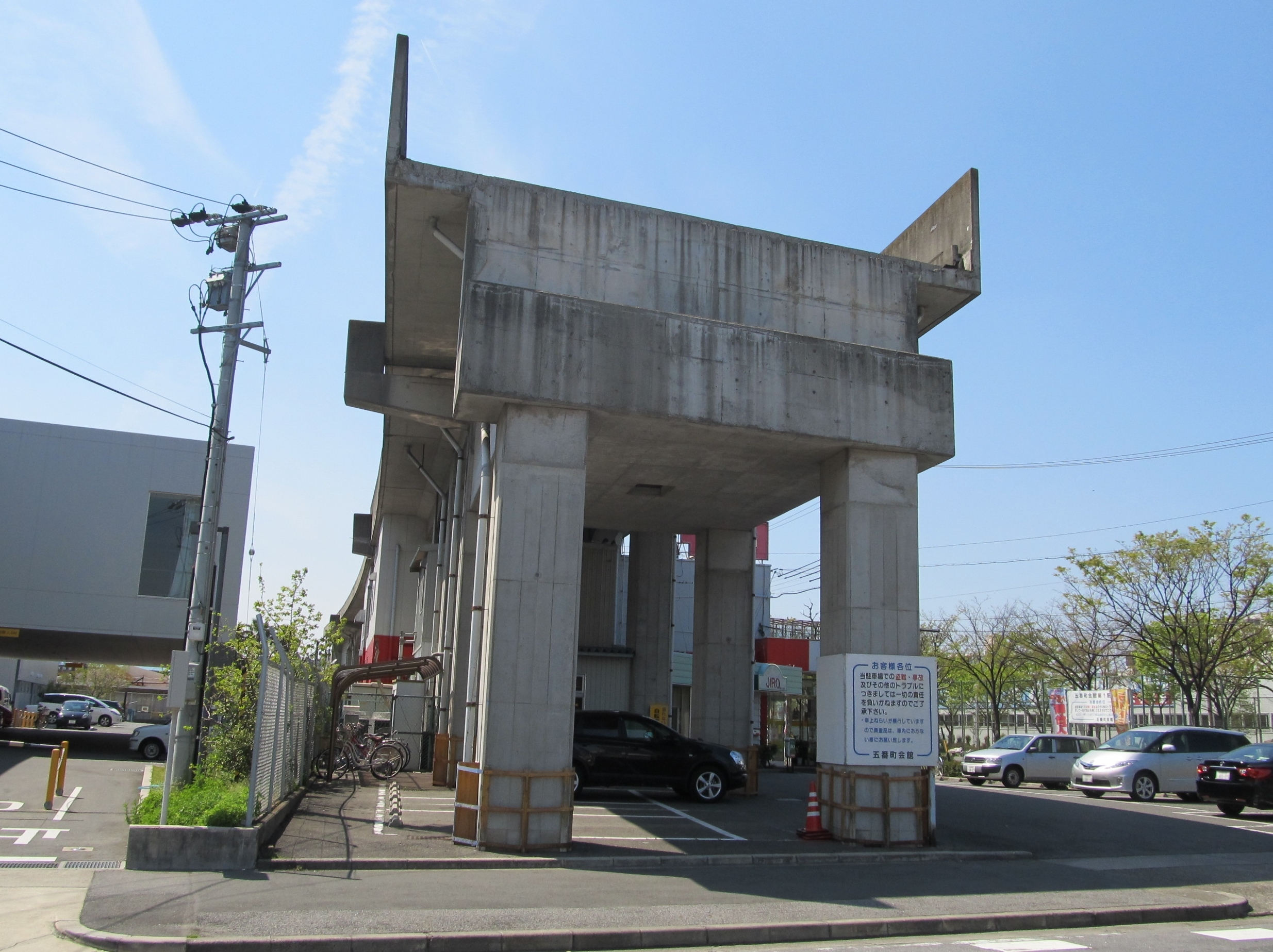
An abandoned viaduct of the Nanpō Freight Line in April 2012.

The Nanpō Freight Line (南方貨物線, Nanpō Kamotsu-sen) is a railway line in Nagoya Japan. Intended to increase capacity by connecting Nagoya Freight Terminal Station with Kasadera Station and Ōbu Station, work on it was suspended before completion. It was constructed not by the Japan Railway Construction Public Corporation, but by Japanese National Railways (JNR) itself.

== Line Data ==
- Length: 26 km (from Nagoya Freight Terminal Station to Ōbu Station)
- Electrification: complete, 1500 V DC
- Dual track: full line
- Triple track: from Nagoya Freight Terminal Station to crosspoint with Nagoya Minato Line

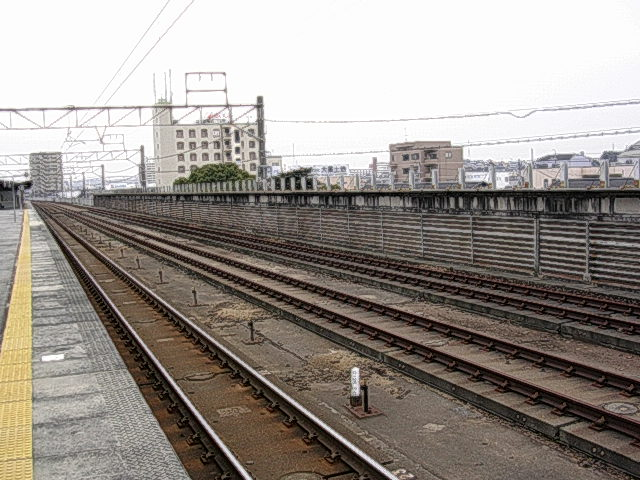
The two tracks on the right are remaining portions of the Nanpō Freight Line. Ōdaka Station, January 2007.

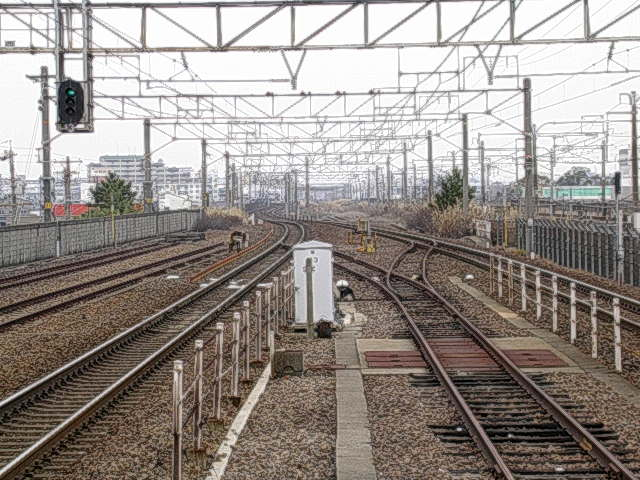
At Ōdaka Station, looking north. The Nanpō Freight Line separated from the Tōkaidō Main Line where the existing tracks veer to the left. January 2007.

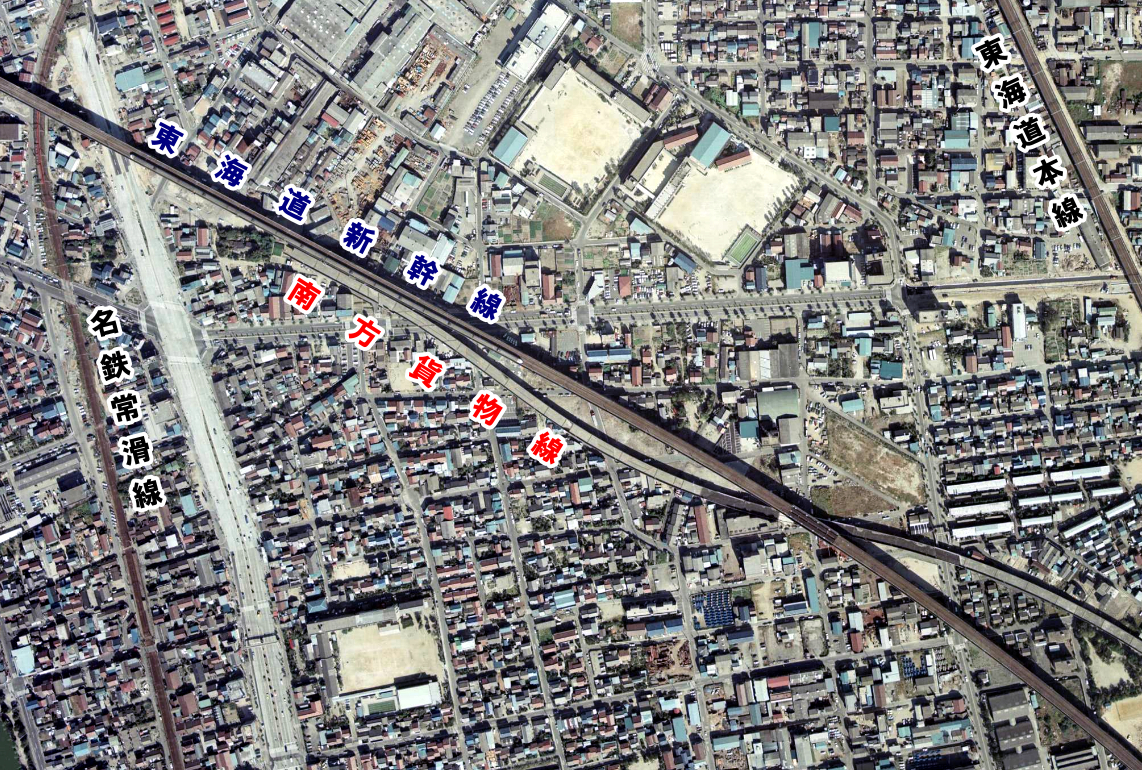
Aerial photograph of the Nanpō Freight Line crossing underneath the Tōkaidō Shinkansen with construction interrupted near the Meitetsu Tokoname Line at Minami-ku, Nagoya (October 1977).

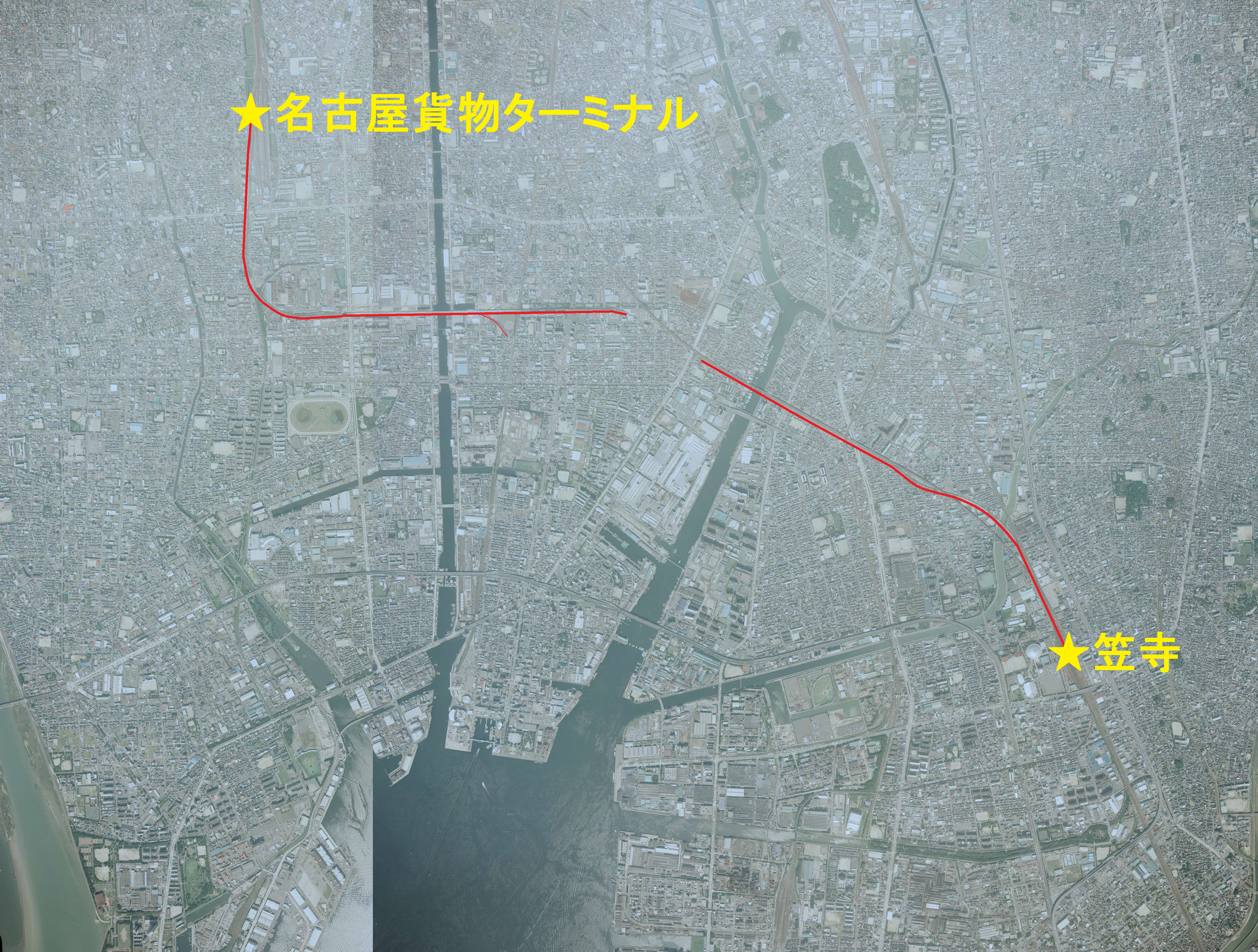
A composite satellite photograph of the Port of Nagoya area (photographed in 1995 and 2000) with the completed segments of the Nanpō Freight Line drawn as a red line.

== History ==
Between 1965 and 1975, JNR was transporting a large portion of the nation's freight. In the Nagoya area, slow freight trains were interfering with passenger service, and as a result, a plan was sought to provide a separated line to carry freight traffic. As Sasajima Station, the city's main freight terminal just south Nagoya Station, became too small, freight was to move south to a new site. The Nanpō Freight Line was built to bypass the busy Tōkaidō Main Line and serve these stations.

The original plan was to build a separate freight line bypassing the Tōkaidō Main Line from Inazawa Station's freight marshalling yard to Sasajima Station (which is actually a quadruple-tracked section of the Tōkaidō Main) and an extension to West Nagoyakō Station. The extension would be called the West Nagoyakō Line, and along its path would be constructed the Nagoya Freight Terminal Station. Diverging from that point and crossing the Nagoya Minato Line, then running parallel to the Tōkaidō Shinkansen, crossing the Meitetsu Tokoname Line, before rejoining the Tōkaidō Main Line just before Kasadera Station and continue to Ōbu Station in a quadruple track arrangement.

Work began in March 1967, and by 1975 the line was 90% complete. About 34.5 billion yen had been spent, but work on the line was suspended, and in 1979, as a part of reforms within JNR, the project was terminated. During the line's construction, JNR had lost a significant amount of freight business to trucks, and there was local opposition to the noise and vibration that the line would produce. With the opening of Nagoya Freight Terminal Station in 1980, eastbound freight first had to be moved to Inazawa switching yard to then proceed east on the Tōkaidō Main Line.

In 1992, as part of a study by the Ministry of Land, Infrastructure, Transport and Tourism about reducing congestion on the Tōkaidō Main Line, it was proposed that West Nagoyakō Line be converted to a passenger line, but due to minimal congestion at the time on the Tōkaidō, the proposal was dismissed.

Ultimately, the West Nagoyakō Line opened for passenger service in 2004 as the Aonami Line. During renovations, the point at which the Nanpō Freight Line diverged was demolished as it interfered with the work.

Since 2002, about 30 billion yen has been spent removing portions of the structure. Although the land has been put up for sale, only about 4 billion has been recovered due to low land prices.

Some of the line's upright supports and surface still stand on the grounds of the Chubu Steel Plate Company. From the Aonami Line, one can see that this section is used as an elevated parking lot. As of 2008, sections of the track which do not have offices or parking lots below are being removed. Sections of bridge near Ōdaka Station which are part of the same structure that supports the Tōkaidō Main Line are being reinforced to resist earthquakes. This work is being carried out by the Japan Railway Construction, Transport and Technology Agency.
