= 3x3 basketball at the 2026 Asian Games – Men's tournament =

Men's 3x3 basketball at the 2026 Asian Games
- Venues: Kinjō-futō Station Square
- Dates: 21–25 September 2026
- Competitors: 64 from 16 nations

Medalists
gold medal	South Korea
silver medal	Qatar
bronze medal	Iran

The men's 3x3 basketball tournament at the 2026 Asian Games will be held in Nagoya, Aichi Prefecture, Japan from 10 to 20 September 2026.

A temporary court near the Kinjō-futō Station of the Aonami Line will be set up.

The tournament is restricted to players aged 23 and under.

== Schedule ==
All times are local Japan Standard Time (UTC+9).

P	Preliminary round	Q	Quarterfinal qualifying	¼	Quarterfinals	½	Semifinals	F	Finals

21st Mon	22nd Tue	23rd Wed	24th Thu		25th Fri	
P	P	P	Q	¼	½	F

== Draw ==
The participating teams and matchups for the 3x3 basketball competition were announced on 28 July 2026.

Group A
Pos	Team
A1	Mongolia
A2	Philippines
A3	Kazakhstan
A4	Sri Lanka

Group B
Pos	Team
B1	China
B2	Iran
B3	Malaysia
B4	Hong Kong

Group C
Pos	Team
C1	Qatar
C2	Indonesia
C3	Chinese Taipei
C4	Bahrain

Group D
Pos	Team
D1	Japan
D2	Singapore
D3	South Korea
D4	Thailand

== Squads ==
Bahrain	China	Chinese Taipei	Hong Kong
Hamad Alamari; Elias Abdulla; Naser Alanzoor; Mohamed Qambar	Gao Jiayi; Han Shihao; Liu Qianhao; Ma Diancheng	Hsu Tang-chi; Yen Wei-chieh; Chang Chun-sheng; Tzou Tzu-hsi	Yang Bo Wen; Wu Wai Tsun; Chan Man To; Tang Lik Ka
Indonesia	Iran	Japan	Kazakhstan
Daffa Dhoifullah; Mohammed Aymane Garudi Arip; Erick Ibrahim Junior; Halmaheranno Aprianto Hady	Mohammadmahdi Rahimi; Mohammadbasir Momeni; Sarem Jafari; Seyedmohammad Ghafari	Roy Avan; Keito Tokumoto; Yuga Noda; Lei Baradarantahori	Timur Tangiyev; Alizhan Ydyryszhan; Mansur Seilkhanov; Artur Junussov
Malaysia	Mongolia	Philippines	Qatar
Te Yi Hang; Chong Zhen Yang; Pan Zheng Hao; Lim Ting Xuan	Baljinnyam Ganzorig; Binderiya Sandagdorj; Temuulen Chinges; Bolor-erdene Gantsolmon	Nic Cabañero; Luis Pablo; Andrei Dungo; Koji Buenaflor	Mubarak Jama; Mohammed Abbasher; Nazar Mahmoud; Hamad Mousa
Singapore	South Korea	Sri Lanka	Thailand
Ching Zhen Yu; Liam Blakney; Michael Kesevan-Kankam; Mohamed Zahid	Lee Ju-yeong; Ku Min-gyo; Lee Dong-geun; Kim Seung-woo	Anthony Bernard; Sanjaan Gunerathne; Methika Jayasinghe; Isuru Weerakkodi	Nicola Franco; Supakorn Saeming; Emmanuel Ejesu; Apisit Panpet

== Group phase ==
All times are local, Japan Standard Time (UTC+9).

=== Group A ===
Pos	Team	Pld	W	L	PF	PA	PD	Pts	Qualification
1	Philippines	3	3	0	61	39	+22	6	Quarterfinals
2	Mongolia	3	2	1	46	38	+8	5	Play-ins
3	Kazakhstan	3	1	2	40	49	−9	4	Play-ins
4	Sri Lanka	3	0	3	38	59	−21	3	

Source: asiangames2026.org

21 September
12:50

Report

Mongolia	12–19	Philippines
Pts: three players 4		Pts: Cabañero 7

Kinjō-futō Station Square, Nagoya
Referees: Su Yuyen (TPE), Danusorn Laosaksam (THA)

21 September
13:15

Report

Kazakhstan	17–15	Sri Lanka
Pts: Junussov 7		Pts: Jayasinghe 7

Kinjō-futō Station Square, Nagoya
Referees: Danusorn Laosaksam (THA), Nie Cong (CHN)

21 September
14:30

Report

Mongolia	13–8	Kazakhstan
Pts: Gantsolmon 6		Pts: Seilkhanov 5

Kinjō-futō Station Square, Nagoya
Referees: Rina Nozaki (JPN), Su Yeyen (TPE)

21 September
14:55

Report

Philippines	21–12	Sri Lanka
Pts: Cabañero 8		Pts: Jayasinghe 6

Kinjō-futō Station Square, Nagoya
Referees: Chen Kuan I (TPE), Danusorn Laosaksam (THA)

23 September
12:50

Report

Mongolia	21–11	Sri Lanka
Pts: Ganzorgig 8		Pts: Jayasinghe 6

Kinjō-futō Station Square, Nagoya
Referees: Li Caiyan (CHN), Chen Kuan I (TPE)

23 September
13:15

Report

Philippines	21–15	Kazakhstan
Pts: Cabañero 7		Pts: Tangiyev 6

Kinjō-futō Station Square, Nagoya
Referees: Kim Gain (KOR), Nie Cong (CHN)

=== Group B ===
Pos	Team	Pld	W	L	PF	PA	PD	Pts	Qualification
1	Iran	3	3	0	55	33	+22	6	Quarterfinals
2	China	3	2	1	58	43	+15	5	Play-ins
3	Malaysia	3	1	2	39	58	−19	4	Play-ins
4	Hong Kong	3	0	3	37	55	−18	3	

Source: asiangames2026.org

22 September
12:50

Report

China	15–18	Iran
Pts: Ma 9		Pts: Momeni 9

Kinjō-futō Station Square, Nagoya
Referees: Alexander Rulyov (KAZ), Neoh Yuen (MAS)

22 September
13:15

Report

Malaysia	18–15	Hong Kong
Pts: Te 8		Pts: Wu 9

Kinjō-futō Station Square, Nagoya
Referees: Su Yeyen (TPE), Alexandr Rulyov (KAZ)

22 September
14:30

Report

China	22–14	Malaysia
Pts: Liu 8		Pts: Chong 8

Kinjō-futō Station Square, Nagoya
Referees: Alexandr Rulyov (KAZ), Rina Nozaki (JPN)

22 September
14:55

Report

Iran	16–11	Hong Kong
Pts: Momeni, Rahimi 6		Pts: Chan 7

Kinjō-futō Station Square, Nagoya
Referees: Rina Nozaki (JPN), Neoh Yuen (MAS)

23 September
18:30

Report

China	21–11	Hong Kong
Pts: Liu 9		Pts: Chan, Yang 5

Kinjō-futō Station Square, Nagoya
Referees: Rina Nozaki (JPN), Danusorn Laosaksam (THA)

23 September
18:55

Report

Iran	21–7	Malaysia
Pts: Ghafari 8		Pts: Lim 3

Kinjō-futō Station Square, Nagoya
Referees: Su Yeyen (TPE), Alexandr Rulyov (KAZ)

=== Group C ===
Pos	Team	Pld	W	L	PF	PA	PD	Pts	Qualification
1	Qatar	3	3	0	49	37	+12	6	Quarterfinals
2	Chinese Taipei	3	2	1	58	37	+21	5	Play-ins
3	Indonesia	3	1	2	38	42	−4	4	Play-ins
4	Bahrain	3	0	3	27	56	−29	3	

Source: asiangames2026.org

21 September
18:30

Report

Qatar	10–7	Indonesia
Pts: Mousa 6		Pts: Junior 5

Kinjō-futō Station Square, Nagoya
Referees: Alexandr Rulyov (KAZ), Kim Gain (KOR)

21 September
18:55

Report

Chinese Taipei	21–2	Bahrain
Pts: Chang 9		Pts: Alanzoor 2

Kinjō-futō Station Square, Nagoya
Referees: Neoh Yuen (MAS), Liu Chee (MAS)

21 September
20:10

Report

Qatar	18–15	Chinese Taipei
Pts: Mousa 10		Pts: Chang 9

Kinjō-futō Station Square, Nagoya
Referees: Alexandr Rulyov (KAZ), Neoh Yuen (MAS)

21 September
20:35

Report

Indonesia	14–10	Bahrain
Pts: Junior 5		Pts: Alanzoor, Qambar 4

Kinjō-futō Station Square, Nagoya
Referees: Li Caiyan (CHN), Kim Gain (KOR)

23 September
14:30

Report

Qatar	21–15	Bahrain
Pts: Mousa 8		Pts: Alansari 6

Kinjō-futō Station Square, Nagoya
Referees: Li Caiyan (CHN), Kim Gain (KOR)

23 September
14:55

Report

Indonesia	17–22	Chinese Taipei
Pts: Dhoifullah 9		Pts: Hsu 10

Kinjō-futō Station Square, Nagoya
Referees: Neoh Yuen (MAS), Kim Gain (KOR)

=== Group D ===
Pos	Team	Pld	W	L	PF	PA	PD	Pts	Qualification
1	South Korea	3	3	0	61	37	+24	6	Quarterfinals
2	Japan	3	2	1	54	57	−3	5	Play-ins
3	Singapore	3	1	2	52	50	+2	4	Play-ins
4	Thailand	3	0	3	40	63	−23	3	

Source: asiangames2026.org

22 September
18:30

Report

Japan	21–17	Singapore
Pts: Tokumoto 7		Pts: Mohamed 6

Kinjō-futō Station Square, Nagoya
Referees: Kim Gain (KOR), Nie Cong (CHN)

22 September
18:55

Report

South Korea	21–11	Thailand
Pts: Kim 8		Pts: Panpet 4

Kinjō-futō Station Square, Nagoya
Referees: Liu Chee (MAS), Nie Cong (CHN)

22 September
20:10

Report

Singapore	21–10	Thailand
Pts: Ching 9		Pts: Ejesu 6

Kinjō-futō Station Square, Nagoya
Referees: Li Caiyan (CHN), Nie Cong (CHN)

22 September
20:35

Report

Japan	12–21	South Korea
Pts: Roy 7		Pts: Lee J. 9

Kinjō-futō Station Square, Nagoya
Referees: Nie Cong (CHN), Danusorn Laosaksam (THA)

23 September
20:10

Report

Singapore	14–19	South Korea
Pts: Ching 8		Pts: Lee D. 7

Kinjō-futō Station Square, Nagoya
Referees: Liu Chee (MAS), Danusorn Laosaksam (THA)

23 September
20:35

Report

Japan	21–19	Thailand
Pts: Roy 10		Pts: Ejesu 8

Kinjō-futō Station Square, Nagoya
Referees: Alexandr Rulyov (KAZ), Su Yeyen (TPE)

== Knockout round ==
All times are local, Japan Standard Time (UTC+9).

Play-ins
C2	Chinese Taipei	21
B3	Malaysia	14
B2	China	21
C3	Indonesia	10
A2	Mongolia	20
D3	Singapore	16
D2	Japan	18
A3	Kazakhstan	17

Quarter-finals
A1	Philippines	21
C2	Chinese Taipei	19
B2	China	13
D1	South Korea	22
C1	Qatar	18
A2	Mongolia	14
D2	Japan	3
B1	Iran	21

Semi-finals
A1	Philippines	9
D1	South Korea	21
C1	Qatar	14
B1	Iran	11

Gold medal game
D1	South Korea	19
C1	Qatar	10
Bronze medal game
A1	Philippines	10
B1	Iran	21

=== Play-ins ===
24 September
12:50

Report

Chinese Taipei	21–14	Malaysia
Pts: Yeh, Chang 7		Pts: Chong 6

Kinjō-futō Station Square, Nagoya
Referees: Rina Nozaki (JPN), Alexandr Rulyov (KAZ)

24 September
13:15

Report

China	21–10	Indonesia
Pts: Liu 12		Pts: Arip 4

Kinjō-futō Station Square, Nagoya
Referees: Alexandr Rulyov (KAZ), Neoh Yuen (MAS)

24 September
14:30

Report

Mongolia	20–16	Singapore
Pts: Chinges, Gantsolmon 6		Pts: Ching, Zahid 7

Kinjō-futō Station Square, Nagoya
Referees: Nie Cong (CHN), Su Yu-yen (TPE)

24 September
14:55

Report

Japan	18–17	Kazakhstan
Pts: Noda 7		Pts: Seilkhanov 7

Kinjō-futō Station Square, Nagoya
Referees: Su Yu-yen (TPE), Neoh Yuen (MAS)

=== Quarterfinals ===
24 September
18:30

Report

Philippines	21–19	Chinese Taipei
Pts: Cabañero 8		Pts: Yeh 10

Kinjō-futō Station Square, Nagoya
Referees: Kim Ga-in (KOR), Danusorn Laosaksam (THA)

24 September
18:55

Report

South Korea	22–13	China
Pts: Ku, Lee J.Y. 6		Pts: Liu 7

Kinjō-futō Station Square, Nagoya
Referees: Rina Nozaki (JPN), Alexandr Rulyov (KAZ)

24 September
20:10

Report

Qatar	18–14	Mongolia
Pts: Mousa 11		Pts: Gantsolmon 7

Kinjō-futō Station Square, Nagoya
Referees: Li Caiyan (CHN), Kim Ga-in (KOR)

24 September
20:35

Report

Iran	21–3	Japan
Pts: Momeni 8		Pts: 3 players 1

Kinjō-futō Station Square, Nagoya
Referees: Alexandr Rulyov (KAZ), Neoh Yuen (MAS)

=== Semifinals ===
25 September
13:50

Report

Philippines	9–21	South Korea
Pts: Pablo, Buenaflor 3		Pts: Kim 8

Kinjō-futō Station Square, Nagoya
Referees: Su Yu-yen (TPE), Neoh Yuen (MAS)

25 September
14:15

Qatar	14–11	Iran
Pts: Mousa 12		Pts: Momeni 4

Kinjō-futō Station Square, Nagoya
Referees: Nie Cong (CHN), Alexandr Rulyov (KAZ)

=== Bronze medal game ===
25 September
18:30

Report

Philippines	10–21	Iran
Pts: Cabañero 4		Pts: Momeni 12

Kinjō-futō Station Square, Nagoya
Referees: Kim Ga-in (KOR), Lui Chee (MAS)

=== Gold medal game ===
25 September
19:30

Report

South Korea	19–10	Qatar
Pts: Lee Ju-yeong 9		Pts: Mousa 4

Kinjō-futō Station Square, Nagoya
Referees: Su Yu-yen (TPE), Neoh Yuen (MAS)

== Final standing ==
Rank	Team	Pld	W	L
1st place, gold medalist(s)	South Korea	6	6	0
2nd place, silver medalist(s)	Qatar	6	5	1
3rd place, bronze medalist(s)	Iran	6	5	1
4	Philippines	6	4	2
5	Chinese Taipei	5	3	2
6	China	5	3	2
7	Mongolia	5	3	2
8	Japan	5	3	2
9	Singapore	4	1	3
10	Kazakhstan	4	1	3
11	Malaysia	4	1	3
12	Indonesia	4	1	3
13	Thailand	3	0	3
14	Sri Lanka	3	0	3
15	Hong Kong	3	0	3
16	Bahrain	3	0	3
