= Sakura Horiuchi =

Japanese 3x3 basketball player

Chanson Cosmetics V-Magic
- Position: Point guard
- League: WJBL

Personal information
- Born: 1 April 2006 Japan
- Listed height: 167 cm (5 ft 6 in)
Medals
Representing Japan
Asian Games
Gold medal – first place	2026 Aichi-Nagoya	Women's 3x3

Sakura Horiuchi (Japanese: 堀内 桜花, born 1 April 2006) is a Japanese 3x3 basketball and basketball player. She plays as a point guard for Chanson Cosmetics V-Magic and represents Japan in international 3x3 basketball competitions.

Horiuchi won the gold medal with Japan in the women's 3x3 basketball tournament at the 2026 Asian Games in Aichi-Nagoya. Japan defeated the Philippines 21–11 in the final, with Horiuchi scoring eight points.

== Career ==
Horiuchi was born on 1 April 2006. She attended Kyoto Seika Gakuen High School, where she played basketball before joining Chanson Cosmetics V-Magic.

In 2026, Horiuchi began competing in 3x3 basketball alongside her five-on-five career. She made her 3x3 debut at the Q.O.Q. 3x3 2026 tournament in Tokyo in June, playing for the Japan Basketball Association's U21 team. She subsequently represented Japan at the FIBA 3x3 U21 Nations League and was selected for the women's 3x3 team at the 2026 Asian Games.

At the 2026 Asian Games in Aichi-Nagoya, Horiuchi represented Japan in the women's 3x3 basketball tournament alongside Yuki Hirashita, Fatoumanana Nishi and Haruka Yamamoto. Japan defeated China in the quarter-finals and South Korea in the semi-finals before defeating the Philippines 21–11 in the final to win the gold medal. Horiuchi scored eight points in the final.
