= Amyah Espanol =

Filipino basketball player

No. 7 – FEU Tamaraws
- Position: Guard
- League: UAAP

Personal information
- Born: February 21, 2005 (age 21) Detroit, Michigan, U.S.
- Listed height: 5 ft 8 in (1.73 m)

Career information
- High school: Renaissance (Detroit)
- College: Davenport (2023–24); FEU (2024–present)
Medals
Representing the Philippines
Women's 3x3 basketball
Asian Games
Silver medal – second place	2026 Aichi–Nagoya	Team

Amyah Izabel Espanol (born May 21, 2005) is a Filipino basketball player who plays for the FEU Lady Tamaraws in the University Athletic Association of the Philippines (UAAP).

== Early life and education ==
Amyah Espanol was born on May 21, 2005 in Detroit in the United States. She studied at the Renaissance High School in Detroit before moving to the Davenport University in 2023 for her freshman year and pursued a degree in computer science. She moved to the Philippines in 2024 to study at the Far Eastern University in Manila.

== Career ==
=== College ===
Espanol played for the Davenport Panthers as a freshman student. She featured in 20 games for the collegiate women's basketball team.

Espanol received offers to play for the University of Santo Tomas and Far Eastern University in Manila, Philippines. She committed to play for the latter in 2024. Espanol served residency for Season 87 of the University Athletic Association of the Philippines (UAAP) which covered the 2024–25 academic year. Meanwhile she played for the FEU Lady Tamaraws in the WMPBL Invitational Tournament in early 2025. She eventually made her UAAP debut in Season 88 in late 2025.

=== 3x3 basketball ===
Espanol has been part of the under-23 squad of the Philippine women's national 3x3 team. She helped the Philippines qualify for the 2026 FIBA 3x3 U23 World Cup in China via the team's participation in the FIBA Nations League Asia SEA 3x3 U23.

However due to scheduling issues, Espanol was fielded with the Philippines U23 team which took part at the 2026 Asian Games in Aichi and Nagoya, Japan instead. The team finished as silver medalists, losing to Japan in the final of the women's 3x3 tournament.
