= Kacey dela Rosa =

Filipino basketball player

Kacey Dela Rosa
No. 28 – Ateneo Blue Eagles
- Position: Center
- League: UAAP

Personal information
- Born: March 1, 2004 (age 22)
- Listed height: 6 ft 0 in (1.83 m)

Career information
- College: Ateneo

Career highlights
- 2× UAAP Most Valuable Player (2023, 2024)
Medals
Representing the Philippines
Women's basketball
SEA Games
Gold medal – first place	2025 Bangkok	Team
Women's 3x3 basketball
Asian Games
Silver medal – second place	2026 Aichi–Nagoya	Team
Asia Cup
Silver medal – second place	2026 Singapore	Team

Quinn Kacey Dela Rosa (born March 1, 2004) is a Filipina basketball player the Ateneo Blue Eagles at the University Athletic Association of the Philippines. She also represents the Philippine national team.

== Early life and education ==
Quinn Kacey Dela Rosa was born on March 1, 2004. She initially took up volleyball when studied at the Holy Child Catholic School in Tondo, Manila.She took up basketball at age nine, playing with boys near their residence.

Dela Rosa was scouted by a public school coach who encourage her to try out for Chiang Kai-shek College where she finished her high school studies. For her collegiate studies she entered the Ateneo de Manila University.

== Career ==
=== College ===
Dela Rosa plays for the Ateneo Blue Eagles at the University Athletic Association of the Philippines (UAAP) under coach LA Mumar. She debuted at the women's basketball championship in UAAP Season 85, where she was named Rookie of the Year.

Dela Rosa was named Most Valuable Player for Seasons 86 and 87. Through her recognition in Season 86, she became the first Ateneo women's basketball MVP since Season 70 of 2007. she was also named Collegiate Press Corps Women’s Basketball Player of the Year in Season 87. Season 88 will be her final year.

Dela Rosa is also part of Ateneo's 3x3 team. Her school won the women's 3x3 title in Season 87.

=== National team ===
Dela Rosa has played for the Philippine national team debuting at the 2023 William Jones Cup, an invitational tournament in Taiwan. In 2025, she played for the Philippines at the 2025 FIBA Women's Asia Cup Division A tournament, finishing sixth. Later she helped the team win a gold medal at the 2025 SEA Games in Thailand.

She is also a Philippine national 3x3 team helping the team qualify for the 2025 FIBA 3x3 U23 World Cup via the FIBA 3×3 Nations League.

Dela Rosa was part of the 3x3 team which played in the 2026 Asian Games in Japan. She incurred an apparent ankle injury in the opening game against Mongolia. The team went on to win a silver medal with coach Anton Altamirano confirming that she played through an injury.
