= Yuki Hirashita =

Japanese 3x3 basketball player

Toyota Boshoku Sunshine Rabbits
- Position: Point guard
- League: WJBL

Personal information
- Born: 14 May 2003 (age 23) Aichi Prefecture, Japan
- Listed height: 175 cm (5 ft 9 in)

Yuki Hirashita (Japanese: 平下 結貴, born 14 May 2003) is a Japanese 3x3 basketball and basketball player who plays as a point guard. She plays for the Toyota Boshoku Sunshine Rabbits in the WJBL and represents Japan in international 3x3 basketball competitions.

Hirashita won the gold medal with Japan in the women's 3x3 basketball tournament at the 2026 Asian Games in Aichi-Nagoya, Japan. She scored nine points in Japan's 21–11 victory over the Philippines in the final, including the decisive two-point basket that secured the gold medal.

== Early life and career ==
Hirashita was born on 14 May 2003 in Aichi Prefecture. She played youth basketball with Nagakute Mini and Polaris before attending Ohka Gakuen High School in Aichi Prefecture. She subsequently joined the Toyota Boshoku Sunshine Rabbits.

Hirashita plays as a point guard and has competed in the WJBL for Toyota Boshoku. She was also selected to represent Japan in 3x3 basketball at the 2026 Asian Games following the withdrawal of Yuka Yagi because of injury.

== 2026 Asian Games ==
At the 2026 Asian Games, Hirashita competed for Japan in the women's 3x3 basketball tournament alongside Fatoumanana Nishi, Haruka Yamamoto and Sakura Horiuchi. Japan lost its first two group matches but advanced to the knockout stage after winning its remaining group matches.

Japan defeated China in the quarter-finals and South Korea in the semi-finals to reach the final against the Philippines. In the final, Japan won 21–11, with Hirashita leading Japan with nine points. Her two-point basket late in the game secured Japan's first Asian Games gold medal in women's 3x3 basketball.
