= Fatoumanana Nishi =

Japanese basketball player (born 2003)

Fatoumanana Nishi 西 ファトゥマ七南
No. 3 – Toyota Boshoku Sunshine Rabbits
- League: W League

Personal information
- Born: October 6, 2003 (age 23) Chiba Prefecture, Japan
- Listed height: 1.75 m (5 ft 9 in)

Career information
- High school: Showa Gakuen
- College: Waseda
- Playing career: 2026–present

Career history
- 2026–: Toyota Boshoku Sunshine Rabbits
Medals
Representing the Japan
Women's 3x3 basketball
Asian Games
Gold medal – first place	2026 Aichi–Nagoya	Team
FIBA 3x3 Asia Cup
Silver medal – second place	2025 Singapore	Team

Fatoumanana Nishi (西 ファトゥマ七南, Nishi Fatōmanana) is a Japanese basketball player who plays for the Toyota Boshoku Sunshine Rabbits. She is also a 3x3 player.

== Early life and education ==
Fatoumanana Nishi was born in the Chiba Prefecture on October 6, 2003. She took up basketball when she was in fourth grade in elementary after being convinced by her basketball club teacher. She attended the Showa Gakuen High School in Chiba before entering Waseda University to pursue a degree in sports science.

== Career ==
=== High school and university ===
Nishi played for the women's basketball team of Showa Gakuen High School. She was made captain in her third year in 2021 by her coach to help develop her maturity. She also played for Waseda University and became vice captain by her final year in 2025.

=== Toyota Boshoku Sunshine Rabbits ===
In December 2025, Nishi joined the Toyota Boshoku Sunshine Rabbits of the W League.

=== 3x3 basketball ===
==== Club ====
Nishi was part of Zoos Tokyo which won the Manila Hustle 3x3, a FIBA 3x3 Women's Series qualifier, in February 2025.

==== National team ====
Nishi was selected to play for Japan in the 2025 FIBA 3x3 Asia Cup. The team finished as silver medalists, losing to Australia in the final.

Nishi with Momoka Hanashima and Misora Iha, have represented Japan in the Nations League winning three consecutive overall titles. In the U21 tournament in 2024, and in the U23 tournament in 2025 and 2026.

She was part of the Japan U23 team which played at the 3x3 women's tournament of the 2026 Asian Games in Aichi and Nagoya. They won a gold medal, defeating the Philippines in the final.
