= Aonami Line =

Railway line in Nagoya, Japan

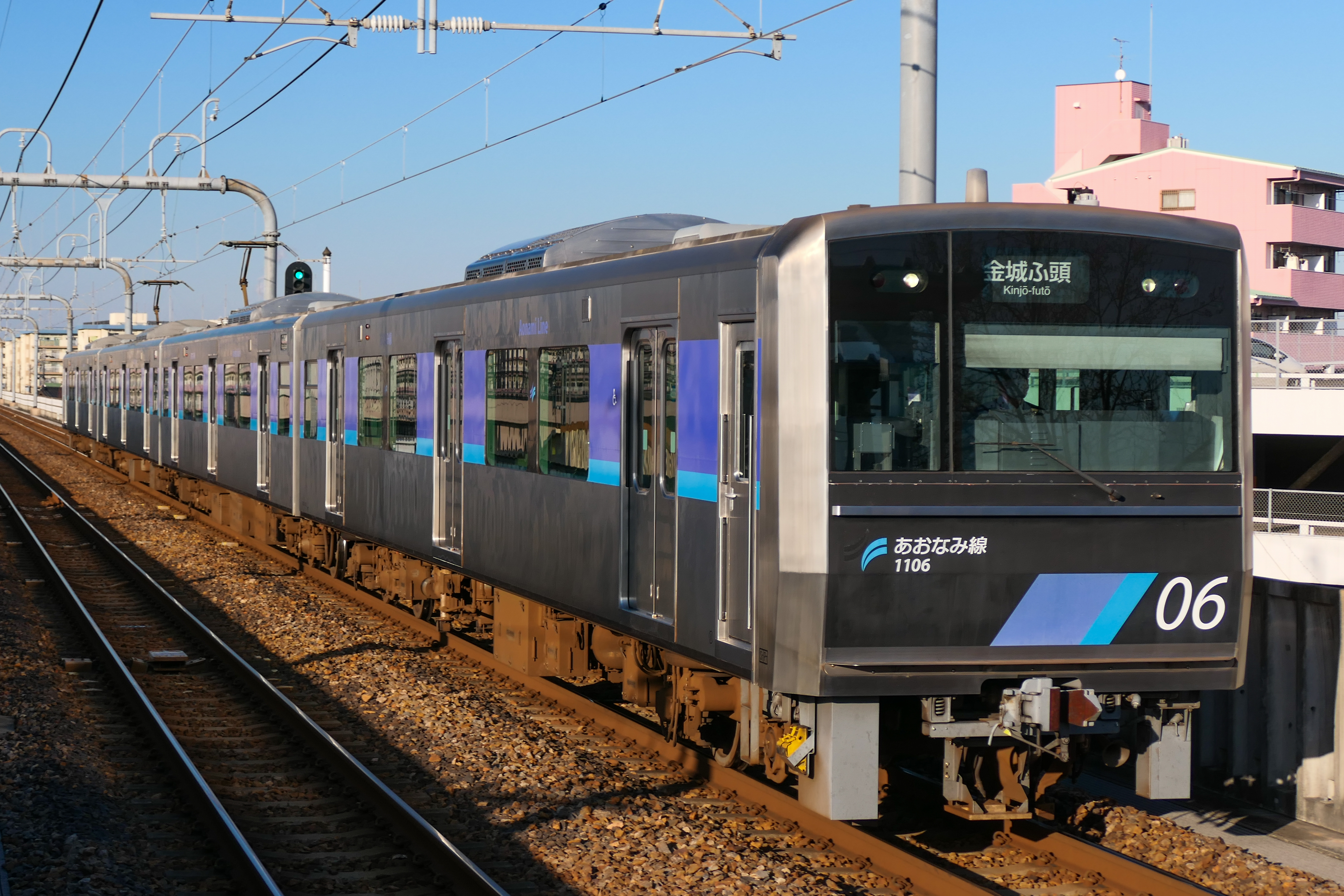
- A 1000 series EMU

Overview
- Native name: あおなみ線
- Owner: Nagoya Rinkai Rapid Transit
- Locale: Nagoya
- Termini: Nagoya; Kinjō-futō
- Stations: 11

Service
- Type: Commuter rail
- Depot(s): Shionagi (between Inaei and Noseki Stations)
- Rolling stock: 1000 series
- Daily ridership: 43,888 (2018)

History
- Opened: 1 June 1950; 76 years ago as Nishi-Nagoyakō Line; 6 October 2004 (as Aonami Line)

Technical
- Line length: 15.2 km (9.4 mi)
- Track gauge: 1,067 mm (3 ft 6 in)
- Minimum radius: 191 m
- Electrification: 1,500 V DC, overhead catenary
- Operating speed: 110 km/h (70 mph)

The Aonami Line (あおなみ線, Aonami-sen) is a third-sector commuter railway line in the city of Nagoya operated by the Nagoya Rinkai Rapid Transit (名古屋臨海高速鉄道, Nagoya Rinkai Kōsoku Tetsudō). Officially called the Nishi-Nagoyakō Line (西名古屋港線, Nishi-Nagoyakō-sen; West Nagoya Port Line), it connects Nagoya Station with Kinjō-futō Station.

The line was formerly a freight branch line of Tokaido Main Line, converted for passenger usage in October 2004. It is still operated as a freight line by Japan Freight Railway Company between Nagoya and Nagoya Freight Terminal; thus, the section between Nagoya and Arako Station is used for both passenger and freight traffic. Since its opening in 2017, the Aonami Line is used as the main rapid transit access to Legoland Japan Resort and SCMaglev and Railway Park, both located nearby the terminus.

The line's name is a combination of the company's color ao ("blue"), na for Nagoya, and mi for Minato ward. As two words, ao nami can also be read as "blue waves."

== History ==
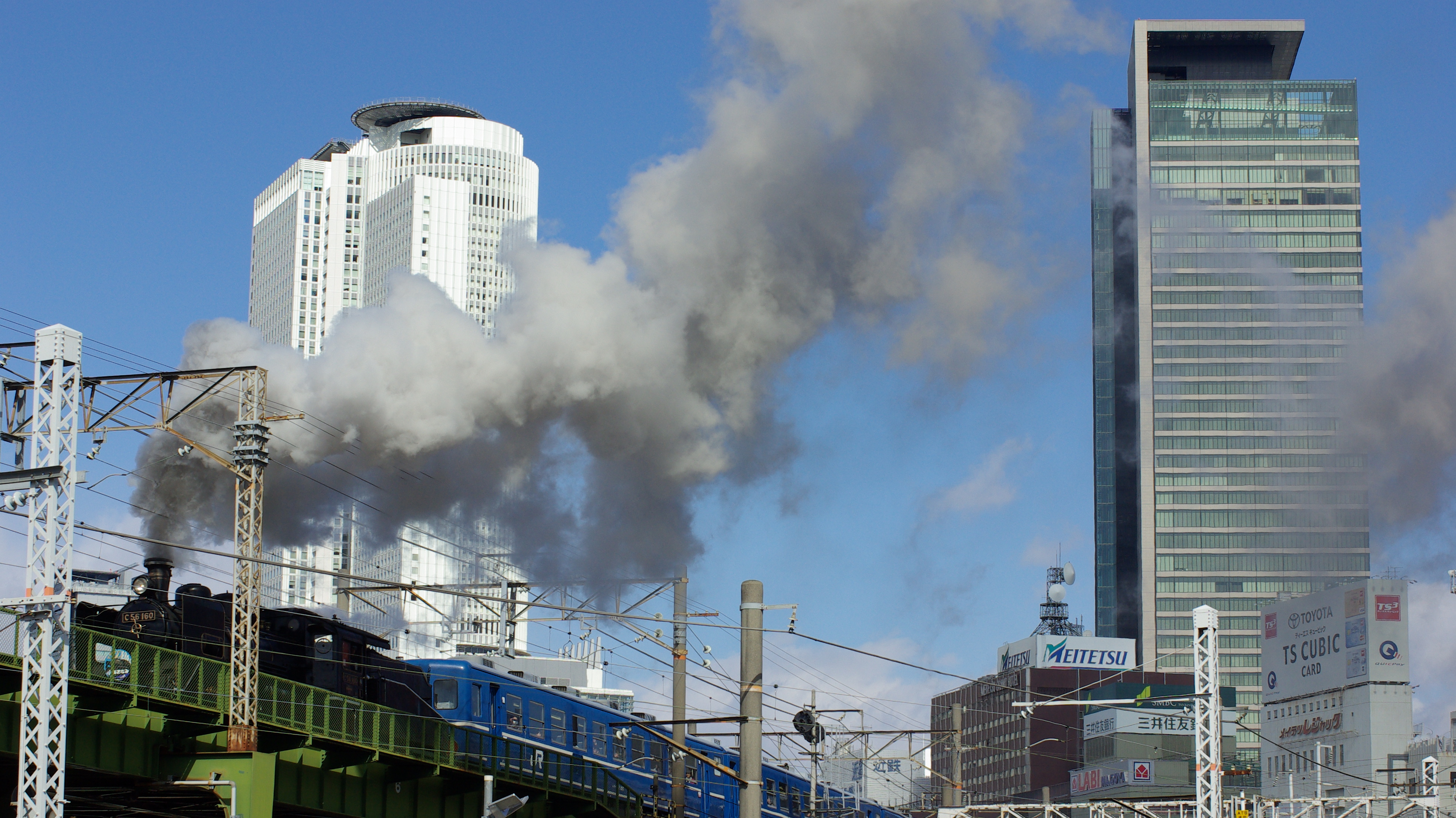
A JNR Class C56 locomotive hauling 12 series coaches on the Aonami Line, February 2013

The Nishi-Nagoyakō Line opened on 1 June 1950 as a freight branch of the Tokaido Main Line between Sasashima Freight Terminal (笹島貨物) and Nishi-Nagoyakō (西名古屋港) operated by Japanese National Railways (JNR). Nagoya Freight Terminal opened on 1 October 1980 as part of the initial construction of the Nanpō Freight Line, and with the closure of Sasashima Freight Terminal on 1 November 1986, Nagoya Freight Terminal became the starting point of the line. With the privatization and division of JNR on 1 April 1987, the line was transferred to Central Japan Railway Company (JR Central) as a "Class 1 railway operator" and JR Freight as a "Class 2 railway operator".

Plans to operate passenger services on the line were formalized in the 1990s, and Nagoya Rinkai Rapid Transit company was established in 1997 as a third-sector company funded by the city of Nagoya. The passenger Aonami Line utilized approximately 12 km of existing freight line with a newly constructed approximately 4 km extension to Kinjō-futō Station. Construction started in 2000, with improvement to the line and new stations added between Nagoya and Nakajima stations. The tracks between Nakajima and Kinjō-futō stations were raised to remove level crossings and alleviate road congestion. Construction cost around 93 billion yen. The line opened on 6 October 2004, and at the same time, the section of track between Nagoya Station and Nagoya Freight Terminal was closed.

Despite serving attractions such as the Nagoya International Exhibition Hall and Nagoya Racecourse (moved to Yatomi in 2022), passenger ridership figures fell short of targets, and in July 2010, the operating company declared debts of approximately 46 billion yen, applying for alternative dispute resolution (ADR) to avoid bankruptcy.

A special "SL Aonami-go" steam train service operated on the Aonami Line on 16 and 17 February 2013, using JNR Class C56 locomotive number 160 as well as three 12 series passenger coaches.

On 27 March 2017, a special Legoland-themed train started operating on the line to commemorate the opening of Legoland Japan, located near Kinjō-futō Station.

== Infrastructure and operations ==
=== Stations ===
There are two services on the line: Local and Non-stop. Non-stop services only stop at Nagoya and Kinjō-futō.

Picture	Number	Station name	Japanese	Platform type	Distance (km)	Location	Yearly Passengers (2018)	Coords
	AN01	Nagoya	名古屋	1 island platform	0.0	Nakamura-ku, Nagoya	6,871,636	35°10′14.78″N 136°52′53.77″E
	AN02	Sasashima-raibu	ささしまライブ	2 side platforms	0.8	Nakamura-ku, Nagoya	1,157,691	35°9′43″N 136°52′55″E
	AN03	Komoto	小本	1 island platform	3.3	Nakagawa-ku, Nagoya	539,516	35°8′57″N 136°51′41″E
	AN04	Arako	荒子	1 island platform	4.3	Nakagawa-ku, Nagoya	838,137	35°8′24″N 136°51′42.3″E
	AN05	Minami-arako	南荒子	1 island platform	5.2	Nakagawa-ku, Nagoya	553,723	35°7′54″N 136°51′42.55″E
	AN06	Nakajima	中島	2 side platforms	5.9	Nakagawa-ku, Nagoya	1,041,235	35°7′30″N 136°51′41″E
	AN07	Kōhoku	港北	1 island platform	7.1	Minato-ku, Nagoya	1,227,715	35°6′52″N 136°51′46″E
	AN08	Arakogawa-kōen	荒子川公園	2 side platforms	8.2	Minato-ku, Nagoya	1,107,251	35.1046°N 136.8612°E
	AN09	Inaei	稲永	2 side platforms	9.8	Minato-ku, Nagoya	949,349	35°5′29″N 136°51′48″E
	AN10	Noseki	野跡	1 island platform	12.1	Minato-ku, Nagoya	337,130	35°4′31″N 136°51′15″E
	AN11	Kinjō-futō	金城ふ頭	1 island platform	15.2	Minato-ku, Nagoya	1,395,985	35.048833°N 136.849056°E

=== Rolling stock ===
Services on the line are operated by a fleet of eight four-car 1000 series electric multiple unit (EMU) trains. All trains are operated as conductorless "one man cars".

== See also ==
- List of railway lines in Japan
