= China at the 2026 Asian Beach Games =

- IOC code: CHN
- NOC: Chinese Olympic Committee
- Website: www.olympic.cn (in Chinese and English)

in Sanya, China 22–30 April 2026
- Competitors: 171 in 13 sports
- Flag bearers: Shen Ping; Yan Peng
- Medals Ranked 1st: Gold 24 Silver 18 Bronze 13 Total 55

Asian Beach Games appearances
- 2008; 2010; 2012; 2014; 2016; 2026

China hosted the 2026 Asian Beach Games in Sanya, Hainan from 22 to 30 April 2026. This marks the return of the Asian Beach Games, ten years since the 2016 edition in Da Nang, Vietnam. This is the second time China has hosted the tournament, the first being the 2012 edition which was held in.Haiyang, Shandong.

As host, China fielded 171 athletes competing in 13 sports, the largest ever Chinese delegation in the Asian Beach Games. China did not field a team in beach kabaddi. Beach handball athlete Shen Ping and 3x3 basketballer Yan Peng were the flagbearers of China for the opening ceremony.

== Competitors ==
The following is the list of the number of competitors participating at the Games per sport/discipline.

Sport	Men	Women	Total
3x3 basketball	4	4	8
Aquathlon	2	3	5
Beach athletics	12	11	23
Beach handball	10	10	20
Beach soccer	11	0	11
Beach volleyball	4	4	8
Beach water polo	7	7	14
Beach wrestling	4	4	8
Dragon boat	14	14	28
Ju-jitsu	4	6	10
Open water swimming	2	2	4
Sailing	8	8	16
Sport climbing	4	4	8
Teqball	3	3	6
Total	89	80	169

== Medal summary ==
=== Medal by sport ===
Sport	1st place, gold medalist(s)	2nd place, silver medalist(s)	3rd place, bronze medalist(s)	Total
Sailing	5	2	2	9
Dragon boat	5	1	0	6
Sport climbing	3	1	2	6
Aquathlon	3	1	1	5
Open water swimming	3	1	0	4
Beach athletics	2	8	3	13
Beach wrestling	1	2	2	5
Beach water polo	1	1	0	2
3x3 basketball	1	0	1	2
Beach handball	0	1	0	1
Beach volleyball	0	0	1	1
Teqball	0	0	1	1
Total	24	18	13	55

=== Medal by date ===
Medals by date
Date	1st place, gold medalist(s)	2nd place, silver medalist(s)	3rd place, bronze medalist(s)	Total
22 April	Opening ceremony			
23 April	2	1	1	4
24 April	3	1	0	3
25 April	4	6	1	11
26 April	4	3	2	9
27 April	4	0	2	6
28 April	4	3	2	9
29 April	3	3	5	11
30 April	0	1	0	1
Total	24	18	13	55

=== Medalists ===
Medal	Name	Sport	Event	Date
Gold	Fan Junjie	Aquathlon	Men's individual	23 April
Gold	Lin Xinyu	Aquathlon	Women's individual	23 April
Gold	Deng Zhifang; Su Yongqi; Zhao Zhian; Pi Jianxin; Li Qixu; Wu Hao; Guo Biao; Wen Guanglun; Feng Jiadong; Li Yupeng; Zhu Jinglin; Li Zhanhong; Li Guisen; Zhou Guichao	Dragon boat	Men's 100 m	24 April
Gold	Liu Xuelian; Yang Lizhi; Qi Lala; Zhang Xiaofang; Fan Qingqing; Hu Xiao; Zhou Jialu; Sun Shijie; Lin Lin; Li Wen; Cai Xintong; Cui Lu; Guan Peishi; Ou Shihua	Dragon boat	Women's 100 m	24 April
Gold	China women's national water polo team: Zhu Yinqi; Zhao Xinyi; Yin Yiting; Ding Yinghua; Xie Linshan; Yan Xintong; Yang Shengxuan	Beach water polo	Women's team	24 April
Gold	Song Jiayuan	Beach athletics	Women's shot put	25 April
Gold	Liu Xuelian; Yang Lizhi; Qi Lala; Zhang Xiaofang; Fan Qingqing; Hu Xiao; Zhou Jialu; Sun Shijie; Lin Lin; Li Wen; Cai Xintong; Cui Lu; Guan Peishi; Ou Shihua	Dragon boat	Women's 200 m	25 April
Gold	Li Xinxuan	Open water swimming	Women's 5 km	25 April
Gold	Teng Yunfeng; Luo Yunkang; Lu Meiyi; Lin Xinyu	Aquathlon	Mixed relay	25 April
Gold	Zhang Ziyang	Open water swimming	Men's 5 km	26 April
Gold	Huang Youchao; Li Mengyuan; Wang Xinkai; Ailikuti Yishake	Beach athletics	Men's 4×60 m	26 April
Gold	Deng Zhifang; Su Yongqi; Zhao Zhian; Pi Jianxin; Li Qixu; Wu Hao; Guo Biao; Wen Guanglun; Feng Jiadong; Li Yupeng; Zhu Jinglin; Li Zhanhong; Li Guisen; Zhou Guichao	Dragon boat	Men's 400 m	26 April
Gold	Liu Xuelian; Yang Lizhi; Qi Lala; Zhang Xiaofang; Fan Qingqing; Hu Xiao; Zhou Jialu; Sun Shijie; Lin Lin; Li Wen; Cai Xintong; Cui Lu; Guan Peishi; Ou Shihua	Dragon boat	Women's 400 m	26 April
Gold	Liu Peixin; Zhang Ziyang; Li Xinxuan; Chen Yijing	Open water swimming	Mixed 4×1.5 km relay	27 April
Gold	Wang Yiguo	Sailing	Men's Foil windsurfing	27 April
Gold	Chen Yimin	Sailing	Women's Foil windsurfing	27 April
Gold	Yan Guoguo	Sailing	Women's ILCA4	27 April
Gold	Cheng Wenyu	Sailing	Women's optimist	28 April
Gold	Ma Zilin	Sailing	Women's formula kite	28 April
Gold	Zhou Yafei	Sport climbing	Women's individual	28 April
Gold	Zhao Yicheng	Sport climbing	Men's individual	28 April
Gold	China women's national 3x3 team Sun Fengyi; Yang Hengyu; Cao Junwei; Wang Lili	3x3 basketball	Women's team	29 April
Gold	Zhao Yicheng; Long Jianguo	Sport climbing	Men's relay	29 April
Gold	Long Jia	Beach wrestling	Women's 70 kg	29 April
Silver	Teng Yunfeng	Aquathlon	Men's individual	23 April
Silver	Zhang Hao	Beach athletics	Men's high jump	24 April
Silver	Huang Youchao	Beach athletics	Men's 60 m	25 April
Silver	Xu Jialu	Beach athletics	Women's 60 m	25 April
Silver	Tao Yege	Beach athletics	Men's long jump	25 April
Silver	Zhang Linru	Beach athletics	Women's shot put	25 April
Silver	Deng Zhifang; Su Yongqi; Zhao Zhian; Pi Jianxin; Li Qixu; Wu Hao; Guo Biao; Wen Guanglun; Feng Jiadong; Li Yupeng; Zhu Jinglin; Li Zhanhong; Li Guisen; Zhou Guichao	Dragon boat	Men's 200 m	25 April
Silver	Chen Yijing	Open water swimming	Women's 5 km	25 April
Silver	Hu Linpeng	Beach athletics	Women's high jump	26 April
Silver	Shao Yuqi	Beach athletics	Women's high jump	26 April
Silver	Chen Chengyu	Beach athletics	Men's shot put	26 April
Silver	Xue Shiming	Sailing	Men's formula kite	28 April
Silver	Li Shuxuan	Sailing	Women's formula kite	28 April
Silver	Deng Lijuan	Sport climbing	Women's individual	28 April
Silver	China men's national water polo team: Zhang Yiwen; Cai Yuhao; He Xingmeng; Li Diheng; LV Zikang; Li Wanxiang; Ouyang Haiyuan	Beach water polo	Men's team	29 April
Silver	Xie Mengyu	Beach wrestling	Women's 60 kg	29 April
Silver	Lu Da	Beach wrestling	Men's +90 kg	29 April
Silver	China women's national beach handball team: Pan Yi; Zhao Ye; Shen Ping; Liu Chenmeng; Pang Jiaye; Li Weiyu; Wang Qixin; Zhang Xiaomei; Fan Chunyan; Li Rui	Beach handball	Women's team	30 April
Bronze	Lu Meiyi	Aquathlon	Women's individual	23 April
Bronze	Liu Yang	Beach athletics	Men's 60 m	25 April
Bronze	Zhang Haochen	Beach athletics	Men's shot put	26 April
Bronze	Li He; Zhou Jing; Dong Yuehua; Feng Lulu	Beach athletics	Women's 4×60 m	26 April
Bronze	Li Qing	Sailing	Women's Foil windsurfing	27 April
Bronze	Mao Zeming; Gong Fulei	Teqball	Mixed doubles	27 April
Bronze	Yang Xinnuo	Sailing	Men's formula kite	28 April
Bronze	Zhang Shaoqin	Sport climbing	Women's individual	28 April
Bronze	China men's national 3x3 team Ma Diancheng; Qi Haotong; Yan Peng; Luo Xudong	3x3 basketball	Men's team	29 April
Bronze	Zhou Yafei; Deng Lijuan	Sport climbing	Women's relay	29 April
Bronze	Jiang Kaiyue; Dong Jie	Beach volleyball	Women's tournament	29 April
Bronze	Lu Feng	Beach wrestling	Men's 80 kg	29 April
Bronze	Li Wenji	Beach wrestling	Women's +70 kg	29 April

== 3x3 basketball ==
Team	Event	Group Stage				Qualifiers	Quarterfinals	Semifinals	Final / BM	
Team	Event	Opposition Score	Opposition Score	Opposition Score	Rank	Opposition Score	Opposition Score	Opposition Score	Opposition Score	Rank
China men's	Men's team	Philippines; L 18–21	Iran; W 14–13	Macau; W 21–9	3 Q	Singapore; W 21–15	Malaysia; W 22–15	Qatar; L 16–18	Philippines; W 21–13	3rd place, bronze medalist(s)
China women's	Women's team	Kazakhstan; W 22–8	Qatar; W 21–5	—N/a	1 Q	—N/a	Chinese Taipei; W 21–9	Thailand; W 18–16	Philippines; W 21–13	1st place, gold medalist(s)

== Beach athletics ==
Track

Athlete	Event	Heat		Final	
Athlete	Event	Time	Rank	Time	Rank
Liu Yang	Men's 60 m	6.90	1 Q	6.74	3rd place, bronze medalist(s)
Huang Youchao	Men's 60 m	6.75	1 Q	6.67	2nd place, silver medalist(s)
Ailikuti Yishake; Chang Ji; Li Mengyuan; Wang Xinkai	Men's 4x60 m	—N/a		26.06	1st place, gold medalist(s)
Li He	Women's 60 m	7.65	1 Q	7.64	5
Xu Jialu	Women's 60 m	7.60	2 Q	7.49	2nd place, silver medalist(s)
Zhou Jing; Dong Yuehua; Feng Lulu; Xu Jialu	Women's 4x60 m	—N/a		30.42	3rd place, bronze medalist(s)

Field

Athlete	Event	Final	
Athlete	Event	Result	Rank
Zhang Hao	Men's high jump	2.05	2nd place, silver medalist(s)
Li Jialun	Men's high jump	2.00	4
Zheng Chengzhuo	Men's long jump	7.13	5
Tao Yege	Men's long jump	7.41	2nd place, silver medalist(s)
Chen Chengyu	Men's shot put	19.95	2nd place, silver medalist(s)
Zhang Haochen	Men's shot put	19.69	3rd place, bronze medalist(s)
Hu Linpeng	Women's high jump	1.83	2nd place, silver medalist(s)
Shao Yuqi	Women's high jump	1.83	2nd place, silver medalist(s)
Chen Liwen	Women's long jump	5.72	5
Li Zhishuang	Women's long jump	5.17	10
Song Jiayuan	Women's shot put	19.15	1st place, gold medalist(s)
Zhang Linru	Women's shot put	18.27	2nd place, silver medalist(s)

== Aquathlon ==
2 male and 3 female athletes represented China in the sport.

Athlete	Event	Result	
Athlete	Event	Time	Rank
Fan Junjie	Men's individual	28:20	1st place, gold medalist(s)
Teng Yunfeng	Men's individual	28:30	2nd place, silver medalist(s)
Lin Xinyu	Women's individual	31:34	1st place, gold medalist(s)
Lu Meiyi	Women's individual	32:32	3rd place, bronze medalist(s)
Teng Yunfeng; Luo Yunkang; Lu Meiyi; Lin Xinyu	Mixed relay	1:01:44	1st place, gold medalist(s)

== Beach handball ==
Summary

Event	Group Stage							Semifinals	Final / BM
Event	Opposition Score	Opposition Score	Opposition Score	Opposition Score	Opposition Score	Rank	Opposition Score	Opposition Score	Rank
Men's team	Bahrain; L 0–2	Sri Lanka; W 2–0	Hong Kong; W 2–0	Philippines; W 2–1	Iran; L 0–2	3	Did not advance		
Women's team	Mongolia; W 2–0	Sri Lanka; W 2–0	Turkmenistan; W 2–0	—N/a		1 Q	Thailand; W 2–1	Vietnam; L 1–2	2nd place, silver medalist(s)

== Beach soccer ==
Team	Event	Group Stage			Semifinals	Final	
Team	Event	Opposition Score	Opposition Score	Rank	Opposition Score	Opposition Score	Rank
China men's	Men's team	Palestine; L 3–4	Oman; L 1–4	3	Did not advance		

== Beach volleyball ==
Athlete	Event	Preliminary round					Round of 16	Quarterfinals	Semifinal	Final	
Athlete	Event	Opposition Score	Opposition Score	Opposition Score	Opposition Score	Rank	Opposition Score	Opposition Score	Opposition Score	Opposition Score	Rank
Zhang Tai; Zhou Chaowei	Men's	Rangdal / Dorji (BHU); W 2–0 (21–12, 21–11)	Manikkuhewage / Andibuduge (SRI); W 2–0 (21–12, 21–17)	Alsakka / Albirini (SYR); W 2–0 (21–11, 21–13)	Pourasgari / Aghajanighasab (IRI); L 0–2 (18–21, 17–21)	2 Q	Nakprakhong / Taovato (THA); W 2–1 (18–21, 21–17, 15–12)	Younousse / Tijan (QAT); L 0–2 (10–21, 19–21)	Did not advance		
Wang Yanwei; Wu Jiaxin	Men's	Tam / Tai (MAC); W 2–0 (21–9, 21–9)	Mahfouz / Aljorfi (KSA); W 2–0 (21–12, 21–12)	Zainelabedin / Mou (QAT); W 2–0 (21–19, 21–17)	—N/a	1 Q	Khakizadeh / Ghalehnovi (IRI); L 0–2 (18–21, 15–21)	Did not advance			
Dong Jie; Jiang Kaiyue	Women's	Wattelage / Alawaththage (SRI); W 2–0 (21–4, 21–5)	Abuissa / Bahmanzadeh (QAT); W 2–0 (21–8, 21–3)	—N/a		1 Q	Sari / Kaize (INA); W 2–0 (21–11, 21–9)	Ito / Ishii (JPN); W 2–0 (28–26, 21–17)	Kongphopsarutawadee / Naraphornrapat (THA); L 1–2 (21–19, 16–21, 11–15)	Mungkhon / Seehawong (THA); W 2–1 (21–14, 18–21, 15–13)	3rd place, bronze medalist(s)
Zhou Mingli; Kadeliye Halaiti	Women's	M Kyzy / Kudaikulova (KGZ); W 2–0 (21–12, 21–11)	Kim / Shin (KOR); W 2–0 (21–11, 21–11)	—N/a		1 Q	Leong / Law (MAC); W 2–0 (21–11, 21–11)	Mungkhon / Seehawong (THA); L 1–2 (21–15, 17–21, 11–15)	Did not advance		

== Beach water polo ==
Team	Event	Round Robin					
Team	Event	Opposition Score	Opposition Score	Opposition Score	Opposition Score	Opposition Score	Rank
China men's	Men's Team	South Korea; W 3–1	Thailand; W 3–0	Hong Kong; W 3–0	Kazakhstan; W 3–0	Iran; L 2–3 (PSO)	2nd place, silver medalist(s)
China women's	Women's Team	Hong Kong; W 3–1	Thailand; W 3–0	Kazakhstan; W 3–1	—N/a		1st place, gold medalist(s)

== Beach wrestling ==
Athlete	Event	Knockout	Group stage				Quarterfinals	Semifinals	Final	
Athlete	Event	Opposition Score	Opposition Score	Opposition Score	Opposition Score	Rank	Opposition Score	Opposition Score	Opposition Score	Rank
Ou Xuexian	Men's 70kg	Yamada (JPN); L 0–2	Did not advance							
Lu Feng	Men's 80 kg	—N/a	Al-Khaledi (SYR); W 3–0	Al-Rashdi (KSA); W Fall	Ishihara (JPN); W 2–0	1 Q	Ishihara (JPN); W 3–0	Ullah (PAK); L 0–4	Koshkinbayev (KAZ); W 3–0	3rd place, bronze medalist(s)
Li Peilong	Men's 90 kg	—N/a	Makoon (JOR); L 0–2	Al-Refaei (SYR); W 4–0	Nazarov (TJK); W 3–2	2 Q	Uulu (KGZ); W 3–0	Kavousi (IRI); L 0–3	Turbold (KAZ); L 1–3	4
Lu Da	Men's +90 kg	—N/a	Jaspooran (IND); W 3–1	Kurbonaliev (TJK); W 3–0	Roberts (PHI); W 3–0	1 Q	Altangerel (MGL); W 1–0	Zhappuev (KGZ); W Fall	Sahraei (IRI); L 0–3	2nd place, silver medalist(s)
Liang Jinyue	Women's 50 kg	—N/a	Dit (CAM); W Fall	Ganikyzy (KAZ); W 2–0	Pedige (SRI); L 0–3	2	Did not advance			
Xie Menyu	Women's 60 kg	—N/a	Cheng (TPE); W 3–0	Davaajargalyn (MGL); W 3–0	Satybaeva (KGZ); W 3–1	1 Q	—N/a	Nguyễn (VIE); W 3–2	Yadav (IND); L 0–3	2nd place, silver medalist(s)
Long Jia	Women's 70 kg	—N/a	Sharshebaeva (KGZ); W 2–0	Đặng (VIE); W 1–0	Abukheit (JOR); W 3–0	1 Q	—N/a	Seidualy (KAZ); W 3–1	Đặng (VIE); W Fall	1st place, gold medalist(s)
Li Wenji	Women's +70 kg	—N/a	Jeong (KOR); W 2–0	Cai (TPE); W 3–0	Zorigtyn (MGL); L 0–3	2 Q	—N/a	Malik (IND); L 0–2	Yertostik (KAZ); W 2–0	3rd place, bronze medalist(s)

== Dragon boat ==
Athlete	Event	Heat		Final	
Athlete	Event	Time	Rank	Time	Rank
Deng Zhifang; Feng Jiadong; Guo Biao; Li Guisen; Li Qixu; Li Yupeng; Li Zhanhong; Pi Jianxin; Su Yongqi; Wen Guanglun; Wu Hao; Zhao Zhian; Zhou Guichao; Zhu Jinglin	Men's 100 m	24.555	1 Q	24.076	1st place, gold medalist(s)
Deng Zhifang; Feng Jiadong; Guo Biao; Li Guisen; Li Qixu; Li Yupeng; Li Zhanhong; Pi Jianxin; Su Yongqi; Wen Guanglun; Wu Hao; Zhao Zhian; Zhou Guichao; Zhu Jinglin	Men's 200 m	45.676	1 Q	45.801	2nd place, silver medalist(s)
Deng Zhifang; Feng Jiadong; Guo Biao; Li Guisen; Li Qixu; Li Yupeng; Li Zhanhong; Pi Jianxin; Su Yongqi; Wen Guanglun; Wu Hao; Zhao Zhian; Zhou Guichao; Zhu Jinglin	Men's 400 m	1:37.884	1 Q	1:34.990	1st place, gold medalist(s)
Cai Xintong; Cui Lu; Fan Qingqing; Guan Peishi; Hu Xiao; Li Wen; Lin Lin; Liu Xuelian; Ou Shihua; Qi Lala; Sun Shijie; Yang Lizhi; Zhang Xiaofang; Zhou Jialu	Women's 100 m	26.562	1 Q	28.260	1st place, gold medalist(s)
Cai Xintong; Cui Lu; Fan Qingqing; Guan Peishi; Hu Xiao; Li Wen; Lin Lin; Liu Xuelian; Ou Shihua; Qi Lala; Sun Shijie; Yang Lizhi; Zhang Xiaofang; Zhou Jialu	Women's 200 m	54.375	1 Q	51.964	1st place, gold medalist(s)
Cai Xintong; Cui Lu; Fan Qingqing; Guan Peishi; Hu Xiao; Li Wen; Lin Lin; Liu Xuelian; Ou Shihua; Qi Lala; Sun Shijie; Yang Lizhi; Zhang Xiaofang; Zhou Jialu	Women's 400 m	1:46.297	1 Q	1:48.899	1st place, gold medalist(s)

== Ju-jitsu ==
Athlete	Event	Round of 32	Round of 16	Quarterfinals	Semifinals	Repechage	Final / BM	
Athlete	Event	Opposition Result	Opposition Result	Opposition Result	Opposition Result	Opposition Result	Opposition Result	Rank
Lan Youzhe	Men's −62 kg	—N/a	Ajaj (PLE); L 0–50 SUB	Did not advance				
Wang Yayong	Men's −69 kg	Hussaini (AFG); L 0–50 SUB	Did not advance					
Tu Buxin	Men's −69 kg	Jabr (UAE); L 0–0 WO	Did not advance					
Wang Zhiyu	Men's −77 kg	Boymurodov (TJK); L 0–8 PTS	Did not advance					
Lu Yue	Women's −52 kg	Trần (VIE); W 50–0 SUB	Alhosani (UAE); L 0–50 SUB	Did not advance				
Huang Yu	Women's −52 kg	—N/a	Kulumbetova (KAZ); L 0–50 SUB	Did not advance				
Zhang Mengqi	Women's −57 kg	Alhammadi (UAE); W 0–0 ADV	Ramirez (PHI); L 0–50 SUB	Did not advance				
Zhang Shiying	Women's −57 kg	—N/a	Alameri (UAE); L 0–50 DSQ	Did not advance				
Guan Chunming	Women's −63 kg	—N/a	Salykova (KAZ); L 0–0 PTS	Did not advance				
Xu Xintong	Women's −63 kg	—N/a	Enriquez (PHI); L 0–50 SUB	Did not advance				

== Open water swimming ==
4 swimmers represented China in three events.

Athlete	Event	Result	
Athlete	Event	Time	Rank
Liu Peixin	Men's 5 km	55:41.6	6
Zhang Ziyang	Men's 5 km	53:46.0	1st place, gold medalist(s)
Chen Yijing	Women's 5 km	1:01:43.2	2nd place, silver medalist(s)
Li Xinxuan	Women's 5 km	1:01:33.6	1st place, gold medalist(s)
Liu Peixin; Zhang Ziyang; Chen Yijing; Li Xinxuan	Mixed 4x1.5 km relay	1:05:26.8	1st place, gold medalist(s)

== Sailing ==
16 sailors from China qualified for the games.

Men

Athlete	Event	Race															Total	
Athlete	Event	1	2	3	4	5	6	7	8	9	10	11	12	13	14	15	Points	Rank
Wang Yaxuan	Optimist	8	4	1	~~(23)~~	7	13	7	8	12	1	—N/a					61	7
Xu Youjia	Optimist	5	8	14	3	~~(23)~~	1	9	10	4	10	—N/a					64	8
Fu Fengziyi	ILCA4	8	2	1	7	~~(18)~~	3	3	12	12	X	—N/a					48	5
Zhuang Jiahao	ILCA4	11	10	5	25	3	16	4	25	~~(17)~~	X	—N/a					99	14
Lu Xibin	Foil windsurfing	~~(12)~~	~~(12)~~	12	3	12	8	2	1	1	2	4	8	12	X	X	65	5
Wang Yiguo	Foil windsurfing	~~(2)~~	1	1	1	1	1	1	~~(2)~~	2	1	1	1	1	X	X	12	1st place, gold medalist(s)
Xue Shiming	Formula kite	2	~~(10)~~	3	2	2	~~(10)~~	1	2	1	1	10	2	1	2	2	31	2nd place, silver medalist(s)
Yang Xinnuo	Formula kite	~~(10)~~	~~(10)~~	1	10	3	1	2	3	3	2	1	3	3	1	3	36	3rd place, bronze medalist(s)

Women

Athlete	Event	Race															Total	
Athlete	Event	1	2	3	4	5	6	7	8	9	10	11	12	13	14	15	Points	Rank
Cheng Wenyu	Optimist	~~(7)~~	1	1	1	1	1	1	1	2	1	—N/a					10	1st place, gold medalist(s)
Ni Yijia	Optimist	4	4	4	~~(12)~~	3	7	2	2	5	4	—N/a					35	4
Wang Yage	ILCA4	9	~~(21)~~	3	9	7	1	3	11	7	X	—N/a					50	7
Yan Guoguo	ILCA4	4	~~(7)~~	1	2	2	4	1	4	1	X	—N/a					19	1st place, gold medalist(s)
Chen Yimin	Foil windsurfing	1	2	1	~~(11)~~	2	~~(4)~~	1	1	4	2	3	1	X	X	X	18	1st place, gold medalist(s)
Li Qing	Foil windsurfing	2	5	~~(11)~~	2	1	1	3	2	2	1	5	~~(11)~~	X	X	X	24	3rd place, bronze medalist(s)
Li Shuxuan	Formula kite	1	~~(2)~~	~~(2)~~	2	2	2	1	2	1	2	2	2	1	1	X	19	2nd place, silver medalist(s)
Ma Zilin	Formula kite	~~(2)~~	1	1	1	1	1	~~2~~	1	2	1	1	1	2	2	X	15	1st place, gold medalist(s)

== Sport climbing ==
Athlete	Event	Qualification		Round of 16	Quarterfinal	Semifinal	Final	Rank
Athlete	Event	Time	Rank	Round of 16	Quarterfinal	Semifinal	Final	Rank
Zhao Yicheng	Men's individual	4.58 WR	1 Q	Shin (KOR); W 4.69–5.04	Limpanichpakdee (THA); W 4.66–4.87	Chu (CHN); W 4.62–4.87	Al-Hilmi (INA); W FS	1st place, gold medalist(s)
Long Jianguo	Men's individual	4.81	3 Q	Shuto (JPN); W 4.92–Fall	Khaibullin (KAZ); L 10.00–4.84	Did not advance		
Wu Peng	Men's individual	4.97	8 Q	Limpanichpakdee (THA); L Fall–5.16	Did not advance			
Chu Shouhong	Men's individual	5.056	12 Q	Syahria (INA); W 4.94–4.97	Nursamsa (INA); W 5.20–6.57	Zhao (CHN); L 4.87–4.62	Khaibullin (KAZ); L 4.84–4.81	4
Zhou Yafei	Women's individual	6.34	2 Q	Balarshina (KAZ); W 6.65–7.71	Sung (KOR); W 6.44–6.70	Zhang (CHN); W 6.39–6.42	Deng (CHN); W 6.35–6.43	1st place, gold medalist(s)
Deng Lijuan	Women's individual	6.70	5 Q	Kawakami (JPN); W 6.87–7.62	Asih (INA); W 6.55–6.58	Qin (CHN); W 6.45–Fall	Zhou (CHN); L 6.43–6.35	2nd place, silver medalist(s)
Zhang Shaoqin	Women's individual	6.80	6 Q	Hwang (KOR); W 6.69–7.30	Lestari (INA); W 6.68–7.44	Zhou (CHN); L 6.42–6.39	Qin (CHN); W 6.54–6.67	3rd place, bronze medalist(s)
Qin Yumei	Women's individual	6.94	8 Q	Mutia (INA); W 6.80–7.14	Dewi (INA); W 11.96–Fall	Deng (CHN); L Fall–6.45	Zhang (CHN); L 6.67–6.54	4
Zhao Yicheng; Long Jianguo	Men's relay	10.35	3 Q	Jirajaturapak / Suwannarat (THA); W 12.00–FS	Jung / Shin (KOR); W 10.04–11.17	Limpanichpakdee / Bunprakop (THA); W FS	Nursamsa / Al-Hilmi (INA); W 9.75–9.80 WR	1st place, gold medalist(s)
Wu Peng; Chu Shouhong	Men's relay	11.12	8 Q	Choi / Lee (KOR); W 10.90–14.17	Nursamsa / Al-Hilmi (INA); L FS	Did not advance		
Zhou Yafei; Deng Lijuan	Women's relay	13.50	1 Q	—N/a	Balarshina / Ulzhabayeva (KAZ); W 13.98–18.32	Dewi / Asih (INA); L 13.178–13.174	Takeuchi / Kawakami (JPN); W 13.21–17.85	3rd place, bronze medalist(s)
Zhang Shaoqin; Qin Yumei	Women's relay	13.92	2 Q	—N/a	Takeuchi / Kawakami (JPN); L Fall–17.07	Did not advance		

== Teqball ==
Athlete	Event	Preliminary round					Quarterfinals	Semifinals	Final	
Athlete	Event	Opposition Score	Opposition Score	Opposition Score	Opposition Score	Rank	Opposition Score	Opposition Score	Opposition Score	Rank
Sun Zhixu; Zhang Junming	Men's doubles	Abdullah / Danish (MAS); W 2–0 (12–11, 12–5)	Trường / Lê (VIE); W 2–0 (12–10, 12–11)	—N/a		1 Q	Friday / Tun (MYA); L 1–2 (9–12, 12–11, 9–12)	Did not advance		
Cui Yazhen; Shi Huhong	Women's doubles	Cruz / Cariño (PHI); W 2–0 (12–1, 12–5)	Abed / Sadeq (IRQ); W 2–0 (12–7, 12–6)	Win / Aung (MYA); L 0–2 (5–12, 10–12)	Cha / Kim (PRK); L 0–2 (8–12, 5–12)	3	Did not advance			
Mao Zheming; Gong Fulei	Mixed doubles	Tabucol / Polca (PHI); W 2–0 (12–1, 12–2)	Dy / Bun (CAM); W 2–0 (12–9, 12–10)	—N/a		1 Q	Hafez / Dandal (LBN); W 2–0 (12–9, 12–10)	Han / Kim (PRK); L 0–2 (8–12, 3–12)	Did not advance	3rd place, bronze medalist(s)
