= Iran at the 2026 Asian Beach Games =

Iran at multi-sport events

- IOC code: IRI
- NOC: National Olympic Committee of the Islamic Republic of Iran

in Sanya
- Competitors: 57 in 10 sports
- Flag bearer: Mehdi Shirmohammadi
- Medals Ranked 3rd: Gold 9 Silver 1 Bronze 0 Total 10

Asian Beach Games appearances
- 2008; 2010; 2012; 2014; 2016; 2026

Iran competed at the 2026 Asian Beach Games in Sanya, China from 22 to 30 April 2026. This made the return of the Asian Beach Games, ten years since the 2016 edition in Da Nang, Vietnam. The delegation had 57 athletes, all male.

== Competitors ==
Sport	Men	Women	Total
3x3 basketball	4		4
4x4 water polo	7		7
Beach athletics	5		5
Beach handball	10		10
Beach kabaddi	6		6
Beach soccer	12		12
Beach volleyball	4		4
Beach wrestling	4		4
Ju-jitsu	2		2
Sport climbing	3		3
Total	57	0	57

== Medal summary ==
=== Medals by sport ===
Sport	Gold	Silver	Bronze	Total
4x4 water polo	1			1
Beach athletics	1			1
Beach handball	1			1
Beach kabaddi	1			1
Beach soccer	1			1
Beach volleyball		1		1
Beach wrestling	4			4
Total	9	1	0	10

=== Medalists ===
Medal	Name	Sport	Event
Gold	Hamed Karimi; Alireza Mehri; Amin Ghavidel; Hossein Lalehsiah; Mehdi Yazdankhah; Arman Shams; Ashkan Iranpour	4x4 water polo	Men
Gold	Hassan Ajami	Beach athletics	Men's shot put
Gold	Arad Hosseini; Hossein Heidarian; Parsa Dehghani; Mohammad Mehdi Heidarianpour; Ali Heidarian; Ali Shirani; Matin Goldan; Alireza Alipour; Alireza Pirzadeh; Amin Kazemi	Beach handball	Men
Gold	Mobin Nazari; Mahan Faraji; Moslem Rashki; Ali Sourtechi; Mohammad Mallak; Amir Hossein Alizadeh	Beach kabaddi	Men
Gold	Mehdi Mirjalili; Reza Dayyeri; Davoud Shokri; Saeid Piramoun; Ali Nazem; Mehdi Shirmohammadi; Ali Mirshekari; Movahed Mohammadpour; Mohammad Ali Mokhtari; Mohammad Ali Nazarzadeh; Mohammad Masoumizadeh; Mohammad Dastan	Beach soccer	Men
Gold	Ali Akbar Zaroudi	Beach wrestling	Men's 70 kg
Gold	Ali Gholami	Beach wrestling	Men's 80 kg
Gold	Amir Hossein Kavousi	Beach wrestling	Men's 90 kg
Gold	Amir Reza Sahraei	Beach wrestling	Men's +90 kg
Silver	Abolhassan Khakizadeh; Amir Ali Ghalehnovi	Beach volleyball	Men

== Results by event ==
=== 3x3 basketball ===
Athlete	Event	Preliminary round				Round of 16	Quarterfinal	Semifinal	Final	Rank
Athlete	Event	Round 1	Round 2	Round 3	Rank	Round of 16	Quarterfinal	Semifinal	Final	Rank
Peter Grigorian; Mohammad Ghaffari; Mohammad Mehdi Rahimi; Amir Hossein Yazarloo	Men	Macau; W 21–9	China; L 13–14	Philippines; W 21–14	2 Q	Hong Kong; W 21–15	Qatar; L 16–20	Did not advance		6

=== Aquatics ===
==== 4x4 water polo ====
Team	Event	Round robin					Rank
Team	Event	Round 1	Round 2	Round 3	Round 4	Round 5	Rank
Iran	Men	Hong Kong; W 3–1 (4–3, 2–3, 3–2, 4–0)	South Korea; W 3–0 (4–3, 3–2, 5–2)	Kazakhstan; W 3–2 (1–2, 4–5, 3–2, 2–1, 3–2)	Thailand; W 3–0 (4–2, 6–1, 5–4)	China; W 3–2 (1–2, 3–2, 4–1, 2–3, 3–2)	1st place, gold medalist(s)
Roster: Hamed Karimi; Alireza Mehri; Amin Ghavidel; Hossein Lalehsiah; Mehdi Yazdankhah; Arman Shams; Ashkan Iranpour; Coach: Hamid Ghodsinejad

=== Beach athletics ===
Athlete	Event	Round 1		Final	Rank
Athlete	Event	Time	Rank	Time / Result	Rank
Amir Reza Moeinpour	Men's 60 m	7.07	5	Did not advance	13
Parsa Shadnia	Men's high jump	—N/a		2.00 m	6
Mojtaba Zahedi	Men's long jump	—N/a		6.81 m	10
Hassan Ajami	Men's shot put	—N/a		20.17 m	1st place, gold medalist(s)
Mehran Khorand	Men's shot put	—N/a		17.63 m	4

=== Beach handball ===
Team	Event	Preliminary round						Semifinal	Final	Rank
Team	Event	Round 1	Round 2	Round 3	Round 4	Round 5	Rank	Semifinal	Final	Rank
Iran	Men	Philippines; W 2–0 (14–10, 21–20)	Sri Lanka; W 2–0 (18–12, 22–10)	Hong Kong; W 2–0 (13–8, 20–6)	Bahrain; W 2–0 (18–16, 18–16)	China; W 2–0 (21–14, 20–10)	1 Q	Thailand; W 2–1 (19–16, 16–18, 8–6)	Qatar; W 2–1 (18–10, 10–15, 9–6)	1st place, gold medalist(s)
Roster: Arad Hosseini; Hossein Heidarian; Parsa Dehghani; Mohammad Mehdi Heidarianpour; Ali Heidarian; Ali Shirani; Matin Goldan; Alireza Alipour; Alireza Pirzadeh; Amin Kazemi; Coach: Mehdi Ghashghaeirad

=== Beach kabaddi ===
Team	Event	Preliminary round				Semifinal	Final	Rank
Team	Event	Round 1	Round 2	Round 3	Rank	Semifinal	Final	Rank
Iran	Men	Pakistan; W 38–28	Bangladesh; W 47–31	Syria; W 53–31	1 Q	Sri Lanka; W 42–29	India; W 44–31	1st place, gold medalist(s)
Roster: Mobin Nazari; Mahan Faraji; Moslem Rashki; Ali Sourtechi; Mohammad Mallak; Amir Hossein Alizadeh; Coach: Farhad Kamal Gharibi

=== Beach soccer ===
Team	Event	Preliminary round				Semifinal	Final	Rank
Team	Event	Round 1	Round 2	Round 3	Rank	Semifinal	Final	Rank
Iran	Men	United Arab Emirates; W 5–2	Thailand; W 13–1	Saudi Arabia; W 2–1	1 Q	Palestine; W 9–1	Oman; W 6–2	1st place, gold medalist(s)
Roster: Mehdi Mirjalili; Reza Dayyeri; Davoud Shokri; Saeid Piramoun; Ali Nazem; Mehdi Shirmohammadi; Ali Mirshekari; Movahed Mohammadpour; Mohammad Ali Mokhtari; Mohammad Ali Nazarzadeh; Mohammad Masoumizadeh; Mohammad Dastan; Coach: Ali Naderi

=== Beach volleyball ===
Athlete	Event	Preliminary round					Round of 16	Quarterfinal	Semifinal	Final	Rank
Athlete	Event	Round 1	Round 2	Round 3	Round 4	Rank	Round of 16	Quarterfinal	Semifinal	Final	Rank
Abolhassan Khakizadeh; Amir Ali Ghalehnovi	Men	Dauilbaev and Tolibaev (UZB); W 2–0 (21–16, 21–18)	Sajid and Naseem (MDV); W 2–0 (21–15, 21–10)	Younousse and Tijan (QAT); L 1–2 (11–21, 23–21, 10–15)	—N/a	2 Q	Wang and Wu (CHN); W 2–0 (21–18, 21–15)	El-Chabib and Abi Karam (LBN); W 2–0 (21–10, 21–14)	Al-Jalbubi and Al-Hashmi (OMA); W 2–1 (21–17, 15–21, 15–13)	Younousse and Tijan (QAT); L 0–2 (15–21, 12–21)	2nd place, silver medalist(s)
Abbas Pourasgari; Alireza Aghajani	Men	Sandeepana and Madusanka (SRI); W 2–0 (21–12, 21–15)	Rangdal and Dorji (BHU); W 2–0 (21–8, 21–9)	Zhang and Zhou (CHN); W 2–0 (21–18, 21–17)	Al-Sakka and Al-Birini (SYR); W 2–0 (21–8, 21–9)	1 Q	Kurokawa and Ikeda (JPN); W 2–0 (21–15, 21–17)	Al-Jalbubi and Al-Hashmi (OMA); L 1–2 (21–14, 17–21, 9–15)	Did not advance		5

=== Beach wrestling ===
Athlete	Event	Knockout	Group round				Quarterfinal	Semifinal	Final	Rank
Athlete	Event	Knockout	Round 1	Round 2	Round 3	Rank	Quarterfinal	Semifinal	Final	Rank
Ali Akbar Zaroudi	Men's 70 kg	Bye	Meslah (JOR); W 3–0	Chhillar (IND); W 3–0	Al-Naimi (QAT); W WO	1 Q	Al-Bakri (KSA); W 3–1	Rakhat Uulu (KGZ); W 2–0	Chhillar (IND); W 3–0	1st place, gold medalist(s)
Ali Gholami	Men's 80 kg	Bye	Khazragi (YEM); W Fall (5–0)	Bakhromov (TJK); W 3–0	Azizbaev (KGZ); W Fall (4–0)	1 Q	Asluev (BRN); W 3–0	Koshkinbayev (KAZ); W Fall (4–0)	Ullah (PAK); W Fall (3–0)	1st place, gold medalist(s)
Amir Hossein Kavousi	Men's 90 kg	Premarathna (SRI); W 2–0 (3–0, 3–0)	Sharipov (BRN); W Fall (5–0)	Ngô (VIE); W 3–0	Chow (SGP); W 3–0	1 Q	Aryan (IND); W 3–0	Li (CHN); W 3–0	Inam (PAK); W 3–0	1st place, gold medalist(s)
Amir Reza Sahraei	Men's +90 kg	—N/a	Sharfawi (SYR); W 3–0	Zhappuev (KGZ); W 3–0	Eyubov (KAZ); W Fall (4–0)	1 Q	Mohammed (KSA); W 3–0	Sharipov (BRN); W Fall (5–0)	Lu (CHN); W 3–0	1st place, gold medalist(s)

=== Ju-jitsu ===
Jiu-jitsu

Athlete	Event	Round of 32	Round of 16	Quarterfinal	Semifinal	Final	Rank
Ali Nazemi	Men's 62 kg	Operana (CAM); L SUB (0–0)	Did not advance				17
Pejvak Zarinmah	Men's 77 kg	Saleh (KSA); L 0–2	Did not advance				17

=== Sport climbing ===
Athlete	Event	Qualification		Round of 16	Quarterfinal	Semifinal	Final	Rank
Athlete	Event	Time	Rank	Round of 16	Quarterfinal	Semifinal	Final	Rank
Milad Alipour	Men's speed	5.37	18	Did not advance				18
Reza Alipour	Men's speed	5.18	13 Q	Nursamsa (INA); L Fall–5.15	Did not advance			14
Mohammad Reza Sohrabi	Men's speed	5.60	20	Did not advance				20
Milad Alipour; Reza Alipour	Men's speed relay	13.15	13 Q	Khaibullin and Khaibullin (KAZ); L FS–12.46	Did not advance			13
