= Vietnam at the 2026 Asian Beach Games =

- IOC code: VIE
- NOC: Vietnam Olympic Committee
- Website: voc.org.vn (in Vietnamese and English)

in Sanya, China 22–30 April 2026
- Flag bearers: Bá Trường Giang; Lư Ngọc Trinh
- Medals Ranked 4th: Gold 3 Silver 5 Bronze 5 Total 13

Asian Beach Games appearances
- 2008; 2010; 2012; 2014; 2016; 2026

Vietnam competed at the 2026 Asian Beach Games in Sanya, China from 22 to 30 April 2026.

Bá Trường Giang (teqball) and Lư Ngọc Trinh (beach handball) was the country's flag bearer during the opening ceremony.

== Competitors ==
The following is the list of the number of competitors participating at the Games per sport/discipline.

| Sport | Men | Women | Total |
|---|---|---|---|
| Beach athletics | 1 | 4 | 5 |
| Beach handball | 0 | 10 | 10 |
| Beach wrestling | 3 | 4 | 7 |
| Dragon boat | 0 | 14 | 14 |
| Ju-jitsu | 3 | 4 | 7 |
| Open water swimming | 2 | 3 | 5 |
| Sailing | 1 | 1 | 2 |
| Teqball | 3 | 2 | 5 |
| Total | 13 | 42 | 55 |

== Medalists ==
Source: OCA

=== Gold ===
| No. | Medal | Name | Sport | Event | Date |
|---|---|---|---|---|---|
| 1 | Gold | Hà Thị Thúy Hằng | Beach athletics | Women's Long jump | 24 Apr |
| 2 | Gold | Phạm Văn Nghĩa | Beach athletics | Men's Long jump | 25 Apr |
| 3 | Gold | Nguyễn Thị Nhung; Lư Ngọc Trinh; Nguyễn Thị Phương Linh; Phạm Thị Mỹ Hằng; Hà Thị Hạnh; Đàm Thị Thanh Huyền; Nguyễn Thị Ánh Tuyết; Nguyễn Thị Thuỳ Dung; Trần Hải Yến; Nguyễn Thị Trà My | Beach handball | Women's tournament | 30 Apr |

=== Silver ===
| No. | Medal | Name | Sport | Event | Date |
|---|---|---|---|---|---|
| 1 | Silver | Hồ Thị Nè; Diệp Thị Thuý; Vũ Thị Ngọc Uyên; Lê Thị Phương Minh; Lý Thị Thuý; Phùng Thị Ngọc Diễm; Lê Thị Lan Anh; Nguyễn Thị Lợi; Mạc Thị Thanh Thúy; Mạc Thị Thương; Bùi Thị Yến; Ma Thị Thuý; Nguyễn Thị Tâm; Nguyễn Thị Hải Anh | Dragon boat | Women's 100 m | 24 Apr |
| 2 | Silver | Nguyễn Huy Hoàng | Open water swimming | Men's 5 km | 26 Apr |
| 3 | Silver | Nguyễn Huy Hoàng; Mai Trần Tuấn Anh; Võ Thị Mỹ Tiên; Nguyễn Khả Nhi | Open water swimming | Team rely | 27 Apr |
| 4 | Silver | Đoàn Thị Kim Oanh | Beach wrestling | Women's 50kg | 29 Apr |
| 5 | Silver | Đặng Thị Linh | Beach wrestling | Women's 70kg | 29 Apr |

=== Bronze ===
| No. | Medal | Name | Sport | Event | Date |
|---|---|---|---|---|---|
| 1 | Bronze | Hồ Thị Nè; Diệp Thị Thuý; Vũ Thị Ngọc Uyên; Lê Thị Phương Minh; Lý Thị Thuý; Phùng Thị Ngọc Diễm; Lê Thị Lan Anh; Nguyễn Thị Lợi; Mạc Thị Thanh Thúy; Mạc Thị Thương; Bùi Thị Yến; Ma Thị Thuý; Nguyễn Thị Tâm; Nguyễn Thị Hải Anh | Dragon boat | Women's 200 m | 25 Apr |
| 2 | Bronze | Võ Thị Mỹ Tiên | Open water swimming | Women's 5 km | 25 Apr |
| 3 | Bronze | Mai Trần Tuấn Anh | Open water swimming | Men's 5 km | 26 Apr |
| 4 | Bronze | Hồ Thị Nè; Diệp Thị Thuý; Vũ Thị Ngọc Uyên; Lê Thị Phương Minh; Lý Thị Thuý; Phùng Thị Ngọc Diễm; Lê Thị Lan Anh; Nguyễn Thị Lợi; Mạc Thị Thanh Thúy; Mạc Thị Thương; Bùi Thị Yến; Ma Thị Thuý; Nguyễn Thị Tâm; Nguyễn Thị Hải Anh | Dragon boat | Women's 400 m | 26 Apr |
| 5 | Bronze | Nguyễn Thị Mỹ Hạnh | Beach wrestling | Women's 60kg | 29 Apr |

== Medal summary ==
Source: OCA (1), OCA (2)

=== By sports ===
| Sport | 1st place, gold medalist(s) | 2nd place, silver medalist(s) | 3rd place, bronze medalist(s) | Total |
| Beach athletics | 2 | 0 | 0 | 2 |
| Beach handball | 1 | 0 | 0 | 1 |
| Beach wrestling | 0 | 2 | 1 | 3 |
| Open water swimming | 0 | 2 | 2 | 4 |
| Dragon boat | 0 | 1 | 2 | 3 |
| Total | 3 | 5 | 5 | 13 |

=== By date ===
Medals by date
| Date | 1st place, gold medalist(s) | 2nd place, silver medalist(s) | 3rd place, bronze medalist(s) | Total |
| 23 April | 0 | 0 | 0 | 0 |
| 24 April | 1 | 1 | 0 | 2 |
| 25 April | 1 | 0 | 2 | 3 |
| 26 April | 0 | 1 | 2 | 3 |
| 27 April | 0 | 1 | 0 | 1 |
| 28 April | 0 | 0 | 0 | 0 |
| 29 April | 0 | 2 | 1 | 3 |
| 30 April | 1 | 0 | 0 | 1 |
| Total | 3 | 5 | 5 | 13 |

== Beach athletics ==
Men

| Athlete | Event | Final | |
| Athlete | Event | Distance | Position |
|---|---|---|---|
| Phạm Văn Nghĩa | Long jump | 7.44 | 1st place, gold medalist(s) |

Women

| Athlete | Event | Final | |
| Athlete | Event | Distance | Position |
|---|---|---|---|
| Hà Thị Thúy Hằng | Long jump | 6.16 | 1st place, gold medalist(s) |
| Vũ Thị Ngọc Hà | Long jump | 5.81 | 4 |
| Bùi Thị Kim Anh | High jump | 1.60 | 9 |
| Dương Thị Thảo | High jump | 1.78 | 4 |

== Beach handball ==
| Event | Group Stage | | | | Semifinals | Final / BM | |
| Event | Opposition Score | Opposition Score | Opposition Score | Rank | Opposition Score | Opposition Score | Rank |
|---|---|---|---|---|---|---|---|
| Women's Team | Thailand; W 2–0 | Hong Kong; W 2–0 | Philippines; W 2–0 | 1 Q | Turkmenistan; W 2–0 | China; W 2–1 | 1st place, gold medalist(s) |

== Beach wrestling ==
Men

| Athlete | Event | Qualifiying | Group Stage | | | | Quarterfinals | Semifinals | Final / BM | |
| Athlete | Event | Opposition Score | Opposition Score | Opposition Score | Opposition Score | Rank | Opposition Score | Opposition Score | Opposition Score | Rank |
|---|---|---|---|---|---|---|---|---|---|---|
| Trần Văn Tòng | Men's 70kg | Bye | Adis (KGZ); L 1–2 | Abdullah (PAK); L 1–2 | Waqedi (YEM); W 2–0 | 3 | Did not advance | | | |
| Nguyễn Văn Hào | Men's 80kg | Bye | Heng (CAM); W 2–0 | Ullah (PAK); L 0–2 | Chunara (NEP); W 3–1 | 2 Q | Koshkinbayev (KAZ); L 1–2 | Did not advance | | |
| Ngô Văn Lâm | Men's 90kg | Bye | Chow (SGP); W 2–1 | Kavousi (IRI); L 0–2 | Sharipov (BRN); L 0–1 | 3 | Did not advance | | | |

Women

| Athlete | Event | Qualifiying | Group Stage | | | | Semifinals | Final / BM | |
| Athlete | Event | Opposition Score | Opposition Score | Opposition Score | Opposition Score | Rank | Opposition Score | Opposition Score | Rank |
|---|---|---|---|---|---|---|---|---|---|
| Đoàn Thị Kim Oanh | Women's 50kg | —N/a | Cheon (KOR); W 2–0 | Ryskulova (KGZ); W 1–0 | Gavalez (PHI); W 1–0 | 1 Q | Prajapat (IND); W 2–0 | Pedige (SRI); L 1–2 | 2nd place, silver medalist(s) |
| Nguyễn Thị Mỹ Hạnh | Women's 60kg | Bye | Balisme (PHI); W 2–0 | Kwon (KOR); W 2–0 | Sreylen (CAM); W 4–0 | 1 Q | Xie (CHN); L 1–2 | Kwon (KOR); W 2–0 | 3rd place, bronze medalist(s) |
| Đặng Thị Linh | Women's 70kg | Bye | Abukheit (JOR); W 1–0 | Long (CHN); L 0–1 | Sharshebaeva (KGZ); W 4–0 | 2 Q | Jaspreet (IND); W 4–0 | Long (CHN); L 0–4 | 2nd place, silver medalist(s) |
| Phạm Thị Huyền Trang | Women's +70kg | Alina (KAZ); L 1–5 | Did not advance | | | | | | |

== Dragon boat ==
Women

| Athlete | Event | Heat | | Semifinal | | Final | |
| Athlete | Event | Time | Rank | Time | Rank | Time | Rank |
|---|---|---|---|---|---|---|---|
| Hồ Thị Nè; Diệp Thị Thuý; Vũ Thị Ngọc Uyên; Lê Thị Phương Minh; Lý Thị Thuý; Phùng Thị Ngọc Diễm; Lê Thị Lan Anh; Nguyễn Thị Lợi; Mạc Thị Thanh Thúy; Mạc Thị Thương; Bùi Thị Yến; Ma Thị Thuý; Nguyễn Thị Tâm; Nguyễn Thị Hải Anh | 100 m | 27.988 | 2 SF | 29.897 | 2 GF | 28.516 | 2nd place, silver medalist(s) |
| Hồ Thị Nè; Diệp Thị Thuý; Vũ Thị Ngọc Uyên; Lê Thị Phương Minh; Lý Thị Thuý; Phùng Thị Ngọc Diễm; Lê Thị Lan Anh; Nguyễn Thị Lợi; Mạc Thị Thanh Thúy; Mạc Thị Thương; Bùi Thị Yến; Ma Thị Thuý; Nguyễn Thị Tâm; Nguyễn Thị Hải Anh | 200 m | 52.394 | 1 GF | Bye | | 54.839 | 3rd place, bronze medalist(s) |
| Hồ Thị Nè; Diệp Thị Thuý; Vũ Thị Ngọc Uyên; Lê Thị Phương Minh; Lý Thị Thuý; Phùng Thị Ngọc Diễm; Lê Thị Lan Anh; Nguyễn Thị Lợi; Mạc Thị Thanh Thúy; Mạc Thị Thương; Bùi Thị Yến; Ma Thị Thuý; Nguyễn Thị Tâm; Nguyễn Thị Hải Anh | 400 m | 1:52.998 | 2 SF | 1:54.295 | 1 GF | 1:53.098 | 3rd place, bronze medalist(s) |

== Ju-jitsu ==
Men

| Athlete | Event | Round of 32 | Round of 16 | Quarterfinals | Semifinals | Finals | |
| Athlete | Event | Opposition Result | Opposition Result | Opposition Result | Opposition Result | Opposition | Final Ranking |
|---|---|---|---|---|---|---|---|
| Cấn Văn Thắng | Newaza −62 kg | Khabibulla (KAZ); L 0-50 | Did not advance | | | | |
| Đặng Đình Tùng | Newaza −69 kg | Abdymanapov (KGZ); L 0-2 | Did not advance | | | | |
| Nguyễn Tất Lộc | Newaza −77 kg | Bulgankhuu (MGL); L 0-2 | Did not advance | | | | |

Women

| Athlete | Event | Round of 32 | Round of 16 | Quarterfinals | Semifinals | Finals | |
| Athlete | Event | Opposition Result | Opposition Result | Opposition Result | Opposition Result | Opposition | Final Ranking |
|---|---|---|---|---|---|---|---|
| Trần Thị Thanh Hà | Newaza -52 kg | Yue (CHN); L 0-50 | Did not advance | | | | |
| Trịnh Thị Thảo Trinh | Newaza -57 kg | Thomas (PHI); L 0-50 | Did not advance | | | | |
| Nguyễn Thị Minh Vương | Newaza -57 kg | Bye | Yujin (KOR); L 0-2 | Did not advance | | | |
| Ngô Thị Thảo Vân | Newaza -63 kg | Park (KOR); W 4-0 | Alkalbani (UAE); L 0-50 | Did not advance | | | |

== Open water swimming ==
| Athlete | Event | Final | |
| Athlete | Event | Time | Rank |
|---|---|---|---|
| Nguyễn Huy Hoàng | Men's 5 km | 53:53.2 | 2nd place, silver medalist(s) |
| Mai Trần Tuấn Anh | Men's 5 km | 53:56.3 | 3rd place, bronze medalist(s) |
| Võ Thị Mỹ Tiên | Women's 5 km | 1:01:57.7 | 3rd place, bronze medalist(s) |
| Nguyễn Huy Hoàng; Mai Trần Tuấn Anh; Võ Thị Mỹ Tiên; Nguyễn Khả Nhi | Team rely | 1:06:32.4 | 2nd place, silver medalist(s) |

== Sailing ==
Men

| Athlete | Event | Race | | | | | | | | | Net Points | Total Points | Rank |
| Athlete | Event | 1 | 2 | 3 | 4 | 5 | 6 | 7 | 8 | 9 | Net Points | Total Points | Rank |
|---|---|---|---|---|---|---|---|---|---|---|---|---|---|
| Mai Thanh Nhật | ILCA4 | 20 | 24 | 14 | 21 | 11 | 18 | 14 | 22 | 22 | 166 | 142 | 20 |

== Teqball ==
| Team | Event | Group stage | | | | | Quarterfinals | Semifinals | Final / BM | |
| Team | Event | Opposition Score | Opposition Score | Opposition Score | Opposition Score | Rank | Opposition Score | Opposition Score | Opposition Score | Rank |
|---|---|---|---|---|---|---|---|---|---|---|
| Bá Trường Giang; Lê Anh Khoa | Men's Doubles | Zhixu / Zhang (CHN); L 0–2 | Abdullah / Danish (MAS); W 2–0 | —N/a | | 2 Q | Hafez / Arabi (LBN); L 0–2 | Did not advance | | |
| Nguyễn Thị Thu Hoài; Trịnh Gia Nghi | Women's Doubles | Alfailakawi / Almansour (KUW); W 2–0 | Sreymeas / Sophornraksmey (CAM); L 1–2 | Chaleunsouk / Phommyvong (LAO); W 2–0 | Homdee / Kuntatong (THA); L 0–2 | 3 | —N/a | Did not advance | | |
| Nguyễn Hoàng Minh Tân; Trịnh Gia Nghi | Mixed Doubles | Jalil / Shakir (IRQ); W 2–1 | Phonexay / Alisa (LAO); W 2–1 | —N/a | | 1 Q | Kim / Han (PRK); L 0–2 | Did not advance | | |
