= Malaysia at the 2026 Asian Beach Games =

- IOC code: MAS
- NOC: Olympic Council of Malaysia
- Website: olympics.com.my (in English)

in Sanya, China 22–30 April 2026
- Competitors: 33 in 6 sports
- Flag bearers: Isaac Tan Zhen Wei; Lydia Hannah Jasmine Lukman
- Medals Ranked =26th: Gold 0 Silver 0 Bronze 1 Total 1

Asian Beach Games appearances
- 2008; 2010; 2012; 2014; 2016; 2026

Malaysia competed in the 2026 Asian Beach Games in Sanya, Hainan, China from 22 to 30 April 2026. This marks the return of the Asian Beach Games, ten years since the 2016 edition in Da Nang, Vietnam. The delegation have 33 athletes in 6 sports.

== Competitors ==
The following is the list of the number of competitors participating at the Games per sport/discipline.

Sport	Men	Women	Total
3x3 basketball	4	4	8
Aquathlon	3	2	5
Beach volleyball	2	2	4
Open water swimming	2	1	3
Sailing	6	5	11
Teqball	2	0	2
Total	19	14	33

== Medalists ==
Medal	Name	Sport	Event	Date
Bronze	Muhammad Yaasin Bin Syahrizan	Sailing	Men's Optimist	28 April

== 3x3 basketball ==
Event	Group Stage				Quarterfinals	Semifinals	Final	
Event	Opposition Score	Opposition Score	Opposition Score	Rank	Opposition Score	Opposition Score	Opposition Score	Rank
Men's team	Sri Lanka; W 21–12	Mongolia; W 19–12	Indonesia; W 22–11	1 Q	China; L 15–22	Did not advance		
Women's team	Mongolia; W 21–12	Saudi Arabia; W Withdrew	Chinese Taipei; W 16–14	1 Q	Singapore; L 7–15	Did not advance		

== Aquathlon ==
3 male and 2 female athletes represented Malaysia in the sport.

Athlete	Event	Result	
Athlete	Event	Time	Rank
Isaac Tan Zhen Wei	Men's individual	31:41	9
Yap Qi Yi	Men's individual	31:42	10
Esther Joy Chen Hong Li	Women's individual	34:52	12
Cindy Sui Yea Zhen	Women's individual	35:49	16
Benjamin John Chen Hong Ren; Isaac Tan Zhen Wei; Esther Joy Chen Hong Li; Cindy Sui Yea Zhen	Mixed relay	1:07:48	7

== Beach volleyball ==
Athlete	Event	Preliminary round					Round of 16	Quarterfinals	Semifinal	Final	
Athlete	Event	Opposition Score	Opposition Score	Opposition Score	Opposition Score	Rank	Opposition Score	Opposition Score	Opposition Score	Opposition Score	Rank
Isma Haziq Ismail; Tan Yong Jen	Men's	Nakprakhong / Taovato (THA); L 0–2	Bat-Enkh / Nymdagva (MGL); W 2–0	Mokhammad / Yakovlev (KAZ); L 0–2	Bae / Yeo (KOR); W 2–0	3	Did not advance				
Sin Sing Yee; Rachael Goh Yu Jie	Women's	Maguy / Luiza (SYR); W 2–0	Fathimath / Aminath (MDV); W 2–0	Ito / Ishii (JPN); L 0–2	—N/a	2 Q	Matsumoto / Matsumoto (JPN); L 0–2	Did not advance			

== Open water swimming ==
3 swimmers represented Malaysia in two events.

Athlete	Event	Result	
Athlete	Event	Time	Rank
Aslan Adnan	Men's 5 km	1:00:12.8	17
Bryston Lee Kai Cheng	Men's 5 km	OTL	
Magdaline Lau Ing Siew	Women's 5 km	OTL	

== Sailing ==
11 sailors from Malaysia qualified for the games.

Men

Athlete	Event	Race															Total	
Athlete	Event	1	2	3	4	5	6	7	8	9	10	11	12	13	14	15	Points	Rank
Khairul Ilzani Afendy	Optimist	11	9	16	4	~~(23)~~	11	4	7	5	6	—N/a					73	9
Yaasin Syahrizan	Optimist	10	10	3	2	9	6	~~(13)~~	2	1	4	—N/a					47	3rd place, bronze medalist(s)
Hilfi Nafael Hasrizan	ILCA4	10	5	~~(25)~~	8	9	9	12	17	5	X	—N/a					75	10
Aiman Aqeel Firdaus	ILCA4	15	1	~~(25)~~	2	25	6	7	4	4	X	—N/a					64	8
Hafizin Mansor	Foil windsurfing	~~(12)~~	~~(12)~~	12	6	5	9	9	8	8	7	9	6	12	X	X	91	10
Yusri Syahrizan	Foil windsurfing	~~(12)~~	~~(12)~~	12	12	7	11	11	11	11	10	6	12	12	X	X	115	11

Women

Athlete	Event	Race															Total	
Athlete	Event	1	2	3	4	5	6	7	8	9	10	11	12	13	14	15	Points	Rank
Lydia Hannah Lukman	Optimist	3	6	7	3	~~(13)~~	5	6	3	4	7	—N/a					44	6
Mia Azrania Azrald	Optimist	6	5	3	6	10	8	8	~~(15)~~	9	8	—N/a					63	7
Sara Amanda Azman	ILCA4	~~(11)~~	4	6	4	1	11	11	6	4	X	—N/a					47	6
Nur Hafizanah Zailan	ILCA4	7	5	9	1	~~(21)~~	8	2	3	9	X	—N/a					44	5
Marcella Villaceran	Foil windsurfing	~~(11)~~	~~(11)~~	5	3	11	11	9	10	9	10	8	11	X	X	X	87	9

== Teqball ==
2 athletes represented Malaysia in men's doubles event.

Athletes	Event	Group Stage			Quarterfinals	Semifinals	Final	
Athletes	Event	Opposition Score	Opposition Score	Rank	Opposition Score	Opposition Score	Opposition Score	Rank
Rahmat Abdullah; Amirul Danish	Men's doubles	Sun / Zhang (CHN); L 0–2	Bá / Lê (VIE); L 0–2	3	Did not advance			
