= Qatar at the 2026 Asian Beach Games =

- IOC code: QAT
- NOC: Qatar Olympic Committee
- Website: www.olympic.qa

in Sanya, China 22–30 April 2026
- Competitors: 33 in 7 sports
- Flag bearers: Shaheen Al-Kaabi; Haya Abu-Issa
- Medals Ranked 8th: Gold 2 Silver 1 Bronze 0 Total 3

Asian Beach Games appearances
- 2008; 2010; 2012; 2014; 2016; 2026

Qatar competed at the 2026 Asian Beach Games in Sanya, China from 22 to 30 April 2026. This marks the return of the Asian Beach Games, ten years since the 2016 edition in Da Nang, Vietnam.

At the opening ceremony, aquathlon athlete Shaheen Al-Kaabi and beach volleyball player Haya Abu-Issa were the flagbearers for Qatar.

Qatar finished with two golds and one silver medal. The pairing of Cherif Younousse and Ahmed Tijan won the men's beach volleyball event and the Qatar national team won the men'st 3x3 basketball tournament. The Qatar men's national beach handball team also finished as silver medalists.

== Medalists ==
=== Gold ===
No.	Medal	Name	Sport	Event	Date
1	Gold	Cherif Younousse; Ahmed Tijan	Beach volleyball	Men's doubles	29 Apr
2	Gold	Mohammed Abbasher; Ousmanediatta Dieng; Dejan Janjić; Abdulrahman Saad	3x3 basketball	Men's team	29 Apr

=== Silver ===
No.	Medal	Name	Sport	Event	Date
1	(silver) Silver	Žarko Marković; Mutasem Mohamed; Abdulrazzaq Murad; Rasheed Yusuff; Amir Denguir; Abdelhady Elnamr; Hani Kakhi; Anis Zouaoui; Hamdi Ayed; Ahmed Elmeniawy	Beach handball	Men's team	29 Apr

== Competitors ==
The following is the list of the number of competitors participating at the Games per sport/discipline.

Sport	Men	Women	Total
Aquathlon	1	0	1
3x3 basketball	4	4	8
Beach handball	10	0	10
Beach volleyball	4	4	8
Beach wrestling	2	0	2
Ju-jitsu	2	0	2
Sailing	2	0	2
Total	25	8	33

== 3x3 basketball ==
Summary

Event	Group Stage				Qualifiers	Quarterfinals	Semifinals	Final / BM	
Event	Opposition Score	Opposition Score	Opposition Score	Rank	Opposition Score	Opposition Score	Opposition Score	Opposition Score	Rank
Men's team	Bahrain; W 21–11	Kazakhstan; W 22–15	India; W 15–12	1 Q	Bye	Iran; W 20–16	China; W 18–16	Thailand; W 21–10	1st place, gold medalist(s)
Women's team	China; L 5–21	Kazakhstan; L 7–21	—N/a	3 q	Singapore; W 1–21	Did not advance			

=== Men's tournament ===
Team roster

- Mohammed Abbasher
- Ousmanediatta Dieng
- Dejan Janjić
- Abdulrahman Saad

Preliminary rounds – Group C

Pos	Team	Pld	W	L	PF	PA	PD
1	Qatar	3	3	0	57	38	+19
2	India	3	2	1	51	37	+14
3	Bahrain	3	1	2	44	55	−11
4	Kazakhstan	3	0	3	39	61	−22

Source: FIBA

25 April
17:10

Report

Qatar	21–11	Bahrain
Pts: Janjić, Abbasher 7		Pts: Ajukwa 6

Sports Centre Gymnasium, Sanya
Referees: Kim (KOR), Nagoshi (JPN)

25 April
18:50

Report

Kazakhstan	15–22	Qatar
Pts: Tangiyev 6		Pts: Janjić 11

Sports Centre Gymnasium, Sanya
Referees: Kim (KOR), Chen (TPE)

27 April
13:05

Report

Qatar	15–12	India
Pts: Janjić, Saad 7		Pts: Dagar 6

Sports Centre Gymnasium, Sanya
Referees: Leong (SGP), Cong (CHN)

Quarterfinals

28 April
18:50

Report

Qatar	20–16	Iran
Pts: Saad 10		Pts: Grigorian 8

Sports Centre Gymnasium, Sanya
Referees: Quinn (INA), Nagoshi (JPN)

Semifinals

29 April
15:15

Report

Qatar	18–16	China
Pts: Dieng 7		Pts: Qi 6

Sports Centre Gymnasium, Sanya
Referees: Quinn (INA), Nagoshi (JPN)

Gold medal match

29 April
19:30

Report

Thailand	10–21	Qatar
Pts: Franco 4		Pts: Janjić 12

Sports Centre Gymnasium, Sanya
Referees: Cong (CHN), Quinn (INA)

=== Women's tournament ===
Team roster

- Sama Gasir
- Mona Elsayed
- Alaa Soliman
- Tania Taweel

Preliminary rounds – Group A

Pos	Team	Pld	W	L	PF	PA	PD
1	China	2	2	0	42	13	+29
2	Kazakhstan	2	1	1	29	28	+1
3	Qatar	2	0	2	12	42	−30

Source: FIBA

25 April
12:15

Report

China	21–5	Qatar
Pts: Sun 7		Pts: El-Sayed 3

Sports Centre Gymnasium, Sanya
Referees: Nozaki (JPN), Laosaksam (THA)

27 April
11:00

Report

Kazakhstan	21–7	Qatar
Pts: Zhakipova 10		Pts: Gasir, El-Sayed, Taweel 2

Sports Centre Gymnasium, Sanya
Referees: Chan (HKG), Cong (CHN)

Play-ins

28 April
13:05

Report

Singapore	21–1	Qatar
Pts: Han 8		Pts: Soliman 1

Sports Centre Gymnasium, Sanya
Referees: Chan (HKG), Cong (CHN)

== Beach handball ==
Summary

Event	Group Stage								Semifinals	Final / BM	
Event	Opposition Score	Opposition Score	Opposition Score	Opposition Score	Opposition Score	Opposition Score	Opposition Score	Rank	Opposition Score	Opposition Score	Rank
Men's team	Pakistan; W 2–0	Oman; W 2–0	Bangladesh; W 2–0	Mongolia; W 2–0	Jordan; W 2–0	Thailand; W 2–0	Maldives; W 2–0	1Q	Bahrain; W 2–0	Iran; L 1–2	2nd place, silver medalist(s)

== Beach volleyball ==
Athletes	Event	Preliminary round				Round of 16	Quarterfinals	Semifinals	Finals	Rank
Athletes	Event	Opposition Score	Opposition Score	Opposition Score	Rank	Opposition Score	Opposition Score	Opposition Score	Opposition Score	Rank
Cherif Samba; Ahmed Janko	Men's tournament	Naseem / Ismail (MDV); W (21–16, 21–10)	Dauilbaev / Tolibaev (UZB); W (21–14, 21–9)	Khakizadeh / Ghalehnovi (IRI); W (21–11, 21–23, 15–10)	1Q	Zainelabedin / Mou (QAT); W (21–10, 21–16)	Zhang / Zhou (CHN); W (21–10, 21–19)	Muadpha / Muneekul (THA); W (21–12, 21–14)	Khakizadeh / Ghalehnovi (IRI); W (21–15, 21–12)	1st place, gold medalist(s)
Mohamed Zainelabedin; Musa Mou	Men's tournament	Mahfouz / Aljorfi (KSA); W (21–17, 21–15)	Tam / Tai (MAC); W (21–10, 21–5)	Wang / Wu (CHN); L (19–21, 17–21)	2Q	Samba / Janko (QAT); L (10–21, 16–21)	Did not advance			
