= Open water swimming at the 2026 Asian Beach Games =

Open water swimming competition at the 2026 Asian Beach Games

- Venue: Haiyue Square Beach
- Dates: 25–27 April 2026

Open water swimming competition at the 2026 Asian Beach Games was held Sanya, Hainan, China from 25 to 27 April 2026 at the seaside pier of the Haiyue Square, Sanya Bay, Tianya District.

== Medalists ==
Event	Gold	Silver	Bronze
Men's 5 km	Zhang Ziyang; China	Nguyễn Huy Hoàng; Vietnam	Mai Trần Tuấn Anh; Vietnam
Women's 5 km	Li Xinxuan; China	Chen Yijing; China	Võ Thị Mỹ Tiên; Vietnam
Mixed 4 × 1.5 km relay	China; Li Xinxuan; Chen Yijing; Liu Peixin; Zhang Ziyang	Vietnam; Nguyễn Huy Hoàng; Võ Thị Mỹ Tiên; Nguyễn Khả Nhi; Mai Trần Tuấn Anh	South Korea; Yoon Jun-sang; Lee Hae-rim; Kim Sue-ah; Oh Se-beom

== Medal table ==
Rank	Nation	Gold	Silver	Bronze	Total
1	China (CHN)	3	1	0	4
2	Vietnam (VIE)	0	2	2	4
3	South Korea (KOR)	0	0	1	1
Totals (3 entries)		3	3	3	9

== Results ==
=== Men's 5 km ===
26 April

Rank	Athlete	Time
1st place, gold medalist(s)	Zhang Ziyang (CHN)	53:46.0
2nd place, silver medalist(s)	Nguyễn Huy Hoàng (VIE)	53:53.2
3rd place, bronze medalist(s)	Mai Trần Tuấn Anh (VIE)	53:56.3
4	Robert Bonsall (BRN)	54:19.2
5	Oh Se-beom (KOR)	54:44.8
6	Liu Peixin (CHN)	55:41.6
7	Cho Cheng-chi (TPE)	55:51.6
8	Lev Cherepanov (KAZ)	56:00.0
9	Khomchan Wichachai (THA)	57:16.1
10	Yoon Jun-sang (KOR)	57:35.9
11	Keith Sin (HKG)	58:06.9
12	Su Bo-ling (TPE)	58:56.1
13	Galymzhan Balabek (KAZ)	59:49.4
14	Dilanka Shehan (SRI)	59:51.0
15	Kittinun Chothistayanggoon (THA)	59:51.5
16	Daniel Nasredinov (KGZ)	1:00:11.4
17	Aslan Adnan (MAS)	1:00:12.8
18	Nikita Kornilov (UZB)	1:00:33.4
19	Osama Trabulsi (SYR)	1:01:28.4
20	Amir Kydyrmaev (KGZ)	1:01:59.4
21	William Balzano (BRN)	1:02:03.0
22	Kenan Al-Gharib (SYR)	1:02:05.9
23	Faisal Ahmmed (BAN)	1:03:27.8
—	Mohamed Al-Yammahi (UAE)	OTL
—	Bryston Lee (MAS)	OTL
—	Ahmed Al-Blooshi (UAE)	OTL
—	Shaym Hussain Ibrahim (MDV)	OTL
—	Daniyal Ameen Faisal (MDV)	OTL

=== Women's 5 km ===
25 April

Rank	Athlete	Time
1st place, gold medalist(s)	Li Xinxuan (CHN)	1:01:33.6
2nd place, silver medalist(s)	Chen Yijing (CHN)	1:01:43.2
3rd place, bronze medalist(s)	Võ Thị Mỹ Tiên (VIE)	1:01:57.7
4	Nikita Lam (HKG)	1:02:32.2
5	Nip Tsz Yin (HKG)	1:04:13.9
6	Mariya Fedotova (KAZ)	1:04:15.4
7	Lin Jia-shien (TPE)	1:05:14.3
8	Elisabeth Yim Calmels (THA)	1:05:28.1
9	Lee Hae-rim (KOR)	1:05:42.8
10	Darya Pushko (KAZ)	1:06:43.9
11	Liu Pin-cen (TPE)	1:08:20.9
12	Kim Sue-ah (KOR)	1:10:48.3
13	Anastasiya Zelinskaya (UZB)	1:10:58.4
—	Magdalene Lau (SGP)	OTL
—	Ayaana Areef (MDV)	OTL
—	Fathimath Anjal Fayaz (MDV)	OTL
—	Thitirat Charoensup (THA)	DNF

=== Mixed 4 × 1.5 km relay ===
27 April

Rank	Team	Time
1st place, gold medalist(s)	China	1:05:26.8
2nd place, silver medalist(s)	Vietnam	1:06:32.4
3rd place, bronze medalist(s)	South Korea	1:08:15.0
4	Kazakhstan	1:08:22.9
5	Chinese Taipei	1:08:23.2
6	Thailand	1:09:57.6
—	Maldives	OTL
