= Sailing at the 2026 Asian Beach Games =

Sporing competition

- Venue: Haihong Square
- Dates: 23–28 April 2026

Sailing competition at the 2026 Asian Beach Games was held at Haihong Square, Sanya Bay in Sanya, China from 23 to 28 April 2026. A total of 116 sailors from 16 nations competed in the competition.

The competition had eight events, Formula Kite (no age restriction), Foil Windsurfing (born in or ofter 2006), Optimist (born in or after 2011) and ILCA 4 (born in or after 2009) for both men and women.

== Medalists ==
=== Men ===
Event	Gold	Silver	Bronze
Formula Kite	Joseph Weston; Thailand	Xue Shiming; China	Yang Xinnuo; China
iQFoil Youth	Wang Yiguo; China	Dhenver Castillo; Philippines	Wachirawit Thonup; Thailand
ILCA 4	Ian Goh; Singapore	Hussaluk Srinakorn; Thailand	Choi Ji-un; South Korea
Optimist	Rachata Sadtrakulwattana; Thailand	Sorawit Naksuk; Thailand	Yaasin Syahrizan; Malaysia

=== Women ===
Event	Gold	Silver	Bronze
Formula Kite	Ma Zilin; China	Li Shuxuan; China	Lee Young-eun; South Korea
iQFoil Youth	Chen Yimin; China	Yuen Ching Suet; Hong Kong	Li Qing; China
ILCA 4	Yan Guoguo; China	Pailin Jaroenpon; Thailand	Nia Mehry Zahedi; Singapore
Optimist	Cheng Wenyu; China	Anya Alessia Zahedi; Singapore	Pariyaporn Chantarawong; Thailand

== Medal table ==
Rank	Nation	Gold	Silver	Bronze	Total
1	China (CHN)	5	2	2	9
2	Thailand (THA)	2	3	2	7
3	Singapore (SGP)	1	1	1	3
4	Hong Kong (HKG)	0	1	0	1
4	Philippines (PHI)	0	1	0	1
6	South Korea (KOR)	0	0	2	2
7	Malaysia (MAS)	0	0	1	1
Totals (7 entries)		8	8	8	24

== Results ==
=== Men ===
==== Formula Kite ====
23–28 April

Rank	Athlete	Race															Total
Rank	Athlete	1	2	3	4	5	6	7	8	9	10	11	12	13	14	15	Total
1st place, gold medalist(s)	Joseph Weston (THA)	1	1	2	1	1	2	~~(3)~~	1	2	3	2	~~(4)~~	2	3	1	22
2nd place, silver medalist(s)	Xue Shiming (CHN)	2	~~(10)~~	3	2	2	~~(10)~~	1	2	1	1	10	2	1	2	2	31
3rd place, bronze medalist(s)	Yang Xinnuo (CHN)	~~(10)~~	~~(10)~~	1	10	3	1	2	3	3	2	1	3	3	1	3	36
4	Chitresh Tatha (IND)	4	2	4	3	6	4	6	4	4	5	~~(7)~~	5	5	~~(7)~~	4	56
5	Sagdipat Thongjan (THA)	~~(10)~~	~~(10)~~	6	7	4	3	4	10	5	4	3	1	4	4	10	65
6	Warner Janoya (PHI)	~~(10)~~	4	5	4	5	7	5	6	7	6	6	8	8	5	~~(10)~~	76
7	Rey Sastre (PHI)	3	5	7	6	7	5	~~(8)~~	5	~~(8)~~	8	5	7	6	8	5	77
8	Lim Sung-jun (KOR)	~~(10)~~	3	8	5	~~(10)~~	6	7	10	6	7	4	6	7	6	10	85
9	Cho Su-cheol (KOR)	~~(10)~~	~~(10)~~	10	10	10	10	10	10	10	10	10	10	10	10	10	130

==== iQFoil Youth ====
23–28 April

Rank	Athlete	Race															Total
Rank	Athlete	1	2	3	4	5	6	7	8	9	10	11	12	13	14	15	Total
1st place, gold medalist(s)	Wang Yiguo (CHN)	~~(2)~~	1	1	1	1	1	1	~~(2)~~	2	1	1	1	1	X	X	12
2nd place, silver medalist(s)	Dhenver Castillo (PHI)	3	2	~~(12)~~	~~(7)~~	2	5	7	6	3	3	2	4	2	X	X	39
3rd place, bronze medalist(s)	Wachirawit Thonup (THA)	4	~~(12)~~	3	5	3	~~(6)~~	3	4	5	4	3	2	3	X	X	39
4	Yoo Jae-min (KOR)	1	3	~~(12)~~	9	6	7	6	5	4	9	5	3	~~(12)~~	X	X	58
5	Lu Xibin (CHN)	~~(12)~~	~~(12)~~	12	3	12	8	2	1	1	2	4	8	12	X	X	65
6	Curtis Ho (HKG)	~~(12)~~	5	~~(12)~~	2	12	2	5	3	10	11	12	5	4	X	X	71
7	Vinay Kulabkar (IND)	~~(12)~~	7	2	10	4	4	10	10	9	8	~~(12)~~	7	5	X	X	76
8	Ratcharnon Khunjeng (THA)	~~(12)~~	4	~~(12)~~	5	12	4	4	7	6	5	7	12	12	X	X	78
9	Lee Ji-han (KOR)	~~(12)~~	6	~~(12)~~	8	12	10	8	9	7	6	8	9	6	X	X	89
10	Hafizin Mansor (MAS)	~~(12)~~	~~(12)~~	12	6	5	9	9	8	8	7	9	6	12	X	X	91
11	Yusri Syahrizan (MAS)	~~(12)~~	~~(12)~~	12	12	7	11	11	11	11	10	6	12	12	X	X	115

==== ILCA 4 ====
23–28 April

Rank	Athlete	Race										Total
Rank	Athlete	1	2	3	4	5	6	7	8	9	10	Total
1st place, gold medalist(s)	Ian Goh (SGP)	5	6	7	3	2	5	2	5	~~(10)~~	X	35
2nd place, silver medalist(s)	Hussaluk Srinakorn (THA)	2	~~(14)~~	2	5	6	1	6	9	8	X	39
3rd place, bronze medalist(s)	Choi Ji-un (KOR)	3	~~(13)~~	8	10	1	2	1	13	2	X	40
4	Abdulla Al-Zubaidi (UAE)	1	7	3	1	~~(25)~~	13	15	1	1	X	42
5	Fu Fengziyi (CHN)	8	2	1	7	~~(18)~~	3	3	12	12	X	48
6	Chen Yu-kai (TPE)	9	3	4	9	8	4	~~(13)~~	3	11	X	51
7	Pacharapol Rumvisai (THA)	4	4	6	4	~~(25)~~	14	11	8	9	X	60
8	Aiman Aqeel Firdaus (MAS)	15	1	~~(25)~~	2	25	6	7	4	4	X	64
9	Ian Carl Cariño (PHI)	~~(25)~~	12	9	13	5	8	17	2	3	X	69
10	Hamka Naufal Hasrizan (MAS)	10	5	~~(25)~~	8	9	9	12	17	5	X	75
11	Vasu Chandrawanshi (IND)	16	9	17	15	4	7	5	11	~~(19)~~	X	84
12	Austin Yeo (SGP)	13	~~(15)~~	10	14	7	10	8	14	14	X	90
13	Yeh Teng-hsi (TPE)	6	~~(18)~~	12	12	12	11	9	15	18	X	95
14	Zhuang Jiahao (CHN)	11	10	5	25	3	16	4	25	~~(17)~~	X	99
15	Hamad Al-Masoud (KUW)	14	11	~~(25)~~	6	10	25	24	7	6	X	103
16	Zildjan Martin Samson (PHI)	7	8	13	19	~~(25)~~	19	10	21	7	X	104
17	Thani Shams (QAT)	12	20	19	11	16	~~(22)~~	20	6	13	X	117
18	Ilya Ivanov (KAZ)	21	16	18	17	15	15	18	~~(23)~~	16	X	136
19	Kim Seon-il (KOR)	20	~~(23)~~	16	18	14	21	16	19	15	X	139
20	Mai Thanh Nhật (VIE)	20	~~(24)~~	14	21	11	18	14	22	22	X	142
21	Ali Enki (KUW)	17	17	11	20	~~(25)~~	20	22	18	21	X	146
22	Amir Kanatbekov (KGZ)	22	19	~~(25)~~	16	13	12	21	19	25	X	147
23	Binal Perera (SRI)	~~(23)~~	22	15	22	19	23	23	10	20	X	154
24	Zhandaulet Omirzak (KAZ)	18	21	20	~~(23)~~	17	17	19	20	23	X	155

==== Optimist ====
23–28 April

Rank	Athlete	Race										Total
Rank	Athlete	1	2	3	4	5	6	7	8	9	10	Total
1st place, gold medalist(s)	Rachata Sadtrakulwattana (THA)	4	2	5	1	1	5	8	6	~~(10)~~	2	34
2nd place, silver medalist(s)	Sorawit Naksuk (THA)	9	1	4	6	3	10	2	3	2	~~(23)~~	40
3rd place, bronze medalist(s)	Yaasin Syahrizan (MAS)	10	10	3	2	9	6	~~(13)~~	2	1	4	47
4	Ethan Lee (SGP)	3	5	2	~~(23)~~	8	2	6	11	7	3	47
5	Choi Jong-hyeon (KOR)	2	3	6	~~(23)~~	4	9	1	1	23	5	54
6	Lucas Cao (SGP)	6	6	8	7	~~(23)~~	3	3	4	9	8	54
7	Wang Yaxuan (CHN)	8	4	1	~~(23)~~	7	13	7	8	12	1	61
8	Xu Youjia (CHN)	5	8	14	3	~~(23)~~	1	9	10	4	10	64
9	Khairul Ilzani Afendy (MAS)	11	9	16	4	~~(23)~~	11	4	7	5	6	73
10	Haren Wickramatillake (SRI)	~~(15)~~	12	9	5	2	4	12	9	14	9	76
11	Khalifa Al-Romaithi (UAE)	1	7	7	~~(23)~~	13	12	10	5	13	12	80
12	Krishna Venkitachalam (IND)	13	11	10	~~(23)~~	5	7	11	14	4	17	92
13	Carlstein Jade Dulay (PHI)	7	15	13	~~(23)~~	6	14	14	12	6	13	100
14	Kevin Millanas (PHI)	~~(23)~~	14	15	23	23	8	5	23	8	7	126
15	Choi Un-ho (KOR)	16	17	11	~~(23)~~	10	18	16	15	11	16	130
16	Tameem Shams (QAT)	14	13	12	~~(23)~~	14	15	17	17	16	15	133
17	Hamad Al-Mheiri (UAE)	12	~~(23)~~	18	23	11	19	18	14	15	11	141
18	Artem Litvinov (KGZ)	18	18	19	8	12	~~(20)~~	19	20	17	14	145
19	Zakareya Bohamad (KUW)	17	19	17	~~(23)~~	23	16	15	18	18	18	161
20	Zhengiskhan Kassym (KAZ)	20	16	20	~~(23)~~	23	17	20	19	19	19	173
21	Abdulaziz Al-Mansour (KUW)	19	21	22	~~(23)~~	23	22	21	16	23	21	188
22	Islam Dzhangirov (KGZ)	21	20	21	~~(23)~~	23	21	22	21	23	20	192

=== Women ===
==== Formula Kite ====
23–28 April

Rank	Athlete	Race															Total
Rank	Athlete	1	2	3	4	5	6	7	8	9	10	11	12	13	14	15	Total
1st place, gold medalist(s)	Ma Zilin (CHN)	~~(2)~~	1	1	1	1	1	~~2~~	1	2	1	1	1	2	2	X	15
2nd place, silver medalist(s)	Li Shuxuan (CHN)	1	~~(2)~~	~~(2)~~	2	2	2	1	2	1	2	2	2	1	1	X	19
3rd place, bronze medalist(s)	Lee Young-eun (KOR)	3	~~(7)~~	3	3	3	~~(4)~~	3	3	4	4	4	4	4	3	X	41
4	Benyapa Jantawan (THA)	~~(7)~~	~~(7)~~	4	7	4	3	7	4	3	3	3	3	3	7	X	51
5	Cyril Dacudao (PHI)	~~(7)~~	~~(7)~~	7	4	5	6	7	5	6	6	6	6	6	7	X	71
6	Sipang Juntrangkul (THA)	~~(7)~~	~~(7)~~	7	7	7	5	7	6	5	5	5	5	5	7	X	71

==== iQFoil Youth ====
23–28 April

Rank	Athlete	Race															Total
Rank	Athlete	1	2	3	4	5	6	7	8	9	10	11	12	13	14	15	Total
1st place, gold medalist(s)	Chen Yimin (CHN)	1	2	1	~~(11)~~	2	~~(4)~~	1	1	4	2	3	1	X	X	X	18
2nd place, silver medalist(s)	Yuen Ching Suet (HKG)	~~(3)~~	1	2	1	3	2	2	3	1	~~(7)~~	1	2	X	X	X	18
3rd place, bronze medalist(s)	Li Qing (CHN)	2	5	~~(11)~~	2	1	1	3	2	2	1	5	~~(11)~~	X	X	X	24
4	Wong Tsz Ying (HKG)	6	3	3	~~(11)~~	5	3	4	5	~~(10)~~	3	2	5	X	X	X	39
5	Kelsy Loryn Moreno (PHI)	4	4	~~(11)~~	4	4	5	8	~~(9)~~	7	4	4	4	X	X	X	48
6	Baek Ga-yeon (KOR)	5	6	~~(11)~~	5	7	8	7	4	3	5	~~(11)~~	11	X	X	X	61
7	Alfionnah Gonzalez (PHI)	~~(11)~~	~~(11)~~	4	11	6	9	5	8	5	9	6	3	X	X	X	66
8	Chanatkan Charoensuk (THA)	~~(11)~~	~~(11)~~	6	11	8	5	6	6	6	6	11	11	X	X	X	77
9	Marcella Wilson Villaceran (MAS)	~~(11)~~	~~(11)~~	5	3	11	11	9	10	9	10	8	11	X	X	X	87
10	Wannida Winthachai (THA)	~~(11)~~	~~(11)~~	11	11	11	7	10	7	8	8	7	11	X	X	X	91

==== ILCA 4 ====
23–28 April

Rank	Athlete	Race										Total
Rank	Athlete	1	2	3	4	5	6	7	8	9	10	Total
1st place, gold medalist(s)	Yan Guoguo (CHN)	4	~~(7)~~	1	2	2	4	1	4	1	X	19
2nd place, silver medalist(s)	Pailin Jaroenpon (THA)	3	1	7	5	4	3	~~(8)~~	1	3	X	27
3rd place, bronze medalist(s)	Nia Mehry Zahedi (SGP)	6	2	5	6	~~(21)~~	2	10	5	2	X	38
4	Marwa Al-Hammadi (UAE)	5	6	2	~~(12)~~	6	5	4	2	10	X	40
5	Nur Hafizanah Zailan (MAS)	7	5	9	1	~~(21)~~	8	2	3	9	X	44
6	Sara Amanda Noor Azman (MAS)	~~(11)~~	4	6	4	1	11	11	6	4	X	47
7	Wang Yage (CHN)	9	~~(21)~~	3	9	7	1	3	11	7	X	50
8	Lee Song-ha (KOR)	1	3	12	~~(21)~~	8	6	6	7	11	X	54
9	Thanaporn Phokaew (THA)	2	9	8	3	5	7	~~(12)~~	10	21	X	65
10	Aastha Pandey (IND)	10	~~(21)~~	4	7	9	12	5	12	6	X	65
11	Lee Soo-min (KOR)	14	11	16	8	~~(21)~~	15	7	8	5	X	84
12	Gabi Oh (SGP)	12	13	13	~~(15)~~	3	9	9	14	12	X	85
13	Taissiya Ilina (KAZ)	8	10	14	14	11	13	~~(15)~~	9	8	X	87
14	Al-Yazia Al-Hammadi (UAE)	13	~~(14)~~	10	11	12	10	13	13	13	X	95
15	Rose Ann Marienau (PHI)	15	12	~~(17)~~	13	10	14	14	16	14	X	108
16	Laila Hazari (SRI)	~~(21)~~	8	15	10	13	17	16	15	15	X	109
17	Daria Abroskina (KGZ)	17	16	11	17	14	~~(21)~~	17	17	17	X	126
18	Kristina Malakhova (KAZ)	18	~~(21)~~	21	18	15	16	18	19	16	X	141
19	Sohanya de Mel (SRI)	19	15	~~(21)~~	16	21	21	21	18	18	X	149
20	Sarah Al-Ajmi (KUW)	~~(21)~~	17	18	19	16	21	19	20	19	X	149

==== Optimist ====
23–28 April

Rank	Athlete	Race										Total
Rank	Athlete	1	2	3	4	5	6	7	8	9	10	Total
1st place, gold medalist(s)	Cheng Wenyu (CHN)	~~(7)~~	1	1	1	1	1	1	1	2	1	10
2nd place, silver medalist(s)	Anya Alessia Zahedi (SGP)	1	3	2	5	~~(8)~~	3	3	5	1	2	25
3rd place, bronze medalist(s)	Pariyaporn Chantarawong (THA)	5	2	5	2	2	2	~~(9)~~	8	6	3	35
4	Ni Yijia (CHN)	4	4	4	~~(12)~~	3	7	2	2	5	4	35
5	Surapha Muangngam (THA)	2	~~(8)~~	8	4	6	4	4	4	3	5	40
6	Lydia Hannah Jasmine Lukman (MAS)	3	6	7	3	~~(13)~~	5	6	3	4	7	44
7	Mia Azrania Azrald (MAS)	6	5	3	6	10	8	8	~~(15)~~	9	8	63
8	Wai Zhi Tong (SGP)	8	9	~~(15)~~	9	7	6	5	6	8	9	67
9	Shringhari Roy (IND)	12	~~(13)~~	6	7	4	10	13	9	10	6	77
10	Park Da-ol (KOR)	9	7	10	8	11	9	7	10	7	~~(12)~~	78
11	Amanda Amadeo (PHI)	10	10	9	11	6	~~(15)~~	11	7	11	11	86
12	An Si-yeon (KOR)	11	11	11	~~(14)~~	12	11	10	11	13	10	100
13	Lee Sin-ping (TPE)	13	~~(14)~~	12	11	9	12	12	12	12	13	106
14	Alissa Ilina (KAZ)	14	12	13	13	14	13	~~(15)~~	13	14	14	120
