= Beach athletics at the 2026 Asian Beach Games =

Sporting competition

- Venue: Phoenix Island
- Date: 24–26 April 2026

Beach athletics competition at the 2026 Asian Beach Games was held at Phoenix Island in Sanya, China from 24 to 26 April 2026. A total of 135 athletes from 21 nations participated.

== Medalists ==
=== Men ===
Event	Gold		Silver		Bronze	
60 m	Puripol Boonson; Thailand	6.62	Huang Youchao; China	6.67	Liu Yang; China	6.74
4 × 60 m relay	China; Huang Youchao; Li Mengyuan; Wang Xinkai; Ailikuti Yishake	26.06	Thailand; Chutithat Pruksorranan; Natawat Iamudom; Soraoat Dapbang; Puripol Boonson	26.68	Sri Lanka; Pramuditha Silva; Sadun Diyalawaththa; Malith Tharushan; Malith Thamel	27.57
High jump	Leonard Grospe; Philippines	2.05	Yeh Po-ting; Chinese Taipei	2.05	Shared silver	
High jump	Leonard Grospe; Philippines	2.05	Zhang Hao; China	2.05	Shared silver	
Long jump	Phạm Văn Nghĩa; Vietnam	7.44	Tao Yege; China	7.41	Jayathra Sampath Miranda; Sri Lanka	7.37
Shot put	Hassan Ajami; Iran	20.17	Chen Chengyu; China	19.95	Zhang Haochen; China	19.69

=== Women ===
Event	Gold		Silver		Bronze	
60 m	Jirapat Khanonta; Thailand	7.46	Xu Jialu; China	7.49	Jessica Laurance; Philippines	7.52
4 × 60 m relay	Thailand; Manatsada Sanmano; Jirapat Khanonta; Athicha Phetkun; Supanich Poolkerd	29.46	Philippines; Kristina Knott; Shane Joy Ponce; Lianne Pama; Jessica Laurance	29.73	China; Li He; Zhou Jing; Dong Yuehua; Feng Lulu	30.42
High jump	Barnokhon Sayfullaeva; Uzbekistan	1.85	Hu Linpeng; China	1.83	Shared silver	
High jump	Barnokhon Sayfullaeva; Uzbekistan	1.85	Shao Yuqi; China	1.83	Shared silver	
Long jump	Hà Thị Thúy Hằng; Vietnam	6.16	Ishara Samanmali; Sri Lanka	5.87	Sashikala Lankathilaka; Sri Lanka	5.83
Shot put	Song Jiayuan; China	19.15	Zhang Linru; China	18.27	Wu Ci-en; Chinese Taipei	16.40

== Medal table ==
Rank	Nation	Gold	Silver	Bronze	Total
1	Thailand (THA)	3	1	0	4
2	China (CHN)	2	8	3	13
3	Vietnam (VIE)	2	0	0	2
4	Philippines (PHI)	1	1	1	3
5	Iran (IRI)	1	0	0	1
5	Uzbekistan (UZB)	1	0	0	1
7	Sri Lanka (SRI)	0	1	3	4
8	Chinese Taipei (TPE)	0	1	1	2
Totals (8 entries)		10	12	8	30

== Results ==
=== Men ===
==== 60 m ====
===== Round 1 =====
24 April

Rank	Athlete	Time
Heat 1
1	Liu Yang (CHN)	6.90
2	Sami Ullah (PAK)	7.09
3	Malith Tharushan (SRI)	7.11
4	Hassan Saaid (MDV)	7.12
5	Abobakr Salem Baghoot (YEM)	7.13
6	Pi Durden Wangkay (PHI)	7.14
7	Nikolai Kotliarov (KGZ)	7.62
8	Passang Dorji (BHU)	7.72
Heat 2
1	Huang Youchao (CHN)	6.75
2	Puripol Boonson (THA)	6.78
3	Chan Yat Lok (HKG)	6.83
4	Rashid Al-Aasmi (OMA)	6.89
5	Sulton Gafurjonov (UZB)	6.92
6	Wang Chiao-hung (TPE)	6.97
7	Mounzinho Amaral (TLS)	7.46
8	Moheeb Jalayta (PLE)	7.53
Heat 3
1	James Chan (HKG)	6.89
2	Malith Thamel (SRI)	6.96
3	Tseng Hung-shan (TPE)	6.97
4	Thawatchai Himaiad (THA)	7.01
5	Amir Reza Moeinpour (IRI)	7.07
6	Abdul Motalab (BAN)	7.21
7	Mohamed Obaid Al-Saadi (OMA)	7.24
8	Timur Isakov (KGZ)	7.42

===== Final =====
25 April

Rank	Athlete	Time
1st place, gold medalist(s)	Puripol Boonson (THA)	6.62
2nd place, silver medalist(s)	Huang Youchao (CHN)	6.67
3rd place, bronze medalist(s)	Liu Yang (CHN)	6.74
4	Chan Yat Lok (HKG)	6.75
5	James Chan (HKG)	6.77
6	Malith Thamel (SRI)	6.87
7	Rashid Al-Aasmi (OMA)	6.90
8	Sami Ullah (PAK)	6.99

==== 4 × 60 m relay ====
26 April

Rank	Team	Athletes	Time
1st place, gold medalist(s)	China (CHN)	Huang Youchao, Li Mengyuan, Wang Xinkai, Ailikuti Yishake	26.06
2nd place, silver medalist(s)	Thailand (THA)	Chutithat Pruksorranan, Natawat Iamudom, Soraoat Dapbang, Puripol Boonson	26.68
3rd place, bronze medalist(s)	Sri Lanka (SRI)	Pramuditha Silva, Sadun Diyalawaththa, Malith Tharushan, Malith Thamel	27.57
4	Oman (OMA)	Fatek Bait Qisan, Salim Al-Yarabi, Mohamed Obaid Al-Saadi, Rashid Al-Aasmi	28.36

==== High jump ====
24 April

Rank	Athlete	Result
1st place, gold medalist(s)	Leonard Grospe (PHI)	2.05
2nd place, silver medalist(s)	Yeh Po-ting (TPE)	2.05
2nd place, silver medalist(s)	Zhang Hao (CHN)	2.05
4	Namir Al-Busaidi (OMA)	2.00
4	Li Jialun (CHN)	2.00
6	Parsa Shadnia (IRI)	2.00
7	Vishal Kavinda (SRI)	1.90
7	Salim Saidaliev (TJK)	1.90
9	Haitham Ahmed Yadin (YEM)	1.90
10	Methuja Lokuge (SRI)	1.90

==== Long jump ====
25 April

Rank	Athlete	Result
1st place, gold medalist(s)	Phạm Văn Nghĩa (VIE)	7.44
2nd place, silver medalist(s)	Tao Yege (CHN)	7.41
3rd place, bronze medalist(s)	Jayathra Sampath Miranda (SRI)	7.37
4	Salim Al-Yarabi (OMA)	7.28
5	Zheng Chengzhuo (CHN)	7.13
6	Lin Chia-hsing (TPE)	7.11
7	Inura Kavishan (SRI)	7.05
8	Nattapong Srinonta (THA)	6.96
9	Namir Al-Busaidi (OMA)	6.84
10	Mojtaba Zahedi (IRI)	6.81
11	Timur Isakov (KGZ)	6.77
12	Salim Saidaliev (TJK)	6.53
13	Abdul Aqil Abd Kadir (BRU)	5.25

==== Shot put ====
26 April

Rank	Athlete	Result
1st place, gold medalist(s)	Hassan Ajami (IRI)	20.17
2nd place, silver medalist(s)	Chen Chengyu (CHN)	19.95
3rd place, bronze medalist(s)	Zhang Haochen (CHN)	19.69
4	Mehran Khorand (IRI)	17.63
5	Eakkarin Boonlap (THA)	17.46
6	Mithun Raj (SRI)	16.89
7	Thatchakorn Noisri (THA)	16.50
8	Bodhitha Delwita (SRI)	14.01
DQ	Doston Rajabov (UZB)	~~18.39~~

- Doston Rajabov of the Uzbekistan originally finished 4th, but was later disqualified after he tested positive for doping.

=== Women ===
==== 60 m ====
===== Round 1 =====
24 April

Rank	Athlete	Time
Heat 1
1	Li He (CHN)	7.65
2	Supanich Poolkerd (THA)	7.73
3	Lianne Pama (PHI)	7.75
4	Yu Pui Yi (HKG)	7.77
5	Azza Al-Yarubi (OMA)	7.90
6	Tameen Khan (PAK)	8.16
7	Aishath Shabaa Saleem (MDV)	8.19
8	Asma Al-Zabidi (YEM)	9.94
Heat 2
1	Jessica Laurance (PHI)	7.50
2	Xu Jialu (CHN)	7.60
3	Thilakshi Anuruddhika (SRI)	7.67
4	Jonbibi Hukmova (UZB)	7.78
5	Sumaya Dewan (BAN)	7.90
6	Aliya Samarkul Kyzy (KGZ)	8.29
7	Alisa Miranda Pereira (TLS)	8.78
8	Angam Al-Zabidi (YEM)	9.84
Heat 3
1	Jirapat Khanonta (THA)	7.45
2	Faiqa Riaz (PAK)	7.56
3	Leung Kwan Yi (HKG)	7.59
4	Laylo Allaberganova (UZB)	7.77
5	Lakshika Sugandhi (SRI)	7.78
6	Ahnaa Nizaar (MDV)	7.81
7	Ekaterina Pavlenko (KGZ)	8.16

===== Final =====
25 April

Rank	Athlete	Time
1st place, gold medalist(s)	Jirapat Khanonta (THA)	7.46
2nd place, silver medalist(s)	Xu Jialu (CHN)	7.49
3rd place, bronze medalist(s)	Jessica Laurance (PHI)	7.52
4	Leung Kwan Yi (HKG)	7.63
5	Li He (CHN)	7.64
6	Supanich Poolkerd (THA)	7.67
7	Thilakshi Anuruddhika (SRI)	7.70
8	Faiqa Riaz (PAK)	7.75

==== 4 × 60 m relay ====
26 April

Rank	Heat	Team	Athletes	Time
1st place, gold medalist(s)	A	Thailand (THA)	Manatsada Sanmano, Jirapat Khanonta, Athicha Phetkun, Supanich Poolkerd	29.46
2nd place, silver medalist(s)	B	Philippines (PHI)	Kristina Knott, Shane Joy Ponce, Lianne Pama, Jessica Laurance	29.73
3rd place, bronze medalist(s)	B	China (CHN)	Li He, Zhou Jing, Dong Yuehua, Feng Lulu	30.42
4	B	Sri Lanka (SRI)	Thilakshi Anuruddhika Muthukumarana, W.H.M. Fernando, W.S.H. Fernando, L.S. Wijeweera Vithanage	30.93
5	A	Hong Kong (HKG)	Chan Pui Kei, Yu Pui Yi, Chloe Pak Hoi Man, Leung Kwan Yi	31.00
6	A	Maldives (MDV)	Aishath Shabaa Saleem, Shuaa Ahmed Rishfan, Hawwa Muznaa Faiz, Ahnaa Nizaar	33.49
—	A	Uzbekistan (UZB)	Jonbibi Hukmova, Nurkhon Ochilova, Lidiya Podsepkina, Laylo Allaberganova	DSQ

==== High jump ====
26 April

Rank	Athlete	Result
1st place, gold medalist(s)	Barnokhon Sayfullaeva (UZB)	1.85
2nd place, silver medalist(s)	Hu Linpeng (CHN)	1.83
2nd place, silver medalist(s)	Shao Yuqi (CHN)	1.83
4	Dương Thị Thảo (VIE)	1.78
5	Ranindi Pehansa (SRI)	1.70
6	Mariel Abuan (PHI)	1.60
6	Aliya Al-Mughairi (OMA)	1.60
6	Samadhi Weerasinghe (SRI)	1.60
9	Bùi Thị Kim Anh (VIE)	1.60

==== Long jump ====
24 April

Rank	Athlete	Result
1st place, gold medalist(s)	Hà Thị Thúy Hằng (VIE)	6.16
2nd place, silver medalist(s)	Ishara Samanmali (SRI)	5.87
3rd place, bronze medalist(s)	Sashikala Lankathilaka (SRI)	5.83
4	Vũ Thị Ngọc Hà (VIE)	5.81
5	Chen Liwen (CHN)	5.72
6	Parinya Chuaimaroeng (THA)	5.72
7	Supawat Choothong (THA)	5.66
8	Jia Wai Yin (HKG)	5.60
9	Roksana Khudoyarova (UZB)	5.32
10	Li Zhishuang (CHN)	5.17
11	Bat-Erdeniin Suvd-Erdene (MGL)	5.07
12	Aliya Samarkul Kyzy (KGZ)	5.04
13	Qurratul Ain Irwan (BRU)	4.40

==== Shot put ====
25 April

Rank	Athlete	Result
1st place, gold medalist(s)	Song Jiayuan (CHN)	19.15
2nd place, silver medalist(s)	Zhang Linru (CHN)	18.27
3rd place, bronze medalist(s)	Wu Ci-en (TPE)	16.40
4	Areerat Intadis (THA)	16.10
5	Ovini Chandrasekera (SRI)	12.96
6	Bazarsadyn Dulmaa (MGL)	12.90
7	Kavya Jayasuriya (SRI)	9.47
