= 2026 Asian Beach Games medal table =

The 2026 Asian Beach Games (2026年亚洲沙滩运动会; 2026 nián yàzhōu shātān yùndònghuì), officially the Sixth Asian Beach Games (Chinese: 第六届亚洲沙滩运动会; pinyin: Dì liù jiè yàzhōu shātān yùndònghuì), and commonly known as Sanya 2026 (三亚2026), was a continental multi-sport event for beach sports which was held from 22 to 30 April 2026 in Sanya, China. Sanya was the second Chinese city to host the Asian Beach Games, after Haiyang in 2012.

In this edition, Sri Lanka won its first ever gold medal.

== Medal table ==
The ranking in this table is consistent with International Olympic Committee convention in its published medal tables. By default, the table is ordered by the number of gold medals the athletes from a nation have won (in this context, a "nation" is an entity represented by an NOC). The number of silver medals is taken into consideration next and then the number of bronze medals. If nations are still tied, equal ranking is given and they are listed alphabetically.

* Host nation (China)

2026 Asian Beach Games Medal Table
Rank	Nation	Gold	Silver	Bronze	Total
1	China*	24	18	13	55
2	Thailand	10	9	9	28
3	Iran	9	1	0	10
4	Vietnam	3	5	5	13
5	Philippines	3	4	2	9
6	India	3	2	0	5
7	United Arab Emirates	2	2	2	6
8	Qatar	2	1	0	3
9	South Korea	1	4	5	10
10	Sri Lanka	1	2	4	7
11	Indonesia	1	2	0	3
12	Kazakhstan	1	1	6	8
13	Singapore	1	1	1	3
14	Uzbekistan	1	0	0	1
15	Hong Kong	0	2	1	3
15	Pakistan	0	2	1	3
17	North Korea	0	2	0	2
18	Chinese Taipei	0	1	4	5
19	Mongolia	0	1	3	4
20	Japan	0	1	2	3
21	Cambodia	0	1	1	2
22	Iraq	0	1	0	1
22	Oman	0	1	0	1
24	Myanmar	0	0	3	3
25	Saudi Arabia	0	0	2	2
26	Bahrain	0	0	1	1
26	Bangladesh	0	0	1	1
26	Kyrgyzstan	0	0	1	1
26	Lebanon	0	0	1	1
26	Malaysia	0	0	1	1
26	Nepal	0	0	1	1
Totals (31 entries)		62	64	70	196
