= Marathon swimming at the 2022 Asian Games – Men's 10 kilometre =

Men's 10 kilometre at the 2022 Asian Games
- Venue: Qiandao Lake
- Date: 7 October 2023
- Competitors: 16 from 9 nations

Medalists
gold medal	Zhang Ziyang	China
silver medal	Lan Tianchen	China
bronze medal	Park Jae-hun	South Korea

The men's marathon swimming event at the 2022 Asian Games was held in Chun'an Jieshou Sports Centre Swimming Course, Qiandao Lake, Hangzhou on 30 September 2023.

== Schedule ==
All times are China Standard Time (UTC+08:00)

Date	Time	Event
Saturday, 7 October 2023	08:30	Final

== Results ==
Legend

- DSQ — Disqualified

Rank	Athlete	Time
1st place, gold medalist(s)	Zhang Ziyang (CHN)	1:55:45.8
2nd place, silver medalist(s)	Lan Tianchen (CHN)	1:55:46.2
3rd place, bronze medalist(s)	Park Jae-hun (KOR)	1:56:00.3
4	Taishin Minamide (JPN)	1:56:09.7
5	Cho Cheng-chi (TPE)	1:56:09.8
6	Kaiki Furuhata (JPN)	1:58:20.6
7	Aflah Fadlan Prawira (INA)	1:59:06.4
8	Keith Sin (HKG)	2:00:53.4
9	Tanakrit Kittiya (THA)	2:02:20.5
10	Lev Cherepanov (KAZ)	2:02:22.0
11	William Yan Thorley (HKG)	2:02:22.2
12	Artyom Lukasevits (SGP)	2:02:37.0
13	Daniil Androssov (KAZ)	2:04:40.7
14	Ritchie Oh (SGP)	2:04:40.8
15	Sung Jun-ho (KOR)	2:06:50.4
—	Khomchan Wichachai (THA)	DSQ
