= Beach wrestling at the 2026 Asian Beach Games =

Wrestling competitions

- Venue: Yuhai Club
- Dates: 28–29 April 2016

Beach wrestling competition at the 2026 Asian Beach Games was held at the Yuhai Road Beach, Sanya Bay in Sanya, China from 28 to 29 April 2026. A total of 120 wrestlers from 27 nations participated.

== Medalists ==
=== Men ===
Event	Gold	Silver	Bronze
70 kg	Ali Akbar Zaroudi; Iran	Siddharth Chhillar; India	Adis Rakhat Uulu; Kyrgyzstan
80 kg	Ali Gholami; Iran	Muhammad Asad Ullah; Pakistan	Lu Feng; China
90 kg	Amir Hossein Kavousi; Iran	Muhammad Inam; Pakistan	Ganboldyn Törbold; Mongolia
+90 kg	Amir Reza Sahraei; Iran	Lu Da; China	Shamil Sharipov; Bahrain

=== Women ===
Event	Gold	Silver	Bronze
50 kg	Nipuni Wasana; Sri Lanka	Đoàn Thị Kim Oanh; Vietnam	Funa Yano; Japan
60 kg	Pushpa Yadav; India	Xie Mengyu; China	Nguyễn Thị Mỹ Hạnh; Vietnam
70 kg	Long Jia; China	Đặng Thị Linh; Vietnam	None awarded
+70 kg	Priya Malik; India	Zorigtyn Bolortungalag; Mongolia	Li Wenji; China

== Medal table ==
Rank	Nation	Gold	Silver	Bronze	Total
1	Iran (IRI)	4	0	0	4
2	India (IND)	2	1	0	3
3	China (CHN)	1	2	2	5
4	Sri Lanka (SRI)	1	0	0	1
5	Vietnam (VIE)	0	2	1	3
6	Pakistan (PAK)	0	2	0	2
7	Mongolia (MGL)	0	1	1	2
8	Bahrain (BRN)	0	0	1	1
8	Japan (JPN)	0	0	1	1
8	Kyrgyzstan (KGZ)	0	0	1	1
Totals (10 entries)		8	8	7	23

== Results ==
=== Men ===
==== 70 kg ====
===== Knockout matches =====
Qualifying round (Best of 3) – 28 April
Muhammad Abdullah (PAK)	2–1 (1–3, Fall, Fall)	Zhassulan Beksultanov (KAZ)
Yoshiki Yamada (JPN)	2–0 (3–2, 3–1)	Ou Xuexian (CHN)

===== Group round =====
28 April

Group A
Pos	Athlete	Pld	W	L	AFG	KSA	JPN	BRN
1	Shahram Mehraban (AFG)	3	3	0	—	3–2	2^{*}–2	1^{*}–1
2	Abdullatif Al-Bakri (KSA)	3	2	1	2–3	—	3–1	WO
3	Yoshiki Yamada (JPN)	3	1	2	2–2^{*}	1–3	—	1–0
4	Alibeg Alibegov (BRN)	3	0	3	1–1^{*}		0–1	—

Group B
Pos	Athlete	Pld	W	L	KGZ	PAK	VIE	YEM
1	Adis Rakhat Uulu (KGZ)	3	3	0	—	Fall	3–2	WO
2	Muhammad Abdullah (PAK)	3	2	1		—	3–1	Fall
3	Trần Văn Tòng (VIE)	3	1	2	2–3	1–3	—	WO
4	Abdullah Waqedi (YEM)	3	0	3				—

Group C
Pos	Athlete	Pld	W	L	THA	BAN	PHI	CAM
1	Phanomphon Daendongying (THA)	3	3	0	—	2–1	Fall	4–1
2	Juweel Hossan (BAN)	3	1	2	1–2	—	2–3	3–0
3	Joe Fer Callado (PHI)	3	1	2		3–2	—	0–3
4	Chhoeun Chheang (CAM)	3	1	2	1–4	0–3	3–0	—

Group D
Pos	Athlete	Pld	W	L	IRI	IND	JOR	QAT
1	Ali Akbar Zaroudi (IRI)	3	3	0	—	3–0	3–0	WO
2	Siddharth Chhillar (IND)	3	2	1	0–3	—	3–1	3–0
3	Zaid Meslah (JOR)	3	1	2	0–3	1–3	—	3–0
4	Hamad Al-Naimi (QAT)	3	0	3		0–3	0–3	—

Source: UWW

===== Final round =====
Quarterfinals; 28 April
Shahram Mehraban (AFG)	0
Siddharth Chhillar (IND)	3
Muhammad Abdullah (PAK)	Fall
Phanomphon Daendongying (THA)
Ali Akbar Zaroudi (IRI)	3
Abdullatif Al-Bakri (KSA)	1
Juweel Hossan (BAN)	0
Adis Rakhat Uulu (KGZ)	3

Semifinals; 28 April
Siddharth Chhillar (IND)	1
Muhammad Abdullah (PAK)	0
Ali Akbar Zaroudi (IRI)	2
Adis Rakhat Uulu (KGZ)	0

Final; 29 April
Siddharth Chhillar (IND)	0
Ali Akbar Zaroudi (IRI)	3
Bronze
Muhammad Abdullah (PAK)	1
Adis Rakhat Uulu (KGZ)	3

==== 80 kg ====
===== Knockout matches =====
Qualifying round (Best of 3) – 28 April
Muath Al-Rashdi (KSA)	2–1 (Fall, 1–3, Fall)	Rayyan Aburiala (PLE)

===== Group round =====
28 April

Group A
Pos	Athlete	Pld	W	L	CHN	JPN	SYR	KSA
1	Lu Feng (CHN)	3	3	0	—	2–0	3–0	Fall
2	Sanshiro Ishihara (JPN)	3	2	1	0–2	—	2^{*}–2	3–2
3	Anas Al-Khaledi (SYR)	3	1	2	0–3	2–2^{*}	—	2–1
4	Muath Al-Rashdi (KSA)	3	0	3		2–3	1–2	—

Group B
Pos	Athlete	Pld	W	L	KAZ	AFG	BAN	PHI
1	Yermakhan Koshkinbayev (KAZ)	3	3	0	—	3–1	2^{*}–2	3–0
2	Ahmad Farukh Sharifi (AFG)	3	2	1	1–3	—	1–0	1–0
3	Ali Amjad (BAN)	3	1	2	2–2^{*}	0–1	—	4–0
4	Fierre Afan (PHI)	3	0	3	0–3	0–1	0–4	—

Group C
Pos	Athlete	Pld	W	L	IRI	KGZ	TJK	YEM
1	Ali Gholami (IRI)	3	3	0	—	Fall	3–0	Fall
2	Kubat Azizbaev (KGZ)	3	2	1		—	1–0	1–0
3	Alirizo Bakhromov (TJK)	3	1	2	0–3	0–1	—	2–0
4	Maged Khazragi (YEM)	3	0	3		0–1	0–2	—

Group D
Pos	Athlete	Pld	W	L	PAK	VIE	NEP	CAM
1	Muhammad Asad Ullah (PAK)	3	3	0	—	3–0	3–1	Fall
2	Nguyễn Văn Hảo (VIE)	3	2	1	0–3	—	3–1	3–1
3	Suresh Chunara (NEP)	3	1	2	1–3	1–3	—	3–1
4	Heng Rottha (CAM)	3	0	3		1–3	1–3	—

Group E
Pos	Athlete	Pld	W	L	IND	BRN	SRI	QAT
1	Sachin Mor (IND)	3	3	0	—	2–0	Fall	Fall
2	Magomedrasul Asluev (BRN)	3	2	1	0–2	—	3–0	3–0
3	Lakmal Wijesooriya (SRI)	3	1	2		0–3	—	Fall
4	Saad Al-Hammadi (QAT)	3	0	3		0–3		—

Source: UWW

===== Final round =====
Quarterfinals; 28 April
Lu Feng (CHN)	3
Sanshiro Ishihara (JPN)	0
Sachin Mor (IND)	2
Muhammad Asad Ullah (PAK)	3
Ali Gholami (IRI)	3
Magomedrasul Asluev (BRN)	0
Nguyễn Văn Hảo (VIE)	2
Yermakhan Koshkinbayev (KAZ)	3

Semifinals; 28 April
Lu Feng (CHN)	0
Muhammad Asad Ullah (PAK)	4
Ali Gholami (IRI)	Fall
Yermakhan Koshkinbayev (KAZ)

Final; 29 April
Muhammad Asad Ullah (PAK)
Ali Gholami (IRI)	Fall
Bronze
Lu Feng (CHN)	3
Yermakhan Koshkinbayev (KAZ)	0

==== 90 kg ====
===== Knockout matches =====
Qualifying round (Best of 3) – 28 April
Shuichiro Sato (JPN)	1–2 (2–3, 3–1, 2–4)	Khaknazar Nazarov (TJK)
Amir Hossein Kavousi (IRI)	2–0 (3–0, 3–0)	Madushanka Premarathna (SRI)

===== Group round =====
28 April

Group A
Pos	Athlete	Pld	W	L	IRI	BRN	VIE	SGP
1	Amir Hossein Kavousi (IRI)	3	3	0	—	Fall	3–0	3–0
2	Magomed Sharipov (BRN)	3	2	1		—	2–0	3–2
3	Ngô Văn Lâm (VIE)	3	1	2	0–3	0–2	—	3–1
4	Gary Chow (SGP)	3	0	3	0–3	2–3	1–3	—

Group B
Pos	Athlete	Pld	W	L	TJK	CHN	JOR	SYR
1	Khaknazar Nazarov (TJK)	3	2	1	—	2–3	Fall	3–0
2	Li Peilong (CHN)	3	2	1	3–2	—	0–2	4–0
3	Abdallah Makoon (JOR)	3	2	1		2–0	—	3–2
4	Khaled Al-Refaei (SYR)	3	0	3	0–3	0–4	2–3	—

Group C
Pos	Athlete	Pld	W	L	KGZ	MGL	KOR	CAM
1	Seitbek Dokturbek Uulu (KGZ)	3	2	1	—	Fall	2–3	2–1
2	Ganboldyn Törbold (MGL)	3	2	1		—	2–0	2–1
3	Lee Gyeong-yeon (KOR)	3	1	2	3–2	0–2	—	1–2
4	Heng Vuthy (CAM)	3	1	2	1–2	1–2	2–1	—

Group D
Pos	Athlete	Pld	W	L	PAK	IND	KAZ	PHI
1	Muhammad Inam (PAK)	3	3	0	—	3–2	Fall	Fall
2	Aryan (IND)	3	2	1	2–3	—	3–0	3–0
3	Baurzhan Mussin (KAZ)	3	1	2		0–3	—	3–0
4	Neonards Cervantes (PHI)	3	0	3		0–3	0–3	—

Source: UWW

===== Final round =====
Quarterfinals; 28 April
Amir Hossein Kavousi (IRI)	3
Aryan (IND)	0
Li Peilong (CHN)	3
Seitbek Dokturbek Uulu (KGZ)	0
Muhammad Inam (PAK)	2
Magomed Sharipov (BRN)	0
Ganboldyn Törbold (MGL)	3
Khaknazar Nazarov (TJK)	1

Semifinals; 28 April
Amir Hossein Kavousi (IRI)	3
Li Peilong (CHN)	0
Muhammad Inam (PAK)	1
Ganboldyn Törbold (MGL)	0

Final; 29 April
Amir Hossein Kavousi (IRI)	3
Muhammad Inam (PAK)	0
Bronze
Li Peilong (CHN)	1
Ganboldyn Törbold (MGL)	3

==== +90 kg ====
===== Group round =====
28 April

Group A
Pos	Athlete	Pld	W	L	BRN	MGL	PAK	NEP
1	Shamil Sharipov (BRN)	3	3	0	—	1–0	2–1	3–0
2	Chinbatyn Altangerel (MGL)	3	2	1	0–1	—	3–0	3–0
3	Muhammad Gulzar (PAK)	3	1	2	1–2	0–3	—	3–0
4	Triloki Yadav (NEP)	3	0	3	0–3	0–3	0–3	—

Group B
Pos	Athlete	Pld	W	L	KOR	KSA	JOR	JPN
1	Kim Gwan-uk (KOR)	3	3	0	—	3–0	3–0	Fall
2	Rayane Mohammed (KSA)	3	2	1	0–3	—	4–2	3–0
3	Abdulkareem Abuidaij (JOR)	3	1	2	0–3	2–4	—	3–0
4	Asahi Imamura (JPN)	3	0	3		0–3	0–3	—

Group C
Pos	Athlete	Pld	W	L	IRI	KGZ	KAZ	SYR
1	Amir Reza Sahraei (IRI)	3	2	1	—	3–0	Fall	3–0
2	Muzafar Zhappuev (KGZ)	3	2	1	0–3	—	2–1	1^{*}–1
3	Omar Eyubov (KAZ)	3	1	2		1–2	—	1^{*}–1
4	Anwar Sharfawi (SYR)	3	1	2	0–3	1–1^{*}	1–1^{*}	—

Group D
Pos	Athlete	Pld	W	L	CHN	IND	TJK	PHI
1	Lu Da (CHN)	3	3	0	—	3–1	3–0	3–0
2	Jaspooran Singh (IND)	3	2	1	1–3	—	3–0	3–0
3	Dadakhon Kurbonaliev (TJK)	3	1	2	0–3	0–3	—	3–0
4	Callum Roberts (PHI)	3	0	3	0–3	0–3	0–3	—

Source: UWW

===== Final round =====
Quarterfinals; 28 April
Shamil Sharipov (BRN)	1
Jaspooran Singh (IND)	0
Rayane Mohammed (KSA)	0
Amir Reza Sahraei (IRI)	3
Lu Da (CHN)	1
Chinbatyn Altangerel (MGL)	0
Muzafar Zhappuev (KGZ)	3
Kim Gwan-uk (KOR)	2

Semifinals; 28 April
Shamil Sharipov (BRN)
Amir Reza Sahraei (IRI)	Fall
Lu Da (CHN)	Fall
Muzafar Zhappuev (KGZ)

Final; 29 April
Amir Reza Sahraei (IRI)	3
Lu Da (CHN)	0
Bronze
Shamil Sharipov (BRN)	3
Muzafar Zhappuev (KGZ)	0

=== Women ===
==== 50 kg ====
===== Group round =====
28 April

Group A
Pos	Athlete	Pld	W	L	JPN	IND	TPE	JOR
1	Funa Yano (JPN)	3	3	0	—	3–1	3–0	Fall
2	Priyanshi Prajapat (IND)	3	2	1	1–3	—	2–1	Fall
3	Chen Wei-wen (TPE)	3	1	2	0–3	1–2	—	1^{*}–1
4	Noura Taaibin (JOR)	3	0	3			1–1^{*}	—

Group B
Pos	Athlete	Pld	W	L	VIE	KOR	KGZ	PHI
1	Đoàn Thị Kim Oanh (VIE)	3	3	0	—	3–0	2–0	2–0
2	Cheon Mi-ran (KOR)	3	2	1	0–3	—	4–0	3–0
3	Anara Ryskulova (KGZ)	3	1	2	0–2	0–4	—	Fall
4	Aliah Rose Gavalez (PHI)	3	0	3	0–2	0–3		—

Group C
Pos	Athlete	Pld	W	L	SRI	CHN	KAZ	CAM
1	Nipuni Wasana (SRI)	3	3	0	—	3–0	4–0	3–0
2	Liang Jinyue (CHN)	3	2	1	0–3	—	2–0	Fall
3	Laura Ganikyzy (KAZ)	3	1	2	0–4	0–2	—	Fall
4	Dit Samnang (CAM)	3	0	3	0–3			—

Source: UWW

===== Final round =====
Semifinals; 28 April
Funa Yano (JPN)
Nipuni Wasana (SRI)	Fall
Đoàn Thị Kim Oanh (VIE)	3
Priyanshi Prajapat (IND)	0

Final; 29 April
Nipuni Wasana (SRI)	3
Đoàn Thị Kim Oanh (VIE)	1
Bronze
Funa Yano (JPN)	WO
Priyanshi Prajapat (IND)

==== 60 kg ====
===== Knockout matches =====
Qualifying round (Best of 3) – 28 April
Nethmi Ahinsa (SRI)	0–2 (1–3, 0–3)	Pushpa Yadav (IND)
Danielle Lim (SGP)	0–2 (1–3, 1–3)	Miriam Grace Balisme (PHI)

===== Group round =====
28 April

Group A
Pos	Athlete	Pld	W	L	VIE	KOR	PHI	CAM
1	Nguyễn Thị Mỹ Hạnh (VIE)	3	3	0	—	3–0	3–0	Fall
2	Kwon Young-jin (KOR)	3	2	1	0–3	—	Fall	3–1
3	Miriam Grace Balisme (PHI)	3	1	2	0–3		—	3–0
4	Chhoeun Sreylen (CAM)	3	0	3		1–3	0–3	—

Group B
Pos	Athlete	Pld	W	L	IND	KAZ	JPN	JOR
1	Pushpa Yadav (IND)	3	3	0	—	2–1	3–0	Fall
2	Diana Kayumova (KAZ)	3	2	1	1–2	—	3–1	3–0
3	Rui Nagatomi (JPN)	3	1	2	0–3	1–3	—	Fall
4	Balqis Taaibin (JOR)	3	0	3		0–3		—

Group C
Pos	Athlete	Pld	W	L	CHN	KGZ	TPE	MGL
1	Xie Mengyu (CHN)	3	3	0	—	3–1	3–0	3–0
2	Akylai Satybaeva (KGZ)	3	2	1	1–3	—	3–0	3–0
3	Cheng Yu-hsuan (TPE)	3	1	2	0–3	0–3	—	3–1
4	Davaajargalyn Erdenetsetseg (MGL)	3	0	3	0–3	0–3	1–3	—

Source: UWW

===== Final round =====
Semifinals; 28 April
Nguyễn Thị Mỹ Hạnh (VIE)	2
Xie Mengyu (CHN)	3
Pushpa Yadav (IND)	3
Kwon Young-jin (KOR)	1

Final; 29 April
Xie Mengyu (CHN)	0
Pushpa Yadav (IND)	3
Bronze
Nguyễn Thị Mỹ Hạnh (VIE)	4
Kwon Young-jin (KOR)	0

==== 70 kg ====
===== Knockout matches =====
Qualifying round (Best of 3) – 28 April
Jaspreet Kaur (IND)	2–0 (3–0, Fall)	Sushila Chand (NEP)

===== Group round =====
28 April

Group A
Pos	Athlete	Pld	W	L	IND	KAZ	JPN	CAM
1	Jaspreet Kaur (IND)	3	3	0	—	2–0	2–0	3–0
2	Beibit Seidualy (KAZ)	3	2	1	0–2	—	Fall	Fall
3	Makia Kimura (JPN)	3	1	2	0–2		—	3–0
4	Chea Kanha (CAM)	3	0	3	0–3		0–3	—

Group B
Pos	Athlete	Pld	W	L	CHN	VIE	KGZ	JOR
1	Long Jia (CHN)	3	3	0	—	1–0	2–0	3–0
2	Đặng Thị Linh (VIE)	3	2	1	0–1	—	Fall	2–0
3	Kaiyrkul Sharshebaeva (KGZ)	3	1	2	0–2		—	3–0
4	Tala Abukheit (JOR)	3	0	3	0–3	0–2	0–3	—

Source: UWW

===== Final round =====
Semifinals; 28 April
Jaspreet Kaur (IND)
Đặng Thị Linh (VIE)	Fall
Long Jia (CHN)	3
Beibit Seidualy (KAZ)	1

Final; 29 April
Đặng Thị Linh (VIE)
Long Jia (CHN)	Fall
Bronze
Jaspreet Kaur (IND)	2
Beibit Seidualy (KAZ)	0

- Jaspreet Kaur of India originally won the bronze medal, but was disqualified after she tested positive for Octodrine.

==== +70 kg ====
===== Knockout matches =====
Qualifying round (Best of 3) – 28 April
Alina Yertostik (KAZ)	2–0 (Fall, 2–1)	Phạm Thị Huyền Trang (VIE)

===== Group round =====
28 April

Group A
Pos	Athlete	Pld	W	L	IND	KAZ	KGZ	THA
1	Priya Malik (IND)	3	3	0	—	2–0	3–0	Fall
2	Alina Yertostik (KAZ)	3	2	1	0–2	—	3–0	Fall
3	Aizharkyn Zhanybekova (KGZ)	3	1	2	0–3	0–3	—	3–0
4	Banjong Poonmat (THA)	3	0	3			0–3	—

Group B
Pos	Athlete	Pld	W	L	MGL	CHN	KOR	TPE
1	Zorigtyn Bolortungalag (MGL)	3	3	0	—	3–0	3–0	3–0
2	Li Wenji (CHN)	3	2	1	0–3	—	2–0	3–0
3	Jeong Seo-yeon (KOR)	3	1	2	0–3	0–2	—	Fall
4	Cai Sheng-fang (TPE)	3	0	3	0–3	0–3		—

Source: UWW

===== Final round =====
Semifinals; 28 April
Priya Malik (IND)	2
Li Wenji (CHN)	0
Zorigtyn Bolortungalag (MGL)	3
Alina Yertostik (KAZ)	0

Final; 29 April
Priya Malik (IND)	3
Zorigtyn Bolortungalag (MGL)	2
Bronze
Li Wenji (CHN)	2
Alina Yertostik (KAZ)	0
