= Faiqa Riaz =

Pakistani sprinter (born 1999)

Faiqa Riaz TI OLY
Personal information
- Born: 6 September 1999 (age 27) Lahore, Punjab, Pakistan
- Height: 1.63 m (5 ft 4 in)

Sport
- Sport: Athletics
- Event: Sprints

Achievements and titles
- Personal best: 100 m: 11.96 (2026)

Faiqa Riaz TI (born 6 September 1999) is a Pakistani sprinter. She represented Pakistan in women's 100 m at the 2024 Paris Olympics.

== Early life ==
Faiqa Riaz was born on 6 September 1999 in Lahore in Punjab, Pakistan. She completed her intermediate education at Lahore College for Women University and earned a Bachelor's degree from Superior University, Lahore. She later obtained a Master's degree in Accounting and Finance.

== Career ==
Faiqa initially played field hockey as a right-in/right-out and attended Pakistan's national hockey team camp ahead of their Thailand tour in 2016. She later left hockey to focus exclusively on athletics.

She made her international athletics debut at the 2018 South Asian U20 Athletics Championships held in Sri Lanka, where she finished seventh in the women's 100 m event with a timing of 13.38.

In 2023, she won the women's 100 m event at the National Athletics Championships in Attock with a timing of 12.00, representing the WAPDA, thereby becoming the national champion.

She represented Pakistan at the 2024 Paris Olympics after receiving a universality place. Competing in the women's 100 m event, she recorded a personal best of 12.49 and finished 24th overall in the preliminary round.

At the 2025 National Games held in Karachi, she won four gold medals: three in individual events (100 m, 200 m, long jump) and one as part of the 4x400 m relay team.

Faiqa served as the nation's joint flag-bearer alongside wrestler Muhammad Inam at the 2026 Asian Beach Games opening ceremony, where she successfully qualified for the women's 60m final by clocking 7.56 in the heats before ultimately finishing 8th in the finals with a time of 7.75. In the women's 100 m event at the 2026 Commonwealth Games, she clocked 11.64 (+2.4 m/s) in the heats and did not advance into the final. She clocked a personal best of 11.96 seconds in the women's 100 m at the 2026 Asian Games in Nagoya, finishing 5th in her heat while setting a new personal best on the Asian Games stage. She won the gold medal in the women's 100 metres at the 54th National Athletics Championships in Karachi, clocking 11.56 seconds to claim the fastest woman title.

== International Competitions ==
Representing Pakistan
Year	Competition	Venue	Position	Event	Notes
2018	South Asian U20 Championships	Colombo, Sri Lanka	7th	100 m	13.38
2024	Olympic Games	Paris, France	24th	100 m	12.49
2026	Asian Beach Games	Sanya, China	8th	60 m	7.75
2026	Commonwealth Games	Glasgow, Scotland	21st	100 m	11.64
2026	Asian Games	Nagoya, Japan	19th	100 m	11.96

== See also ==
- Athletics in Pakistan
- Pakistan at the Olympics
