= Zhang Ziyang =

Chinese swimmer (born 2001)

Personal information
- Nationality: Chinese
- Born: 1 January 2001 (age 25)

Sport
- Sport: Swimming
Medal record
Men's swimming
Representing China
Asian Games
Gold medal – first place	2022 Hangzhou	10km marathon
Silver medal – second place	2022 Hangzhou	4x200m freestyle
Asian Beach Games
Gold medal – first place	2026 Sanya	5km
Gold medal – first place	2026 Sanya	Mixed relay

Zhang Ziyang (born 1 January 2001) is a Chinese swimmer. He competed in the men's 4 × 200 metre freestyle relay at the 2020 Summer Olympics.

Zhang competed in the men's 10km marathon swimming during the 2022 Asian Games and won a gold medal.
