= India at the 2026 Asian Beach Games =

- IOC code: IND
- NOC: Indian Olympic Association (IOA)
- Website: olympic.ind.in

in Sanya, China 22–30 April 2026
- Competitors: 31 in 4 sports
- Medals Ranked 5th: Gold 3 Silver 2 Bronze 0 Total 5

Asian Beach Games appearances
- 2008; 2010; 2012; 2014; 2016; 2026

India competed at the 2026 Asian Beach Games from 22 to 30 April 2026 in Sanya, Hainan, China. This marks the return of the Asian Beach Games, ten years since the 2016 edition in Da Nang, Vietnam.

== Competitors ==
The following is the list of the number of competitors participating at the Games per sport/discipline.

Sport	Men	Women	Total
3x3 basketball	4	0	4
Beach kabaddi	6	6	12
Beach wrestling	4	4	8
Sailing	4	3	6
Total	18	13	31

== Medalists ==
Medal	Name	Sport	Event	Date
Gold	Ritu Sheoran; Manisha Kumari; Simran Kamboj; Manpreet Kaur; Nikita Kumari; Nikita Chauhan	Beach kabaddi	Women's tournament	27 April
Gold	Pushpa Yadav	Beach wrestling	Women's 60 kg	29 April
Gold	Priya	Beach wrestling	Women's +70 kg	29 April
Silver	Brijendra Singh Choudhary; Jitendra Yadav; Jai Bhagwan; Neeraj Narwal; Bhanu Pratap Tomar; Yatharth Deshwal	Beach kabaddi	Men's tournament	27 April
Silver	Siddharth	Beach wrestling	Men's 70 kg	29 April
~~Bronze~~	Jaspreet Kaur	Beach wrestling	Women's 70 kg	29 April

- Jaspreet Kaur of India originally won the bronze medal, but was disqualified after she tested positive for Octodrine.

== 3x3 basketball ==
Summary

Event	Group Stage				Qualifiers	Quarterfinals	Semifinals	Final / BM	
Event	Opposition Score	Opposition Score	Opposition Score	Rank	Opposition Score	Opposition Score	Opposition Score	Opposition Score	Rank
Men's team	Kazakhstan; W 19–11	Bahrain; W 20–12	Qatar; L 12–15	2 q	Sri Lanka –				
Women's team	Sri Lanka; WD	Singapore; WD	Thailand; WD	—N/a	Did not advance				

=== Men's tournament ===
Team roster

- Harsh Dagar
- Kushal Singh
- Arvind Kumar
- Pranav Prince

Preliminary rounds – Group C

Pos	Team	Pld	W	L	PF	PA	PD
1	Qatar	3	3	0	57	38	+19
2	India	3	2	1	51	37	+14
3	Bahrain	3	1	2	44	55	−11
4	Kazakhstan	3	0	3	39	61	−22

Source: FIBA

25 April
17:35

Report

India	19–10	Kazakhstan
Pts: Dagar 7		Pts: Oralbekov 4

Sports Centre Gymnasium, Sanya
Referees: Cong (CHN), Chen (TPE)

25 April
19:15

Report

Bahrain	12–20	India
Pts: Dragović 6		Pts: Dagar 8

Sports Centre Gymnasium, Sanya
Referees: Nagoshi (JPN), Cong (CHN)

27 April
13:05

Report

Qatar	15–12	India
Pts: Janjić, Saad 7		Pts: Dagar 6

Sports Centre Gymnasium, Sanya
Referees: Leong (SGP), Cong (CHN)

Qualifier

28 April
11:50

Report

India	19–18	Sri Lanka
Pts: Singh 9		Pts: Nilantha 8

Sports Centre Gymnasium, Sanya
Referees: Dale (NZL), Cong (CHN)

=== Women's tournament ===
India entered a team in the women's tournament. However they withdrew with their fixtures declared a forfeit.

== Beach kabaddi ==
Summary

Event	Group Stage				Semifinals	Final	
Event	Opposition Score	Opposition Score	Opposition Score	Rank	Opposition Score	Opposition Score	Rank
Men's team	Chinese Taipei; W 66–23	Thailand; W 52–32	Sri Lanka; W 54–33	1 Q	Pakistan; W 50–28		
Women's team	Sri Lanka; W 44–32	Syria; W 64–22	—N/a	1 Q	Bangladesh; W 50–31		

== Beach wrestling ==
Men's

- Siddharth – 70kg
- Sachin Mor – 80kg
- Aryan – 90kg
- Jaspooran Singh – +90kg

Women's

- Priyanshi Prajapat – 50kg
- Pushpa Yadav – 60kg
- Jaspeet Kaur – 70kg
- Priya – +70kg

== Sailing ==
Men's

- Vasu Chandrawanshi – ILCA 4 boys
- Krishna Venkatachalam Ramakrishnan – optimist boys
- Vinay Vishwanath Kulabkar – foil windsurfing boys
- Chitresh Tatha – formula kite men

Women's

- Aastha Pandey – ILCA 4 girls
- Shringhari Roy – optimist girls
- Ovie Nair Shaffi – foil windsurfing girls
