= Jung Yong-jun =

South Korean writer (born 1981)

Jung Yong-jun (Korean: 정용준; born in 1981) is a South Korean writer.

== Life ==
Jung was born in 1981 in Gwangju. He graduated from Chosun University for Russian studies, and then studied creative writing in the same university’s graduate school. He began his literary career with his short story Good Night, Oblo (굿나잇, 오블로), which won the 2009 Hyundai Literature Prize for New Writers.

Jung first started writing fiction at 26. He began meeting people who wrote fiction, attended literature classes, and then ultimately entered a graduate school. He has said that he was not sure whether he had talent for writing, but it was the first time he had felt that strange feeling of wanting to continue doing it, and improve on it, as well as be with it. Thus, he has continued writing fiction to this day.

Since he was young, Jung stuttered. As he grew up, he taught himself to deal with it. He has stated that he constantly tried things whenever he spoke like changing the words slightly when saying them out loud, and inverting sentences to change the first sentence. However, he stutters a lot in front of family, though because they don’t make fun of him stuttering, he has said in an interview that he can speak very comfortably with them and say what he wants to say. His thoughts on language came from his habit of stuttering, leading to his short story Tteo Tteo Tteo, Tteo (떠떠떠, 떠) and the novel Babel (바벨).

He has published short story collections Gana (가나), Aren’t We Blood Relatives? (우리는 혈육이 아니냐), and the novel Babel (바벨). He was awarded the Hwang Sun-won Literary Award for his short story A Walk Along Seolleung (선릉산책) in 2016.

He currently teaches at the Creative Arts Department of Seoul Institute of the Arts and is active as the member of "Text Experiment Group Ru" with Kim Taeyong and Han Yujoo.

== Writing ==
Writer Paik Gahuim on Jung,

“The way his sentences draw the reader in is absolutely outstanding. The blade of the imagination of a novel where language is the protagonist, and of the writing skills that come from his small form is sharp and powerful. His form is small. Of course, just his height. He has broad shoulders and a strong body. He is a writer who holds up the world with his small but strong body. He stands on the ground with short but solid legs. That is how a writer should be.”

The record of this impression on the writer is much in line with the literary appraisal of Jung. Jung writes on various subjects. Jung presents various types of narratives, which can be seen in Gana (가나), where a body wanders across the ocean on its way toward the home that it longs for, Meok-I (먹이 The Feed), where a delusional man is met by a wild predator in his own world (room), and Saranghaeseo geuraetseumnida (사랑해서 그랬습니다 Because I Loved), where a fetus kills itself while still in the womb for the sake of its young mother, who had become pregnant unintentionally.

Particularly, he often lays out very profound thoughts on language by reflecting his experiences of stuttering from when he was young on his narratives. Such examples are Tteo Tteo Tteo, Tteo (떠떠떠, 떠), which is a story about the love of a stuttering man that works in an amusement park, and Babel (바벨), which is a story about a new age called Babel, where everyone doesn’t speak due to the rotten smell called ‘pellets’ produced by talking, a result of a failed experiment for crystallization of speech.

== Works ==
=== Short Story Collection ===
- Gana (가나), Moonji Publishing, 2011.
- Urineun hyeolyuki aninya (우리는 혈육이 아니냐 Aren’t We Blood Relatives?), Monhakdongne, 2015.

=== Novels ===
- Babel (바벨), Moonji Publishing, 2014.

== Awards ==
- 2016: 16th Hwang Sun-won Literary Award
- 2016: 5th Sonagi Village Literary Award
