= Yan Peng (basketball) =

Chinese basketball player

Yan Peng 颜鹏
Personal information
- Born: 6 January 1996 (age 30) Haozhou, Anhui, China
- Listed height: 1.98 m (6 ft 6 in)
- Listed weight: 92 kg (203 lb)

Career information
- Playing career: 2018–present
- Position: Small forward

Career history
- 2018–2021: Shanghai Sharks
Medals
Men's 3x3 basketball
Representing China
Asia Cup
Silver medal – second place	2025 Singapore	Team
Asian Beach Games
Bronze medal – third place	2026 Sanya	Team

Yan Peng (born 6 January 1996) is a Chinese basketball player for Chinese 3x3 national team and former CBA player of Shanghai Sharks.

He represented China at the 2020 Summer Olympics.
