= Chen Chengyu =

Chinese shot putter (born 2002)

Personal information
- Born: 25 October 2002 (age 23)

Sport
- Sport: Athletics
- Event: Shot put

Achievements and titles
- Personal best: Shot put: 20.37m (2025)
Medal record
Men's athletics
Representing China
Asian Indoor Championships
Gold medal – first place	2026 Tianjin	Shot put

Chen Chengyu (born 25 October 2002) is a Chinese shot putter. He was the gold medalist at the 2026 Asian Indoor Athletics Championships.

== Career ==
A student of Tsinghua University, in November 2025, Chen won the gold medal at the National Games of China, with a personal best throw of 20.37 metres.

In February 2026, he won the gold medal in the shot put at the 2026 Asian Indoor Athletics Championships in Tianjin, China, with a championship record 20.07 metres.
