= Harsh Dagar =

Indian basketball player

Harsh Dagar (born 23 February 2005) is an Indian basketball player from Uttar Pradesh. He plays for the India men's national basketball team as a shooting guard. He plays for Uttar Pradesh in the domestic tournaments.

== Early life ==
Dagar lives in Gurugram. His father died when he was five years old. His mother, a tailor, brough him up. He started playing football as a child but soon shifted to basketball due to his elder brother Apurv, a state-level basketball player and local coach. His first basketball coach was Vikram encouraged him to attend ACG NBA Jump programme in 2018 and then he got a scholarship for the NBA India Academy.

== Career ==
Dagar was part of the Indian team that won the South Asian Games in 2019 in Nepal. He represented the NBA India Academy at the European Youth Basketball League and NBA Academy Youth Games in 2018 and 2019.

In 2022, he played the FIBA U16 Asian Championship and also represented India in the FIBA U18 Asian Championship 2022. In 2023, he represented India in the FIBA Basketball World Cup 2023 Asian Qualifiers. In 2023, he was also part of the Indian team that played the FIBA Olympic Pre-Qualifying Tournament at Syria.

In March 2025, he played 6 matches in the FIBA Asia Cup qualifiers at Manama, and in the crucial match against Bahrain, he was the top scorer 28 points, including 18 from three pointers, as India beat the higher-ranked team. He went on to play the FIBA Asia Cup in August 2025. He was also part of the Indian team that played the World Cup 2027 Asian Qualifiers.

In 2025, he played for BCH Knights in the Mongolian Professional Basketball League.

He also plays for the Indian 3x3 team. In October 2022, the Indian men's U17 3x3 basketball team qualified for the 2023 FIBA U18 3x3 World Cup by finishing second in the 3x3 Asia Cup.
