= Dejan Janjić =

Serbian basketball player (born 1995)

Personal information
- Born: November 14, 1995 (age 31) Novi Sad, Serbia, FR Yugoslavia
- Listed height: 1.98 m (6 ft 6 in)
- Listed weight: 90 kg (198 lb)

Career information
- NBA draft: 2017: undrafted
- Playing career: 2013–present
- Position: Shooting guard

Career history
- 2013–2016: Vojvodina
- 2016–2017: Napredak Kruševac
- 2017–2018: Vojvodina
- 2018–2019: Mega Bemax
- 2019–2020: Sloboda Tuzla
- 2020–2021: Vršac
- 2021–2022: Hercegovac Gajdobra
Medals
Men's 3x3 basketball
Representing Qatar
Islamic Solidarity Games
Bronze medal – third place	2025 Riyadh	Team
Asian Beach Games
Gold medal – first place	2026 Sanya	Team

Dejan Janjić (Serbian Cyrillic: Дејан Јањић; born November 14, 1995) is a Serbian-born Qatari basketball player who last played for Hercegovac Gajdobra of the Second Basketball League of Serbia.

== Professional career ==
In his professional career, Janjić had two stints with his hometown team Vojvodina and he played one season for Napredak Kruševac.

On July 19, 2018, Janjić signed a multi-year contract for the Mega Bemax of the Basketball League of Serbia. On August 8, 2019, Janjić signed for Bosnian team Sloboda Tuzla.
