= Japan at the 2026 Asian Beach Games =

- IOC code: JPN
- NOC: Japanese Olympic Committee
- Website: www.joc.or.jp

in Sanya, China 22–30 April 2026
- Competitors: 27 in 4 sports
- Flag bearers (opening): Yuya Kobayashi; Miki Ishii
- Flag bearer (closing): Yoshiki Yamada
- Medals: Gold 0 Silver 1 Bronze 2 Total 3

Asian Beach Games appearances
- 2008; 2010; 2012; 2014; 2016; 2026

Japan competed in the 2026 Asian Beach Games in Sanya, Hainan, China from 22 to 30 April 2026. This marks the return of the Asian Beach Games, ten years since the 2016 edition in Da Nang, Vietnam.

Aquathlon athlete Yuya Kobayashi and beach volleyball player Miki Ishii were the flagbearers for the opening ceremony. Beach wrestler Yoshiki Yamada was the flagbearer for the closing ceremony

== Competitors ==
The following is the list of the number of competitors participating at the Games per sport/discipline.

Sport	Men	Women	Total
Aquathlon	2	2	4
Beach volleyball	4	4	8
Beach wrestling	4	3	7
Sport climbing	4	4	8
Total	14	13	27

== Medalists ==
Medal	Name	Sport	Event	Date
Silver	Ren Matsumoto; Non Matsumoto	Beach volleyball	Women's team	29 April
Bronze	Mao Shimazaki; Isaki Oku; Ikumi Seto; Yuya Kobayashi	Aquathlon	Mixed relay	25 April
Bronze	Funa Yano	Beach wrestling	Women's 50 kg	28 April

== Aquathlon ==
Japan won a bronze medal in the aquathlon mixed relay.

Individual

Athlete	Event	Time						Rank
Athlete	Event	Run 1 (2.5 km)	Trans 1	Swim (1000 m)	Trans 2	Run 2 (2.5 km)	Total	Rank
Yuya Kobayashi	Men's	DNS						—N/a
Isaki Oku	Men's	7:25	0:35	12:08	0:21	8:28	28:57	4
Ikumi Seto	Women's	8:44	0:40	16:37	0:52	9:54	36:47	19
Mao Shimazaki	Women's	8:37	0:36	14:35	0:51	9:26	34:05	7

Relay

Athlete	Event	Time						Rank
Athlete	Event	Run 1 (2.5 km)	Trans 1	Swim (1000 m)	Trans 2	Run 2 (2.5 km)	Total group	Rank
Mao Shimazaki	Mixed Relay	4:03	0:35	6:47	0:47	4:28	16:40	—N/a
Isaki Oku	Mixed Relay	3:38	0:31	5:43	0:45	3:52	14:29	—N/a
Ikumi Seto	Mixed Relay	4:19	0:36	7:31	0:52	4:46	18:04	—N/a
Yuya Kobayashi	Mixed Relay	3:51	0:31	5:45	0:39	3:55	14:41	—N/a
Total	Mixed Relay	—N/a					1:03:54	3rd place, bronze medalist(s)
