= Sri Lanka at the 2026 Asian Beach Games =

- Flag of Sri Lanka
- IOC code: SRI
- NOC: National Olympic Committee of Sri Lanka
- Website: www.srilankaolympic.org

in Sanya, China 22 April 2026 – 30 April 2026
- Competitors: 77 (40 men and 37 women) in 8 sports
- Flag bearers (opening): Haren Wickramatillake & Lakshika Sugandhi
- Flag bearer (closing): Nipuni Wasana
- Medals Ranked 10th: Gold 1 Silver 2 Bronze 4 Total 7

Asian Beach Games appearances
- 2008; 2010; 2012; 2014; 2016; 2026

Sri Lanka competed at the 2026 Asian Beach Games in Sanya, China from 22 April to 30 April. This marked Sri Lanka's sixth appearance at the Asian Beach Games.

The Sri Lankan team consisted of 77 athletes (40 men and 37 women) competing in eight sports. The team also consisted of 32 officials. Sailor Haren Wickramatillake and athlete Lakshika Sugandhi were the country's flagbearers during the opening ceremony. Meanwhile wrestler Nipuni Wasana was the closing ceremony flagbearer.

Sri Lanka won its first ever gold and silver medals at an Asian Beach Games. Nipuni Wasana won the gold medal in the 50 kg beach wrestling event. Meanwhile beach athlete Samanmali Wickramsinha Arachchi and the women's kabaddi team won the silver medal in their respective events. Overall, the Sri Lankan delegation won seven medals, one gold, two silver and four bronze.

== Medalists ==
Medal	Name	Sport	Event	Date
Gold	Nipuni Pedige	Beach wrestling	Women's 50 kg	29 April
Silver	Samanmali Wickramsinha Arachchi	Beach athletics	Women's long jump	23 April
Silver	Diluxshana Vimalenthiran; Kajenthini Rasa; Kumuduni Bandara; Priyavarna Rasathurai; Madurika Hansamali; Shanika Sudarshani	Beach kabaddi	Women's tournament	27 April
Bronze	Shashikala Lankathilaka	Beach athletics	Women's long jump	23 April
Bronze	Jayathra Sampath Miranda	Beach athletics	Men's long jump	24 April
Bronze	Sadun Diyalawaththa; Pramuditha Silva; Malith Tharushan; Malith Thamel	Beach athletics	Men's 4 × 60 m relay	26 April
Bronze	Dilan Sanjaya; Ruwan Samarakoon; Aabith Aqar; Saminda Santhushta; Milinda Chathuranga; Mohammed Ansaf	Beach kabaddi	Men's tournament	26 April

== See also ==
- Sri Lanka at the 2026 Commonwealth Games
- Sri Lanka at the 2026 Asian Games
