= Hong Kong at the 2026 Asian Beach Games =

- IOC code: HKG
- NOC: Sports Federation and Olympic Committee of Hong Kong, China
- Website: www.hkolympic.org (in English)

in Sanya, China 22–30 April 2026
- Competitors: 84 in 8 sports
- Flag bearers: Nip Tsz Yin; Curtis Ho
- Medals Ranked =15th: Gold 0 Silver 2 Bronze 1 Total 3

Asian Beach Games appearances
- 2008; 2010; 2012; 2014; 2016; 2026

Hong Kong competed in the 2026 Asian Beach Games in Sanya, Hainan, China from 22 to 30 April 2026. This marks the return of the Asian Beach Games, ten years since the 2016 edition in Da Nang, Vietnam.

Hong Kong sent 84 athletes competing in eight sports. The flagbearers of Hong Kong for the opening ceremony are open water swimmer Nip Tsz Yin and windsurfer Curtis Ho.

Hong Kong won their first medal of the competition in the aquathlon mixed relay.

== Medalists ==
=== Silver ===
No.	Medal	Name	Sport	Event	Date
1	(silver) Silver	Bailee Brown; Wong Tsz-to; Hilda Choi; Mark Yu	Aquathlon	Mixed relay	25 Apr

=== Bronze ===
No.	Medal	Name	Sport	Event	Date
1	Bronze	Au Pak Sze; Chau Chun Fung; Aaron Chow; Hung Tsz Hin; Brian Mok; Lam Chi Wai; Lam Ho Tsun; Law Tsz Hin; Leung Sum Yi; Leung Chi Chung; Tang Ho Chung; Wong Ka Long; Wong Wai Kin; Yuen Cheuk Hang	Dragon boat	Men's 400 m	26 April

== Competitors ==
The following is the list of the number of competitors participating at the Games per sport/discipline.

Sport	Men	Women	Total
3x3 basketball	4	0	4
Aquathlon	3	2	5
Beach athletics	2	5	7
Beach handball	10	10	20
Dragon boat	14	14	28
Open water swimming	1	2	3
Sailing	1	2	3
Water polo	7	7	14
Total	42	42	84

== Aquathlon ==
Individual

Athlete	Event	Time						Rank
Athlete	Event	Run 1 (2.5 km)	Trans 1	Swim (1000 m)	Trans 2	Run 2 (2.5 km)	Total	Rank
Nick Yip	Men's	7:27	0:34	12:57	0:23	8:53	30:14	8
Mark Yu	Men's	7:26	0:33	12:24	0:21	8:54	29:38	6
Bailee Brown	Women's	8:38	0:40	13:49	0:49	9:41	33:37	5
Hilda Choi	Women's	8:43	0:36	14:05	0:52	10:02	34:18	8

Relay

Athlete	Event	Time						Rank
Athlete	Event	Run 1 (2.5 km)	Trans 1	Swim (1000 m)	Trans 2	Run 2 (2.5 km)	Total group	Rank
Bailee Brown	Mixed Relay	4:03	0:37	6:28	0:46	4:33	16:27	—N/a
Wong Tsz-to	Mixed Relay	3:41	0:33	5:53	0:47	3:46	14:40	—N/a
Hilda Choi	Mixed Relay	4:17	0:33	6:35	0:42	4:36	16:43	—N/a
Mark Yu	Mixed Relay	3:40	0:32	5:53	0:44	3:56	14:4	—N/a
Total	Mixed Relay	—N/a					1:02:35	2nd place, silver medalist(s)

== 3x3 basketball ==
Summary

Event	Group Stage				Qualifiers	Quarterfinals	Semifinals	Final / BM	
Event	Opposition Score	Opposition Score	Opposition Score	Rank	Opposition Score	Opposition Score	Opposition Score	Opposition Score	Rank
Men's team	Thailand –	Chinese Taipei –	Singapore –						

== Dragon boat ==
Men's tournament

Event	Heats		Semifinals		Final	
Event	Time	Rank	Time	Rank	Time	Rank
100 m	27.691	3 SF	26.480	4 MF	27.416	6
200 m	50.208	2 SF	49.743	3 MF	49.990	5
400 m	1:43.503	2 SF	1:37.415	2 GF	1:40.188	3rd place, bronze medalist(s)

Women's tournament

Event	Heats		Semifinals		Final	
Event	Time	Rank	Time	Rank	Time	Rank
100 m	29.814	3 SF	31.260	3 MF	31.367	5
200 m	58.328	3 SF	56.788	3 MF	56.882	5
400 m	1:55.479	2 SF	1:59.309	3 MF	1:58.000	5
