= 2026 Asian Beach Games =

Multi-sport event in Sanya, China

VI Asian Beach Games
- Host city: Sanya, China
- Motto: See Ya In Sanya! (Chinese: 久久不见久久见; pinyin: Jiǔjiǔ bùjiàn jiǔjiǔ jiàn; lit. 'Long time no see/We have not seen each other for a long time (thus) let's meet for a long time!')
- Nations: 45
- Athletes: 1,635
- Events: 62 in 14 sports
- Opening: 22 April 2026
- Closing: 30 April 2026
- Opened by: Shen Yiqin; State Councillor of China
- Ceremony venue: Yasha Park Ring Theater
- Website: en.sanya2026.cn

The 2026 Asian Beach Games (2026年亚洲沙滩运动会; 2026 nián yàzhōu shātān yùndònghuì), officially the Sixth Asian Beach Games (Chinese: 第六届亚洲沙滩运动会; pinyin: Dì liù jiè yàzhōu shātān yùndònghuì), and commonly known as Sanya 2026 (三亚2026), was a continental multi-sport event for beach sports which was held from 22 to 30 April 2026 in Sanya, China. Sanya was the second Chinese city to host the Asian Beach Games, after Haiyang in 2012.

Originally scheduled to be held from 28 November to 6 December 2020, on 10 August 2020, the Olympic Council of Asia announced that due to the COVID-19 pandemic, the Games would be postponed to 2–10 April 2021. But on 31 December, the OCA announced another postponement, with the new dates of the Games to be announced later "by consultation between the stakeholders". On 18 May 2025, the OCA announced that the sixth Asian Beach Games would take place from 22 to 30 April 2026. The event marks the return of the Asian Beach Games after 10-year hiatus since the 2016 edition in Da Nang, Vietnam.

== Development and preparation ==
=== Medals ===
The design for the Games' medals was unveiled on June 17, 2020. The inspiration for the design concept comes from an ancient Chinese poem "The bright moon rises above the sea, bringing us all together at this very moment".

The front of the medal is a circle symbolising the brilliance of the sun and the moon; within the circle is the emblem of the Games and the image of the Tianya rock formation representing the history and culture of Sanya, decorated the rest of the medal and depicts the natural scenery of Sanya – the sweeping bays, waves and beaches. The back of the medal features the Olympic Council of Asia logo, highlighted by the dragon, falcon and shining sun, and the side of the medal is engraved with the phrase "Welcome to Tianya Haijiao" in English.

=== Venues ===
Locations of the venues in Hainan Province. The host districts are circled in red.

The district of Tianya includes eight sports venues. It is home to the headquarters of the organizing committee, and the Sanya Phoenix International Airport. The district of Jiyang includes seven sports venues. It is also home to the athletes' village, built alongside a new sports complex featuring a 45,000 seat stadium.

- Sanya Bay Haihong Square - sailing
- Sanya Bay Haiyue Square Venue Cluster – beach kabaddi, open water swimming, water polo
- Phoenix Island – beach athletics
- Sanya Bay Yuhai Club Venue Cluster – beach soccer, beach wrestling, ju-jitsu, teqball
- Sanya Bay Photography Space - aquathlon
- Sanya River – dragon boat
- Sanya International Sports Center Gymnasium - 3x3 basketball
- Tianya Haijiao Venue Cluster – beach handball, beach volleyball, sport climbing
- Yasha Park Ring Theater – ceremonies

== Ceremonies ==
=== Opening ceremony ===
The opening ceremony for the 2026 Asian Beach Games was held at the Yasha Park on 22 April 2026. The event lasted around 75 minutes which had three themed chapters namely "Passion of Sea and Sky", "Dreams of the Deep Blue" and "Connecting the World". After the customary parade of nations, Chinese State Councilor Shen Yiqin officially declared the games open.

=== Closing ceremony ===
The 2026 Asian Beach Games closing ceremony was held on 30 April 2026. Philippine Olympic Committee president Abraham Tolentino received the Olympic Council of Asia flag signifying the Philippines role as host of the 2028 Asian Beach Games.

== The Games ==
=== Sports ===
On 11 April 2019, the Olympic Council of Asia initially announced that the Games would feature 93 events in 19 sports (22 disciplines), though three sports, ju-jitsu, teqball and beach woodball, were added later. In September 2025, the number of events was reduced to 63 in 14 sports (15 disciplines). Beach woodball, powerboat, powered paragliding and surfing were dropped. On March 23, 2026, organizers announced the women's beach soccer event had been dropped from the program due to low entries.

- 3x3 basketball (2)
- Aquatics
  - 4x4 water polo (2)
  - Open water swimming (3)
- Aquathlon (3)
- Beach athletics (10)
- Beach handball (2)
- Beach kabaddi (2)
- Beach soccer (1)
- Beach volleyball (2)
- Beach wrestling (8)
- Dragon boat (6)
- Ju-jitsu (6)
- Sailing (8)
- Sport climbing (4)
- Teqball (3)

== Calendar ==
All times and dates use China Standard Time (UTC+8).

OC	Opening ceremony	●	Event competitions	1	Event finals	CC	Closing ceremony

April 2026
April 2026		21 Tue	22 Wed	23 Thu	24 Fri	25 Sat	26 Sun	27 Mon	28 Tue	29 Wed	30 Thu	Events
Ceremonies			OC								CC	
3x3 basketball						●	●	●	●	2		2
Aquathlon				2		1						3
Aquatics
Aquatics	4x4 water polo		●	●	1	●	●	●	●	1		2
Aquatics	Open water swimming					1	1	1				3
Beach athletics					2	4	4					10
Beach handball		●		●	●		●	●	●	1	1	2
Beach kabaddi				●		●	●	2				2
Beach soccer				●		●	●	●		1		1
Beach volleyball				●	●	●	●	●	●	2		2
Beach wrestling									●	8		8
Dragon boat					2	2	2					6
Ju-jitsu				3	3							6
Sailing				●	●	●	●	4	4			8
Sport climbing									2	2		4
Teqball						●	●	3				3
Daily medal events		0	0	5	8	8	7	10	6	17	1	62
Cumulative total		0	0	5	13	21	28	38	44	61	62	62
April 2026
April 2026		21 Tue	22 Wed	23 Thu	24 Fri	25 Sat	26 Sun	27 Mon	28 Tue	29 Wed	30 Thu	Events

== Medal table ==
The top ten ranked NOCs at these Games are listed below.

* Host nation (China)

2026 Asian Beach Games Medal Table
Rank	Nation	Gold	Silver	Bronze	Total
1	China*	24	18	13	55
2	Thailand	10	9	9	28
3	Iran	9	1	0	10
4	Vietnam	3	5	5	13
5	Philippines	3	4	2	9
6	India	3	2	0	5
7	United Arab Emirates	2	2	2	6
8	Qatar	2	1	0	3
9	South Korea	1	4	5	10
10	Sri Lanka	1	2	4	7
11–31	Remaining NOCs	4	16	30	50
Totals (31 entries)		62	64	70	196

== Participation ==
All 45 National Olympic Committees who are members of the Olympic Council of Asia sent delegations.

Participating National Olympic Committees
- Afghanistan (4)
- Bahrain (20)
- Bangladesh (31)
- Bhutan (3)
- Brunei (4)
- Cambodia (18)
- China (170) (hosts)
- Hong Kong (84)
- India (31)
- Indonesia (22)
- Iran (57)
- Iraq (4)
- Japan (27)
- Jordan (24)
- Kazakhstan (70)
- Kuwait (13)
- Kyrgyzstan (40)
- Laos (18)
- Lebanon (8)
- Macau (45)
- Malaysia (33)
- Maldives (27)
- Mongolia (51)
- Myanmar (6)
- Nepal (10)
- North Korea (6)
- Oman (32)
- Pakistan (27)
- Palestine (19)
- Philippines (101)
- Qatar (36)
- Saudi Arabia (27)
- Singapore (32)
- South Korea (60)
- Sri Lanka (77)
- Syria (28)
- Chinese Taipei (71)
- Tajikistan (10)
- Thailand (175)
- Timor-Leste (4)
- Turkmenistan (10)
- United Arab Emirates (31)
- Uzbekistan (19)
- Vietnam (53)
- Yemen (6)

== Marketing ==
=== Logo ===
The emblem features blue, green, yellow and orange colour blocks shaped into the number 6 to represent the sixth edition of the Asian Beach Games.

The image of a coconut tree leaves, an athlete and the deer statue at Luhuitou Park combines the concept of ocean, beach, sport and the tropical landscape together with the symbol of Sanya city.

The English slogan "See Ya in Sanya!" is a catchphrase for visitors from around the world. It represents the relaxed and family-oriented concept of the beach and sea sports festival.

=== Mascot ===
The mascot of the games is called Yaya (亚亚), who is an eld's deer in beach clothing. The first character of the name comes from Sanya (三亚), and the second one from Yazhou (亚洲), which is the Chinese word for Asia, representing the dynamic, interconnected and inter-dependent relationship among Sanya, Asia and other parts of the world.

== See also ==
- 2012 Asian Beach Games
- 2026 Asian Games

Preceded by Da Nang	Asian Beach Games; Sanya	Succeeded by Cebu
