= Dragon boat at the 2026 Asian Beach Games =

- Venue: Sanya River
- Dates: 24–26 April 2026

The Dragon boat competition at the 2026 Asian Beach Games took place in Sanya, China from 24 to 26 April 2026. The venue was the segment of the Sanya River from the Xinfeng Bridge to Qingren Bridge. A total of 166 athletes from 7 nations participated.

== Medalists ==
=== Men ===
Event	Gold	Silver	Bronze
100 m	China; Deng Zhifang; Feng Jiadong; Guo Biao; Li Guisen; Li Qixu; Li Yupeng; Li Zhanhong; Pi Jianxin; Su Yongqi; Wen Guanglun; Wu Hao; Zhao Zhian; Zhou Guichao; Zhu Jinglin	Thailand; Sukon Boonem; Chaiyakarn Choochuen; Teerasak Chuden; Nattapon Kaewsri; Pornprom Kramsuk; Suwan Kwanthong; Danusorn Makkawal; Sukrit Rakkarn; Krittapat Samueangsri; Phatthara Sangdet; Nopphadol Sangthuang; Chetsadaporn Simma; Suriya Somrak; Pornchai Tesdee	Chinese Taipei; Chang Yu-chen; Chen Tzu-hsien; Chen Tzu-hsin; Chen Yu-ming; Chien Cheng-yen; Chuang Ying-chieh; Hsu Cheng-wei; Huang Hao-yu; Lee Cheng-yi; Lee Chun-lin; Lin Sheng-ru; Lu En; Lu Hung-chang; Wu Chen-po
200 m	Thailand; Sukon Boonem; Chaiyakarn Choochuen; Teerasak Chuden; Nattapon Kaewsri; Pornprom Kramsuk; Suwan Kwanthong; Danusorn Makkawal; Sukrit Rakkarn; Krittapat Samueangsri; Phatthara Sangdet; Nopphadol Sangthuang; Chetsadaporn Simma; Suriya Somrak; Pornchai Tesdee	China; Deng Zhifang; Feng Jiadong; Guo Biao; Li Guisen; Li Qixu; Li Yupeng; Li Zhanhong; Pi Jianxin; Su Yongqi; Wen Guanglun; Wu Hao; Zhao Zhian; Zhou Guichao; Zhu Jinglin	Chinese Taipei; Chang Yu-chen; Chen Tzu-hsien; Chen Tzu-hsin; Chen Yu-ming; Chien Cheng-yen; Chuang Ying-chieh; Hsu Cheng-wei; Huang Hao-yu; Lee Cheng-yi; Lee Chun-lin; Lin Sheng-ru; Lu En; Lu Hung-chang; Wu Chen-po
400 m	China; Deng Zhifang; Feng Jiadong; Guo Biao; Li Guisen; Li Qixu; Li Yupeng; Li Zhanhong; Pi Jianxin; Su Yongqi; Wen Guanglun; Wu Hao; Zhao Zhian; Zhou Guichao; Zhu Jinglin	Thailand; Sukon Boonem; Chaiyakarn Choochuen; Teerasak Chuden; Nattapon Kaewsri; Pornprom Kramsuk; Suwan Kwanthong; Danusorn Makkawal; Sukrit Rakkarn; Krittapat Samueangsri; Phatthara Sangdet; Nopphadol Sangthuang; Chetsadaporn Simma; Suriya Somrak; Pornchai Tesdee	Hong Kong; Au Pak Sze; Chau Chun Fung; Aaron Chow; Hung Tsz Hin; Lam Chi Wai; Lam Ho Tsun; Law Tsz Hin; Leung Chi Chung; Leung Sum Yi; Brian Mok; Tang Ho Chung; Wong Ka Long; Wong Wai Kin; Yuen Cheuk Hang

=== Women ===
Event	Gold	Silver	Bronze
100 m	China; Cai Xintong; Cui Lu; Fan Qingqing; Guan Peishi; Hu Xiao; Li Wen; Lin Lin; Liu Xuelian; Ou Shihua; Qi Lala; Sun Shijie; Yang Lizhi; Zhang Xiaofang; Zhou Jialu	Vietnam; Bùi Thị Yến; Diệp Thị Thúy; Hồ Thị Ne; Lê Thị Lan Anh; Lê Thị Phương Minh; Lý Thị Thủy; Ma Thị Thương; Ma Thị Thủy; Mạc Thị Thanh Thủy; Nguyễn Thị Hải Anh; Nguyễn Thị Lợi; Nguyễn Thị Tâm; Phùng Thị Ngọc Diễm; Vũ Thị Ngọc Uyên	Thailand; Peerada Armart; Jaruwan Chaikan; Atcharaporn Duanglawa; Karnpitcha Kanachart; Praewpan Kawsri; Thatsanee Khomkham; Pranchalee Moonkasem; Sayawadee Ngaosri; Nipaporn Nopsri; Khwanchanok Saeheng; Vipavas Sangthong; Onuma Teeranaew; Karaked Thaenkaew; Nootchanat Thoongpong
200 m	China; Cai Xintong; Cui Lu; Fan Qingqing; Guan Peishi; Hu Xiao; Li Wen; Lin Lin; Liu Xuelian; Ou Shihua; Qi Lala; Sun Shijie; Yang Lizhi; Zhang Xiaofang; Zhou Jialu	Thailand; Peerada Armart; Jaruwan Chaikan; Atcharaporn Duanglawa; Karnpitcha Kanachart; Praewpan Kawsri; Thatsanee Khomkham; Pranchalee Moonkasem; Sayawadee Ngaosri; Nipaporn Nopsri; Khwanchanok Saeheng; Vipavas Sangthong; Onuma Teeranaew; Karaked Thaenkaew; Nootchanat Thoongpong	Vietnam; Bùi Thị Yến; Diệp Thị Thúy; Hồ Thị Ne; Lê Thị Lan Anh; Lê Thị Phương Minh; Lý Thị Thủy; Ma Thị Thương; Ma Thị Thủy; Mạc Thị Thanh Thủy; Nguyễn Thị Hải Anh; Nguyễn Thị Lợi; Nguyễn Thị Tâm; Phùng Thị Ngọc Diễm; Vũ Thị Ngọc Uyên
400 m	China; Cai Xintong; Cui Lu; Fan Qingqing; Guan Peishi; Hu Xiao; Li Wen; Lin Lin; Liu Xuelian; Ou Shihua; Qi Lala; Sun Shijie; Yang Lizhi; Zhang Xiaofang; Zhou Jialu	Thailand; Peerada Armart; Jaruwan Chaikan; Atcharaporn Duanglawa; Karnpitcha Kanachart; Praewpan Kawsri; Thatsanee Khomkham; Pranchalee Moonkasem; Sayawadee Ngaosri; Nipaporn Nopsri; Khwanchanok Saeheng; Vipavas Sangthong; Onuma Teeranaew; Karaked Thaenkaew; Nootchanat Thoongpong	Vietnam; Bùi Thị Yến; Diệp Thị Thúy; Hồ Thị Ne; Lê Thị Lan Anh; Lê Thị Phương Minh; Lý Thị Thủy; Ma Thị Thương; Ma Thị Thủy; Mạc Thị Thanh Thủy; Nguyễn Thị Hải Anh; Nguyễn Thị Lợi; Nguyễn Thị Tâm; Phùng Thị Ngọc Diễm; Vũ Thị Ngọc Uyên

== Medal table ==
Rank	Nation	Gold	Silver	Bronze	Total
1	China (CHN)	5	1	0	6
2	Thailand (THA)	1	4	1	6
3	Vietnam (VIE)	0	1	2	3
4	Chinese Taipei (TPE)	0	0	2	2
5	Hong Kong (HKG)	0	0	1	1
Totals (5 entries)		6	6	6	18

== Results ==
=== Men ===
==== 100 m ====
24 April

===== Heats =====
Rank	Team	Time
Heat 1
1	Thailand	24.806
2	Philippines	25.523
3	Macau	28.174
Heat 2
1	China	24.555
2	Chinese Taipei	25.137
3	Hong Kong	27.691

===== Semifinal =====
Rank	Team	Time
1	Chinese Taipei	25.950
2	Macau	26.040
3	Philippines	26.334
4	Hong Kong	26.480

===== Finals =====
Rank	Team	Time
Grand final
1st place, gold medalist(s)	China	24.076
2nd place, silver medalist(s)	Thailand	24.210
3rd place, bronze medalist(s)	Chinese Taipei	24.938
4	Macau	25.960
Minor final
5	Philippines	26.958
6	Hong Kong	27.416

==== 200 m ====
25 April

===== Heats =====
Rank	Team	Time
Heat 1
1	China	46.576
2	Thailand	47.434
3	Chinese Taipei	52.486
Heat 2
1	Macau	48.411
2	Hong Kong	50.208
3	Philippines	50.228

===== Semifinal =====
Rank	Team	Time
1	Chinese Taipei	49.072
2	Thailand	49.174
3	Hong Kong	49.743
4	Philippines	51.224

===== Finals =====
Rank	Team	Time
Grand final
1st place, gold medalist(s)	Thailand	45.500
2nd place, silver medalist(s)	China	45.801
3rd place, bronze medalist(s)	Chinese Taipei	47.972
4	Macau	48.244
Minor final
5	Hong Kong	49.990
6	Philippines	52.118

==== 400 m ====
26 April

===== Heats =====
Rank	Team	Time
Heat 1
1	Thailand	1:39.293
2	Hong Kong	1:43.503
3	Chinese Taipei	1:46.090
Heat 2
1	China	1:37.884
2	Philippines	1:39.504
3	Macau	1:51.160

===== Semifinal =====
Rank	Team	Time
1	Chinese Taipei	1:36.192
2	Hong Kong	1:37.415
3	Philippines	1:41.146
4	Macau	1:45.069

===== Finals =====
Rank	Team	Time
Grand final
1st place, gold medalist(s)	China	1:34.990
2nd place, silver medalist(s)	Thailand	1:35.614
3rd place, bronze medalist(s)	Hong Kong	1:40.188
4	Chinese Taipei	1:40.210
Minor final
5	Philippines	1:40.889
6	Macau	1:48.524

=== Women ===
==== 100 m ====
24 April

===== Heats =====
Rank	Team	Time
Heat 1
1	Thailand	28.102
2	Chinese Taipei	29.048
3	Hong Kong	29.814
Heat 2
1	China	26.562
2	Vietnam	27.988
3	Macau	31.286

===== Semifinal =====
Rank	Team	Time
1	Chinese Taipei	29.631
2	Vietnam	29.897
3	Hong Kong	31.260
4	Macau	31.637

===== Finals =====
Rank	Team	Time
Grand final
1st place, gold medalist(s)	China	28.260
2nd place, silver medalist(s)	Vietnam	28.516
3rd place, bronze medalist(s)	Thailand	29.631
4	Chinese Taipei	30.740
Minor final
5	Hong Kong	31.367
6	Macau	31.595

==== 200 m ====
25 April

===== Heats =====
Rank	Team	Time
Heat 1
1	China	54.375
2	Thailand	56.012
3	Hong Kong	58.328
Heat 2
1	Vietnam	52.394
2	Chinese Taipei	57.731
3	Macau	58.969

===== Semifinal =====
Rank	Team	Time
1	Thailand	55.925
2	Macau	56.688
3	Hong Kong	56.788
4	Chinese Taipei	56.803

===== Finals =====
Rank	Team	Time
Grand final
1st place, gold medalist(s)	China	51.964
2nd place, silver medalist(s)	Thailand	54.748
3rd place, bronze medalist(s)	Vietnam	54.839
4	Macau	57.841
Minor final
5	Hong Kong	56.882
6	Chinese Taipei	1:00.351

==== 400 m ====
26 April

===== Heats =====
Rank	Team	Time
Heat 1
1	China	1:46.297
2	Vietnam	1:52.998
3	Thailand	1:56.919
Heat 2
1	Macau	1:54.105
2	Hong Kong	1:55.479
3	Chinese Taipei	1:56.016

===== Semifinal =====
Rank	Team	Time
1	Vietnam	1:54.295
2	Thailand	1:56.768
3	Hong Kong	1:59.309
4	Chinese Taipei	1:59.739

===== Finals =====
Rank	Team	Time
Grand final
1st place, gold medalist(s)	China	1:48.899
2nd place, silver medalist(s)	Thailand	1:51.704
3rd place, bronze medalist(s)	Vietnam	1:53.098
4	Macau	2:05.439
Minor final
5	Hong Kong	1:58.000
6	Chinese Taipei	2:02.075
