= Teqball at the 2026 Asian Beach Games =

- Venue: Yuhai Club
- Dates: 25–27 April 2026

The Teqball competition at the 2026 Asian Beach Games was held in Sanya, China from 25 to 27 April 2026 at the Sanya Bay Yuhai Club. Teqball was added to the Asian Beach Games for the very first time. It is the first adult teqball tournament at an Asian level. The tournament was played with the Teqball table placed on a sandy surface. Thailand swept all three events.

The competition was played as the best-of-three sets and a set was won by the first side to reach 12 points. The final decisive set must be won by at least a two-point margin.

== Medalists ==
Event	Gold	Silver	Bronze
Men's doubles	Thailand; Jirati Chanliang; Sorrasak Thaosiri	Iraq; Ali Jalil; Abdul-Rahman Ahmed	Lebanon; Mohamad Hafez; Ahmad Arabi
Men's doubles	Thailand; Jirati Chanliang; Sorrasak Thaosiri	Iraq; Ali Jalil; Abdul-Rahman Ahmed	Myanmar; Saw Friday; Si Thu Tun
Women's doubles	Thailand; Areeya Homdee; Jutatip Kuntatong	North Korea; Kim Hyo-gyong; Cha Sol-gyong	Myanmar; Naing Naing Win; Hsu Mon Aung
Women's doubles	Thailand; Areeya Homdee; Jutatip Kuntatong	North Korea; Kim Hyo-gyong; Cha Sol-gyong	Cambodia; Mey Sreymeas; Yorn Sophornraksmey
Mixed doubles	Thailand; Phakpong Dejaroen; Suphawadi Wongkhamchan	North Korea; Han Song; Kim Il-sin	Myanmar; Ko Ko Lwin; Khin Hnin Wai
Mixed doubles	Thailand; Phakpong Dejaroen; Suphawadi Wongkhamchan	North Korea; Han Song; Kim Il-sin	China; Mao Zheming; Gong Fulei

== Medal table ==
Rank	Nation	Gold	Silver	Bronze	Total
1	Thailand (THA)	3	0	0	3
2	North Korea (PRK)	0	2	0	2
3	Iraq (IRQ)	0	1	0	1
4	Myanmar (MYA)	0	0	3	3
5	Cambodia (CAM)	0	0	1	1
5	China (CHN)	0	0	1	1
5	Lebanon (LBN)	0	0	1	1
Totals (7 entries)		3	3	6	12

== Results ==
=== Men's doubles ===
==== Preliminary round ====
26 April

Group A
Pos	Team	Pld	W	L	Pts	THA	MYA	CAM
1	Jirati Chanliang (THA) Sorrasak Thaosiri (THA)	2	2	0	4	—	2–0	2–0
2	Saw Friday (MYA) Si Thu Tun (MYA)	2	1	1	3	6, 5	—	2–0
3	Soun Ravi (CAM) Nak Ratana (CAM)	2	0	2	2	2, 7	6, 3	—

Group B
Pos	Team	Pld	W	L	Pts	CHN	VIE	MAS
1	Sun Zhixu (CHN) Zhang Junming (CHN)	2	2	0	4	—	2–0	2–0
2	Bá Trường Giang (VIE) Lê Anh Khoa (VIE)	2	1	1	3	10, 11	—	2–0
3	Rahmat Tiarareza (MAS) Amirul Danish (MAS)	2	0	2	2	11, 5	1, 10	—

Group C
Pos	Team	Pld	W	L	Pts	IRQ	PRK	BRU
1	Ali Jalil (IRQ) Abdul-Rahman Ahmed (IRQ)	2	2	0	4	—	2–0	2–0
2	Ri Kun-dok (PRK) Kim Chol-myong (PRK)	2	1	1	3	6, 6	—	2–0
3	Hanis Hidayatullah Abdullah (BRU) Ismail Ang (BRU)	2	0	2	2	4, 6	7, 8	—

Group D
Pos	Team	Pld	W	L	Pts	LBN	LAO	PHI
1	Mohamad Hafez (LBN) Ahmad Arabi (LBN)	2	2	0	4	—	2–0	2–0
2	Chaitavanh Inthalapheth (LAO) Phonesavanh Phimmachack (LAO)	2	1	1	3	9, 5	—	2–0
3	Prince Agustin (PHI) Anel Pacis (PHI)	2	0	2	2	6, 7	9, 9	—

Source: FITEQ

==== Knockout round ====
Quarterfinals; 26 April
Jirati Chanliang (THA); Sorrasak Thaosiri (THA)	12	12
Ri Kun-dok (PRK); Kim Chol-myong (PRK)	4	10
Bá Trường Giang (VIE); Lê Anh Khoa (VIE)	8	4
Mohamad Hafez (LBN); Ahmad Arabi (LBN)	12	12
Ali Jalil (IRQ); Abdul-Rahman Ahmed (IRQ)	12	12
Chaitavanh Inthalapheth (LAO); Phonesavanh Phimmachack (LAO)	5	8
Saw Friday (MYA); Si Thu Tun (MYA)	12	11	12
Sun Zhixu (CHN); Zhang Junming (CHN)	9	12	9

Semifinals; 26 April
Jirati Chanliang (THA); Sorrasak Thaosiri (THA)	12	12
Mohamad Hafez (LBN); Ahmad Arabi (LBN)	8	10
Ali Jalil (IRQ); Abdul-Rahman Ahmed (IRQ)	12	8	16
Saw Friday (MYA); Si Thu Tun (MYA)	5	12	14

Final; 27 April
Jirati Chanliang (THA); Sorrasak Thaosiri (THA)	12	9	12
Ali Jalil (IRQ); Abdul-Rahman Ahmed (IRQ)	7	12	3

=== Women's doubles ===
==== Preliminary round ====
25 April

Group A
Pos	Team	Pld	W	L	Pts	THA	CAM	VIE	LAO	KUW
1	Areeya Homdee (THA) Jutatip Kuntatong (THA)	4	4	0	8	—	2–0	2–0	2–0	2–0
2	Mey Sreymeas (CAM) Yorn Sophornraksmey (CAM)	4	3	1	7	2, 2	—	2–1	2–0	2–0
3	Trịnh Gia Nghi (VIE) Nguyễn Thị Thu Hoài (VIE)	4	2	2	6	2, 1	7, −9, 8	—	2–0	2–0
4	Moukda Chaleunsouk (LAO) Tomvai Phommyvong (LAO)	4	1	3	5	1, 4	8, 9	5, 6	—	2–0
5	Hessah Al-Failakawi (KUW) Shahad Al-Mansour (KUW)	4	0	4	4	4, 2	5, 3	2, 2	7, 2	—

Group B
Pos	Team	Pld	W	L	Pts	PRK	MYA	CHN	IRQ	PHI
1	Kim Hyo-gyong (PRK) Cha Sol-gyong (PRK)	4	4	0	8	—	2–0	2–0	2–0	2–0
2	Naing Naing Win (MYA) Hsu Mon Aung (MYA)	4	3	1	7	10, 11	—	2–0	2–0	2–0
3	Shi Huhong (CHN) Cui Yazhen (CHN)	4	2	2	6	8, 5	5, 10	—	2–0	2–0
4	Samah Shakir (IRQ) Batool Sadeq (IRQ)	4	1	3	5	7, 7	9, 3	7, 6	—	2–0
5	Crystal Cariño (PHI) Joellene Cruz (PHI)	4	0	4	4	4, 5	4, 2	1, 5	3, 7	—

Source: FITEQ

==== Knockout round ====
Semifinals; 25 April			Final; 27 April
Areeya Homdee (THA); Jutatip Kuntatong (THA)	12	12
Naing Naing Win (MYA); Hsu Mon Aung (MYA)	5	5	Areeya Homdee (THA); Jutatip Kuntatong (THA)	12	12
Kim Hyo-gyong (PRK); Cha Sol-gyong (PRK)	12	12	Kim Hyo-gyong (PRK); Cha Sol-gyong (PRK)	8	3
Mey Sreymeas (CAM); Yorn Sophornraksmey (CAM)	7	8

=== Mixed doubles ===
==== Preliminary round ====
26 April

Group A
Pos	Team	Pld	W	L	Pts	THA	PRK	KUW
1	Phakpong Dejaroen (THA) Suphawadi Wongkhamchan (THA)	2	2	0	4	—	2–0	2–0
2	Han Song (PRK) Kim Il-sin (PRK)	2	1	1	3	6, 4	—	2–0
3	Salman Al-Ibrahim (KUW) Hessah Al-Failakawi (KUW)	2	0	2	2	2, 3	4, 7	—

Group B
Pos	Team	Pld	W	L	Pts	VIE	IRQ	LAO
1	Nguyễn Hoàng Minh Tân (VIE) Trịnh Gia Nghi (VIE)	2	2	0	4	—	2–1	2–1
2	Ali Jalil (IRQ) Samah Shakir (IRQ)	2	1	1	3	−6, 10, 8	—	2–0
3	Alisa Phomsouliya (LAO) Seng Phonexay (LAO)	2	0	2	2	−11, 3, 10	5, 3	—

Group C
Pos	Team	Pld	W	L	Pts	CHN	CAM	PHI
1	Mao Zheming (CHN) Gong Fulei (CHN)	2	2	0	4	—	2–0	2–0
2	Bun Thuonvireak (CAM) Dy Koemyean (CAM)	2	1	1	3	9, 10	—	2–0
3	Klyde Polca (PHI) Nicole Tabucol (PHI)	2	0	2	2	1, 2	4, 3	—

Group D
Pos	Team	Pld	W	L	Pts	MYA	LBN	MGL
1	Ko Ko Lwin (MYA) Khin Hnin Wai (MYA)	2	2	0	4	—	2–0	2–0
2	Mohamad Hafez (LBN) Kamar Dandal (LBN)	2	1	1	3	5, 9	—	2–0
3	Nominchimegiin Tsetsenberkh (MGL) Battsoodoliin Myagmarsüren (MGL)	2	0	2	2	1, 4	4, 1	—

Source: FITEQ

==== Knockout round ====
Quarterfinals; 26 April			Semifinals; 26 April			Final; 27 April
Phakpong Dejaroen (THA); Suphawadi Wongkhamchan (THA)	12	12
Ali Jalil (IRQ); Samah Shakir (IRQ)	6	10	Phakpong Dejaroen (THA); Suphawadi Wongkhamchan (THA)	12	12
Bun Thuonvireak (CAM); Dy Koemyean (CAM)	10	5	Ko Ko Lwin (MYA); Khin Hnin Wai (MYA)	7	11
Ko Ko Lwin (MYA); Khin Hnin Wai (MYA)	12	12				Phakpong Dejaroen (THA); Suphawadi Wongkhamchan (THA)	12	12
Mao Zheming (CHN); Gong Fulei (CHN)	12	12				Han Song (PRK); Kim Il-sin (PRK)	6	10
Mohamad Hafez (LBN); Kamar Dandal (LBN)	9	10	Mao Zheming (CHN); Gong Fulei (CHN)	8	3
Han Song (PRK); Kim Il-sin (PRK)	12	12	Han Song (PRK); Kim Il-sin (PRK)	12	12
Nguyễn Hoàng Minh Tân (VIE); Trịnh Gia Nghi (VIE)	8	8
