= Philippines at the 2026 Asian Beach Games =

- IOC code: PHI
- NOC: Philippine Olympic Committee
- Website: www.olympic.ph (in English)

in Sanya, China 22–30 April 2026
- Competitors: 101 in 11 sports
- Flag bearers (opening): Annie Ramirez; Yman Xavier Baluyo
- Flag bearer (closing): Simeon Gabriel Bejar
- Medals Ranked 5th: Gold 3 Silver 4 Bronze 2 Total 9

Asian Beach Games appearances
- 2008; 2010; 2012; 2014; 2016; 2026

The Philippines competed at the 2026 Asian Beach Games in Sanya, China from 22 to 30 April 2026. This marks the return of the Asian Beach Games, ten years since the 2016 edition in Da Nang, Vietnam.

The delegation will have 101 athletes. The Philippines has among the top five largest delegation to the games. The campaign started on 21 April 2026 with the beach handball team playing its first game one day prior to the opening ceremony.

Jiu-jitsu athletes Annie Ramirez and Yman Xavier Baluyo were the flagbearers in the opening ceremony.

After the closing ceremony, handball athlete Simeon Gabriel Bejar was the flagbearer. China also turned over the hosting rights of the Asian Beach Games to the Philippines. Cebu will host the 2028 edition.

== Medalists ==
=== Gold ===
No.	Medal	Name	Sport	Event	Date
1	Gold	Alex Enriquez	Ju-jitsu	Women's Ne-waza −63kg	23 Apr
2	Gold	Leonard Grospe	Beach Athletics	Men's High Jump	24 Apr
3	Gold	Annie Ramirez	Ju-jitsu	Women's Ne-waza −57kg	24 Apr

=== Silver ===
No.	Medal	Name	Sport	Event	Date
1	(silver) Silver	Emily Rosalynn Thomas	Ju-jitsu	Women's ne-waza −57kg	24 Apr
2	(silver) Silver	Kristina Knott; Jessica Laurance; Lianne Diana Pama; Shane Joy Ponce	Beath athletics	Women's 4 × 60 m relay	26 Apr
3	(silver) Silver	Dhenver Castillo	Sailing	Foil Windsurfing Boys	27 Apr
4	(silver) Silver	Gabi Bade; Mikka Cacho; Tantoy Ferrer; Kaye Pingol	3x3 basketball	Women's team	29 Apr

=== Bronze ===
No.	Medal	Name	Sport	Event	Date
1	Bronze	Kaila Napolis	Ju-jitsu	Women's Ne-waza −52kg	23 Apr
2	Bronze	Jessica Laurance	Beach Athletics	Women's 60 m	25 Apr

== Medal summary ==
=== By sports ===
Sport	1st place, gold medalist(s)	2nd place, silver medalist(s)	3rd place, bronze medalist(s)	Total
3x3 basketball	0	1	0	1
Ju-jitsu	2	1	1	4
Beach Athletics	1	1	1	3
Sailing	0	1	0	1
Total	3	4	2	9

=== By date ===
Medals by date
Date	1st place, gold medalist(s)	2nd place, silver medalist(s)	3rd place, bronze medalist(s)	Total
23 April	1	0	1	2
24 April	2	1	0	3
25 April	0	0	1	1
26 April	0	1	0	1
27 April	0	1	0	0
28 April	0	0	0	0
29 April	0	1	0	1
30 April	0	0	0	0
Total	3	4	2	9

== Competitors ==
The following is the list of the number of competitors participating at the Games per sport/discipline.

Sport	Men	Women	Total
3x3 basketball	4	4	8
Aquathlon	3	2	5
Beach athletics	2	5	7
Beach handball	10	10	20
Beach volleyball	0	4	4
Beach wrestling	4	2	6
Dragon boat	14	0	14
Ju-jitsu	6	6	12
Sailing	7	5	12
Sport climbing	4	3	7
Teqball	3	3	6
Total	57	44	101

== Aquathlon ==
Individual

Athlete	Event	Time						Rank
Athlete	Event	Run 1 (2.5 km)	Trans 1	Swim (1000 m)	Trans 2	Run 2 (2.5 km)	Total	Rank
Matthew Hermosa	Men's	7:50	0:39	15:17	0:21	9:11	33:18	18
Kim Remolino	Men's	7:28	0:32	13:06	0:21	8:34	30:01	7
Raven Alcoseba	Women's	9:25	0:43	14:19	0:52	10:04	35:23	15
Erika Burgos	Women's	8:59	0:37	15:02	0:47	9:44	35:09	13

Relay

Athlete	Event	Time						Rank
Athlete	Event	Run 1 (2.5 km)	Trans 1	Swim (1000 m)	Trans 2	Run 2 (2.5 km)	Total group	Rank
Raven Alcoseba	Mixed Relay	4:18	0:35	6:46	0:49	4:40	17:08	—N/a
Emil Lorbes	Mixed Relay	3:54	0:38	6:16	0:44	4:15	15:47	—N/a
Erika Burgos	Mixed Relay	4:22	0:35	7:02	0:48	4:41	17:28	—N/a
Kim Remolino	Mixed Relay	3:44	0:29	6:15	0:39	3:56	15:03	—N/a
Total	Mixed Relay	—N/a					1:05:26	5

== 3x3 basketball ==
The Philippines entered both its men's and women's 3x3 basketball teams.

Summary

Event	Group Stage				Qualifiers	Quarterfinals	Semifinals	Final / BM	
Event	Opposition Score	Opposition Score	Opposition Score	Rank	Opposition Score	Opposition Score	Opposition Score	Opposition Score	Rank
Men's team	China; W 21–18	Macau; W 21–18	Iran; L 14–21	1 Q	Bye	India; W 18–4	Thailand; L 18–20	China; L 13–21	4
Women's team	Indonesia; W 15–11	Macau; W 21–9	Kyrgyzstan; W 21–15	1 Q	Bye	Kazakhstan; W 16–11	Singapore; W 20–13	China; L 13–21	2nd place, silver medalist(s)

=== Men's tournament ===
Team roster

- Nic Cabañero
- Gelo Crisostomo
- Jeff Manday
- Aldous Torculas

Preliminary rounds – Group A

Pos	Team	Pld	W	L	PF	PA	PD
1	Philippines	3	2	1	56	57	−1
2	Iran	3	2	1	55	37	+18
3	China	3	2	1	53	43	+10
4	Macau	3	0	3	36	63	−27

Source: FIBA

25 April
11:25

Report

China	18–21	Philippines
Pts: Yan 7		Pts: Cabañero 9

Sports Centre Gymnasium, Sanya
Referees: Quinn (INA), Dale (NZL)

25 April
13:05

Report

Philippines	21–18	Macau
Pts: Cabañero 7		Pts: Ho 7

Sports Centre Gymnasium, Sanya
Referees: Nozaki (JPN), Dale (NZL)

27 April
11:50

Report

Philippines	14–21	Iran
Pts: Manday 9		Pts: Rahimi 8

Sports Centre Gymnasium, Sanya
Referees: Quinn (INA), Dale (NZL)

Quarterfinals

28 April
17:10

Report

Philippines	18–14	India
Pts: Cabañero 7		Pts: Dagar 6

Sports Centre Gymnasium, Sanya
Referees: Dale (NZL), Cong (CHN)

Semifinals

29 April
14:50

Report

Philippines	18–20	Thailand
Pts: Cabañero 9		Pts: Franco 9

Sports Centre Gymnasium, Sanya
Referees: Cong (CHN), Dale (NZL)

Bronze medal match

29 April
18:30

Report

Philippines	13–21	China
Pts: Cabañero, Crisostomo, Manday 4		Pts: Ma 7

Sports Centre Gymnasium, Sanya
Referees: Dale (NZL), Nagoshi (JPN)

=== Women's tournament ===
Team roster

- Gabi Bade
- Mikka Cacho
- Tantoy Ferrer
- Kaye Pingol

Preliminary rounds – Group C

Pos	Team	Pld	W	L	PF	PA	PD
1	Philippines	3	3	0	57	35	+22
2	Indonesia	3	2	1	44	38	+6
3	Macau	3	1	2	35	49	−14
4	Kyrgyzstan	3	0	3	37	51	−14

Source: FIBA

25 April
16:20

Report

Philippines	15–11	Indonesia
Pts: Cacho 5		Pts: Nurfadillah 6

Sports Centre Gymnasium, Sanya
Referees: Chen (TPE), Nagoshi (JPN)

25 April
18:00

Report

Macau	9–21	Philippines
Pts: Chan 5		Pts: Ferrer 8

Sports Centre Gymnasium, Sanya
Referees: Chan (HKG), Chen (TPE)

27 April
12:15

Report

Philippines	21–15	Kyrgyzstan
Pts: Ferrer 8		Pts: Mazikina 8

Sports Centre Gymnasium, Sanya
Referees: Chan (HKG), Leong (SGP)

Quarterfinals

28 April
18:00

Report

Philippines	16–11	Kazakhstan
Pts: Ferrer 6		Pts: Yerkebay 4

Sports Centre Gymnasium, Sanya
Referees: Chan (HKG), Cong (CHN)

Semifinals

29 April
14:25

Report

Philippines	20–13	Singapore
Pts: Cacho 8		Pts: Lai, Ang 4

Sports Centre Gymnasium, Sanya
Referees: Kim (KOR), Laosaksam (THA)

Gold medal match

29 April
19:00

Report

China	21–13	Philippines
Pts: Yang 7		Pts: Cacho 5

Sports Centre Gymnasium, Sanya
Referees: Nozaki (JPN), Dale (NZL)

== Beach athletics ==
Track

Athlete	Event	Heat		Final	
Athlete	Event	Time	Rank	Time	Rank
Pi Durden Wangkay	Men's 60 m	7.14	6	Did not advance	
Lianne Diana Pama	Women's 60 m	7.75	3	Did not advance	
Jessica Laurance	Women's 60 m	7.50	1 Q	7.52	3rd place, bronze medalist(s)
Kristina Knott; Jessica Laurance; Lianne Diana Pama; Shane Joy Ponce	Women's 4 × 60 m relay	—N/a		29.73	2nd place, silver medalist(s)

Field

Athlete	Event	Final	
Athlete	Event	Result	Rank
Leonard Grospe	Men's high jump	2.05	1st place, gold medalist(s)
Mariel Abuan	Women's high jump	1.60	6

== Beach handball ==
Summary

Event	Group Stage						Semifinals	Final / BM	
Event	Opposition Score	Opposition Score	Opposition Score	Opposition Score	Opposition Score	Rank	Opposition Score	Opposition Score	Rank
Men's team	Hong Kong; W 2–0	Iran; L 0–2	Bahrain; L 1–2	China; L 1–2	Sri Lanka; W 2–0	4	Did not advance		
Women's team	Hong Kong; L 0–2	Thailand; L 1–2	Vietnam; L 0–2	—N/a		4	Did not advance		

== Beach volleyball ==
The Philippines entered two pairs in the women's tournament.

Athletes	Event	Preliminary round				Round of 16	Quarterfinals	Semifinals	Finals	Rank
Athletes	Event	Opposition Score	Opposition Score	Opposition Score	Rank	Opposition Score	Opposition Score	Opposition Score	Opposition Score	Rank
Sunny Villapando; Grydelle Matibag	Women's tournament	Lam / Ian (MAC); W (21–19, 21–10)	Gantogtokh / Munkhbayar (MGL); W (21–10, 21–11)	Ryukhova / Karimova (KAZ); W (21–8, 21–8)	1Q	Wattelage / Alawaththage (SRI); W (21–15, 21–13)	R. Matsumoto / N. Matsumoto (JPN); L (10–21, 13–21)	Did not advance		
Khylem Progella; Sofia Pagara	Women's tournament	Leong / Law (MAC); W (21–19, 21–9)	Muzaffarova / Kurbanova (UZB); W (21–7, 21–3)	Kabulbekova / Ivanchenko (KAZ); W (21–17, 22–20)	1Q	Ryukhova / Karimova (KAZ); W (21–11, 21–14)	Kongphopsarutawadee / Naraphornrapat (THA); L (17–21, 15–21)	Did not advance		

== Beach wrestling ==
Athlete	Event	Group stage				Quarterfinal	Semifinal	Repechage	Final / BM	
Athlete	Event	Opposition Result	Opposition Result	Opposition Result	Rank	Opposition Result	Opposition Result	Opposition Result	Opposition Result	Rank
Joe Fer Callado	Men's 70 kg	Chhoeun (CAM); L 0–2	Daendongying (THA); L 1–4	Hossan (BAN); W 2–1	3	Did not advance				
Fierre Proudhon Afan	Men's 80 kg	Koshkinbayev (KAZ); L 0–2	Amjad (BAN); L 0–2	Sharifi (AFG); L 0–1	4	Did not advance				
Neonards Cervantes	Men's 90 kg	Aryan (IND); L 0–2	Inam (PAK); L 0–4	Mussin (KAZ); L 0–4	4	Did not advance				
Callum Johnston Roberts	Men's +90 kg	Kurbonaliev (TJK); L 0–2	Singh (IND); L 0–2	Lu Da (IND); L 0–2	4	Did not advance				
Aliah Rose Gavalez	Women's 50 kg	Ryskulova (KGZ); L 0–4	Cheon Mi-ran (KOR); L 0–2	Đoàn (VIE); L 0–1	4	Did not advance				
Miriam Grace Balisme	Women's 60 kg	Nguyễn (VIE); L 0–2	Chhoeun (CAM); W 2–0	Kwon (KOR); L 0–4	3	Did not advance				

== Dragon boat ==
Team roster

The Philippines sent a 12-man national dragon boat team for the men's events.

- Jims Vencent Arseño
- John Rey Barca
- Jhon Mark Bebero
- Jay Duterte
- Ivan Ercilla
- Jared Gedion Esquierdo
- Neljohn Fabro
- Ojay Fuentes
- John Loyd Lipata
- Roger Kenneth Masbate
- John James Pelagio
- Jobert Peñaranda
- Alfred Reformina
- Franz Ezer Seniman

Men's tournament

Event	Heats		Semifinals		Final	
Event	Time	Rank	Time	Rank	Time	Rank
Men's 100m	25.523	2 SF	26.334	3 MF	26.958	5
Men's 200m	50.228	3 SF	51.224	4 MF	52.118	6
Men's 400m	1:39.504	2 SF	1:41.146	3 MF	1:40.889	5

== Ju-jitsu ==
=== Men ===
Athlete	Event	Round of 32	Round of 16	Quarterfinals	Semifinals	Final	
Athlete	Event	Opposition Result	Opposition Result	Opposition Result	Opposition Result	Opposition Result	Rank
Santino Luis Luzuriaga	62kg	Bye	Kuntong (THA); L 0–2 PTS	Did not advance			9
Myron Myles Mangubat	62kg	Batsuuri (MGL); L 0–0 ADV	Did not advance				17
Yman Xavier Baluyo	69kg	Nazrizoda (TJK); L 0–50 SUB	Did not advance				17
Marc Alexander Lim	69kg	Choijamts (MGL); W 0–0 ADV	Joo S (KOR); L 0–50 SUB	Did not advance			9
Antonio Luigi Dy	77kg	Omar (SYR); W 13–9 PTS	Bolatbek (KAZ); L 0–50 SUB	Did not advance			9
Mark Constance Vergel	77kg	Almarzooqi (KUW); W 6–0 PTS	Madayev (KAZ); L 0–6 PTS	Did not advance			9

=== Women ===
Athlete	Event	Round of 32	Round of 16	Quarterfinals	Semifinals	Final / BM	
Athlete	Event	Opposition Result	Opposition Result	Opposition Result	Opposition Result	Opposition Result	Rank
Maria Ysabel Laureta	52kg	Bye	Alshamsi (UAE); L 0–50 SUB	Did not advance			9
Kaila Napolis	52kg	Bye	Suzuki (THA); W 4–2 PTS	Park J-h (KOR) W 6–2 PTS	Alhosani (UAE); L 0–2 PTS	Kulumbetova (KAZ); W 6–2 PTS	3rd place, bronze medalist(s)
Annie Ramirez	57kg	Bye	Zhang M (CHN); W 50–0 SUB	Tariq (PAK); W 50–0 SUB	Ehnkmunkh (MGL); W 5–2 PTS	Thomas (PHI); W 0–0 ADV	1st place, gold medalist(s)
Emily Thomas	57kg	Trinh (VIE); W 50–0 SUB	Jeong H (KOR); W 50–0 SUB	Sirimak (THA); W 50–0 SUB	Alameri (UAE); W 4–2 PTS	Ramirez (PHI); L 0–0 ADV	2nd place, silver medalist(s)
Alex Enriquez	63kg	Bye	Xu X. (CHN); W 50–0 SUB	Senatham (THA); W 50–0 SUB	Alkalbani (UAE); W 4–4 ADV	Lee Y-j (KOR); W 5–0 PTS	1st place, gold medalist(s)
Andrea Lois Lao	63kg	Ee (SGP); W 10–0 PTS	Assaf (SYR); W 50–0 SUB	Ishakat (JOR); W 50–0 SUB	Lee Y-j (KOR); L 2–5 PTS	Senatham (THA); L 0–3 PTS	5

== Sailing ==
Athlete	Event	Race															Net points	Final rank
Athlete	Event	1	2	3	4	5	6	7	8	9	10	11	12	13	14	15	Net points	Final rank
Dhenver Castillo	Foil Windsurfing Boys	3	2	(12); DNF	(7)	2	5	7	6	3	3	2	4	2	—N/a		39	2nd place, silver medalist(s)
Alfionnah Gonzalez	Foil Windsurfing Girls	(11); DNF	(11); DNF	4	11; BFD	6	9	5	8	5	9	6	3	—N/a			66	7
Kelsy Moreno	Foil Windsurfing Girls	4	4	(11); BFD	4	4	5	8	(9)	7	4	4	4	—N/a			48	5
Warner Janoya	Formula Kite Men	(10); DNS	4	5	4	5	7	5	6	7	6	6	8	8	5	(10); DNS	76	6
Rey Sastre	Formula Kite Men	3	5	7	6	7	5	(8)	5	(8)	8	5	7	6	8	5	77	7
Cyril Derla Dacudao	Formula Kite Women	(7); DNS	(7); DNS	7 DNF	4	5	6	7 RET	5	6	6	6	6	6	7 DNF	—N/a	71	5
Ian Carl Cariño	ILCA4 Boys	(25); DSQ	12	9	13	5	8	17	2	3	—N/a						69	9
Zildjan Samson	ILCA4 Boys	7	8	13	19	(25); UFD	19	10	21	7	—N/a						104	16
Rose Ann Marienau	ILCA4 Girls	15	12	(17)	13	10	14	14	16	14	—N/a						108	15
Carlstein Dulay	Optimist Boys	7	15	13	(23); BFD	6	14	14	12	6	13	—N/a					100	13
Kevin Millanas	Optimist Boys	(23); DSQ	14	15	23; BFD	23; BFD	8	5	23; DNE	8	7	—N/a					126	14
Amanda Amadeo	Optimist Girls	10	10	9	11; SP	6 SP	(15); DSQ	11	7	11	11	—N/a					86	11

== Sport climbing ==
The Philippines participation in sport climbing was highlighted by John Forones setting a new Philippine national record in the men's individual qualification by seting a time of 6.08 seconds.

Athlete	Event	Qualification		Round of 16	Quarterfinal	Semifinal	Final	Rank
Athlete	Event	Time	Rank	Round of 16	Quarterfinal	Semifinal	Final	Rank
Gerardo Acebedo IV	Men's individual	Fall	—N/a	Did not advance				
Juan Miguel Azupardo	Men's individual	7.20	35	Did not advance				
John Forones	Men's individual	6.08 NR	28	Did not advance				
Precious Cabuya	Women's individual	17.94	31	Did not advance				
Glory Ann Dizon	Women's individual	10.07	27	Did not advance				
Mecca Cortizano	Women's individual	18.27	32	Did not advance				
John Forones; Juan Miguel Azupardo	Men's relay	15.47	17	Did not advance				
Kevin Jeffrey Pascua; Gerardo Acebedo IV	Men's relay	21.68	18	Did not advance				
Precious Cabuya; Glory Ann Dizon	Women's relay	28.40	13	Did not advance				

== Teqball ==
Team	Event	Group stage					Quarterfinal	Semifinal	Final / BM
Team	Event	Opposition Score	Opposition Score	Opposition Score	Opposition Score	Rank	Opposition Score	Opposition Score	Rank
Prince Agustin; Anel Pacis	Men's Doubles	Hafez / Arabi (LBN); L 0–2	Inthalapheth / Phimmachak (LAO); L 0–2	—N/a		3	Did not advance		
Crystal Cariño; Joellene Cruz	Women's Doubles	Samah / Batool (IRQ); L 0–2	Shi / Cui (CHN); L 0–2	Win / Aung (MYA); L 0–2	Kim / Cha (PRK); L 0–2	5	—N/a	Did not advance	
Nicole Tabucol; Klyde Vincent Polca	Mixed Doubles	Gong / Mao (CHN); L 0–2	Dy / Bunl (CAM); L 0–2	—N/a		3	Did not advance		

== See also ==
- Philippines at the 2026 Asian Games
- Philippines at the 2026 Asian Para Games
