= Ju-jitsu at the 2026 Asian Beach Games =

Asian Beach Games event

- Venue: Yuhai Club
- Dates: 23–24 April 2026

Ju-jitsu competition at the 2026 Asian Beach Games was held at the Yuhai Road Beach, Sanya Bay in Sanya, China from 23 to 24 April 2026. The competition included only jiu-jitsu (formerly known as ne-waza) events. A total of 135 athletes from 22 nations competed.

== Medalists ==
=== Men ===
Event	Gold	Silver	Bronze
–62 kg	Khaled Al-Shehi; United Arab Emirates	Omar Al-Suwaidi; United Arab Emirates	Abdulmalik Al-Murdhi; Saudi Arabia
–62 kg	Khaled Al-Shehi; United Arab Emirates	Omar Al-Suwaidi; United Arab Emirates	Batyr Tenizbay; Kazakhstan
–69 kg	Nurzhan Batyrbekov; Kazakhstan	Lee Jae-young; South Korea	Joo Seong-hyeon; South Korea
–69 kg	Nurzhan Batyrbekov; Kazakhstan	Lee Jae-young; South Korea	Alinur Kuatuly; Kazakhstan
–77 kg	Park Jae-woon; South Korea	Mahdi Al-Awlaqi; United Arab Emirates	Seilkhan Bolatbek; Kazakhstan
–77 kg	Park Jae-woon; South Korea	Mahdi Al-Awlaqi; United Arab Emirates	Koo Bon-cheol; South Korea

=== Women ===
Event	Gold	Silver	Bronze
–52 kg	Asma Al-Hosani; United Arab Emirates	Im Eon-ju; South Korea	Kaila Napolis; Philippines
–52 kg	Asma Al-Hosani; United Arab Emirates	Im Eon-ju; South Korea	Ganbaataryn Mongoljin; Mongolia
–57 kg	Annie Ramirez; Philippines	Emily Thomas; Philippines	Shamsa Al-Ameri; United Arab Emirates
–57 kg	Annie Ramirez; Philippines	Emily Thomas; Philippines	Enkhmönkhiin Shürentsetseg; Mongolia
–63 kg	Alex Enriquez; Philippines	Lee Yeon-ji; South Korea	Shamma Al-Kalbani; United Arab Emirates
–63 kg	Alex Enriquez; Philippines	Lee Yeon-ji; South Korea	Orapa Senatham; Thailand

== Medal table ==
Rank	Nation	Gold	Silver	Bronze	Total
1	United Arab Emirates (UAE)	2	2	2	6
2	Philippines (PHI)	2	1	1	4
3	South Korea (KOR)	1	3	2	6
4	Kazakhstan (KAZ)	1	0	3	4
5	Mongolia (MGL)	0	0	2	2
6	Saudi Arabia (KSA)	0	0	1	1
6	Thailand (THA)	0	0	1	1
Totals (7 entries)		6	6	12	24

== Results ==
=== Men ===
==== 62 kg ====
23 April

Round of 32
Yang Byeong-jun (KOR)	50–0	Ibrahim Stas (SYR)
Mansur Khabibulla (KAZ)	50–0	Cấn Văn Thắng (VIE)
Suwijak Kuntong (THA)	2–0	Hasan Boymurodov (TJK)
Batsuuriin Bayartulga (MGL)	0–0	Myron Myles Mangubat (PHI)
Kaimoni Operana (CAM)	50–0	Ali Nazemi (IRI)
Choi Hyeon-myeong (KOR)	0–0	Naphat Mathupan (THA)
Alidzhon Bobomurodov (TJK)	50–0	Khamkeo Vilayphone (LAO)

Round of 16
Khaled Al-Shehi (UAE)	50
Yang Byeong-jun (KOR)	0
Lan Youzhe (CHN)	0
Mohammed Ajaj (PLE)	50
Taalaibek Baiyshev (KGZ)	0
Mansur Khabibulla (KAZ)	0
Suwijak Kuntong (THA)	2
Santino Luzuriaga (PHI)	0
Batyr Tenizbay (KAZ)	0
Batsuuriin Bayartulga (MGL)	0
Kaimoni Operana (CAM)	0
Omar Al-Suwaidi (UAE)	50
Noorullah Shafayee (AFG)	2
Choi Hyeon-myeong (KOR)	4
Alidzhon Bobomurodov (TJK)	0
Abdulmalik Al-Murdhi (KSA)	2

Quarterfinals
Khaled Al-Shehi (UAE)	2
Mohammed Ajaj (PLE)	0
Mansur Khabibulla (KAZ)	10
Suwijak Kuntong (THA)	2
Batyr Tenizbay (KAZ)	4
Omar Al-Suwaidi (UAE)	6
Choi Hyeon-myeong (KOR)	0
Abdulmalik Al-Murdhi (KSA)	50

Semifinals
Khaled Al-Shehi (UAE)	2
Mansur Khabibulla (KAZ)	0
Omar Al-Suwaidi (UAE)	50
Abdulmalik Al-Murdhi (KSA)	0

Gold medal contest
Khaled Al-Shehi (UAE)	4
Omar Al-Suwaidi (UAE)	2

Repechage
Mohammed Ajaj (PLE)	50
Suwijak Kuntong (THA)	0
Batyr Tenizbay (KAZ)	50
Choi Hyeon-myeong (KOR)	0

Bronze
Mohammed Ajaj (PLE)	0
Abdulmalik Al-Murdhi (KSA)	0
Batyr Tenizbay (KAZ)	2
Mansur Khabibulla (KAZ)	0

==== 69 kg ====
24 April

Round of 32
Batsükhiin Tserendavaa (MGL)	4–2	Kunnapong Hasdee (THA)
Hour Senghong (CAM)	0–50	Mohammed Bin Huraymil (KSA)
Sultan Jabr (UAE)	WO	Tu Buxin (CHN)
Nitsone Pheangsopha (LAO)	0–50	Ramazan Tianguber (KGZ)
Mahmudjon Nazrizoda (TJK)	50–0	Yman Xavier Baluyo (PHI)
Yousef Al-Dousari (KUW)	0–50	Noah Lim (SGP)
Sarin Soonthorn (THA)	0–50	Sao Sopheara (CAM)
Issa Chmaissani (KSA)	0–50	Alinur Kuatuly (KAZ)
Mohammad Omet (JOR)	0–0	Sultan Hassan (UAE)
Wang Yayong (CHN)	0–50	Mohammad Sarwar Hussaini (AFG)
Argen Abdymanapov (KGZ)	2–0	Đặng Đình Tùng (VIE)
Marc Lim (PHI)	0–0	Choijamtsyn Tüvdentarvaa (MGL)

Round of 16
Nurzhan Batyrbekov (KAZ)	3
Batsükhiin Tserendavaa (MGL)	0
Mohammed Bin Huraymil (KSA)	50
Ibrahim Al-Nsirat (SYR)	0
Sultan Jabr (UAE)	4
Ramazan Tianguber (KGZ)	2
Mahmudjon Nazrizoda (TJK)	0
Noah Lim (SGP)	50
Lee Jae-young (KOR)	50
Sao Sopheara (CAM)	0
Alinur Kuatuly (KAZ)	0
Sultan Hassan (UAE)	0
Mohammad Sarwar Hussaini (AFG)	0
Argen Abdymanapov (KGZ)	50
Marc Lim (PHI)	0
Joo Seong-hyeon (KOR)	50

Quarterfinals
Nurzhan Batyrbekov (KAZ)	0
Mohammed Bin Huraymil (KSA)	0
Sultan Jabr (UAE)	2
Noah Lim (SGP)	2
Lee Jae-young (KOR)	2
Alinur Kuatuly (KAZ)	0
Argen Abdymanapov (KGZ)	4
Joo Seong-hyeon (KOR)	5

Semifinals
Nurzhan Batyrbekov (KAZ)	4
Noah Lim (SGP)	0
Lee Jae-young (KOR)	50
Joo Seong-hyeon (KOR)	0

Gold medal contest
Nurzhan Batyrbekov (KAZ)	2
Lee Jae-young (KOR)	0

Repechage
Mohammed Bin Huraymil (KSA)	2
Sultan Jabr (UAE)	2
Alinur Kuatuly (KAZ)	0
Argen Abdymanapov (KGZ)	0

Bronze
Mohammed Bin Huraymil (KSA)	2
Joo Seong-hyeon (KOR)	4
Alinur Kuatuly (KAZ)	50
Noah Lim (SGP)	0

==== 77 kg ====
24 April

Round of 32
Kampanart Polput (THA)	0–0	Mahmoud Jabr (JOR)
Komil Boymurodov (TJK)	8–0	Wang Zhiyu (CHN)
Paul Lim (SGP)	2–0	Izzeddin Owdetallah (PLE)
Mönkhtöriin Davaadorj (MGL)	9–0	Shahzaib (PAK)
Moeun Lim Sopanha (CAM)	2–12	Koo Bon-cheol (KOR)
Mark Constance Vergel (PHI)	6–0	Fahad Al-Marzooqi (KUW)
Sultan Al-Hosani (UAE)	7–0	Chanwit Aunjai (THA)
Alaaldin Al-Khuzai (JOR)	4–0	Ramshed Abdulloev (TJK)
Usaamah Saleh (KSA)	2–0	Pejvak Zarinmah (IRI)
Bulgankhüügiin Shinezorig (MGL)	2–0	Nguyễn Tất Lộc (VIE)
Tamby Omar (SYR)	9–13	Luigi Dy (PHI)

Round of 16
Mahdi Al-Awlaqi (UAE)	6
Mahmoud Jabr (JOR)	2
Komil Boymurodov (TJK)	0
Paul Lim (SGP)	0
Mönkhtöriin Davaadorj (MGL)	0
Koo Bon-cheol (KOR)	4
Mark Constance Vergel (PHI)	0
Adlan Madayev (KAZ)	6
Park Jae-woon (KOR)	50
Sultan Al-Hosani (UAE)	0
Alaaldin Al-Khuzai (JOR)	4
Ahmed Al-Quradaghi (QAT)	0
Usaamah Saleh (KSA)	2
Bulgankhüügiin Shinezorig (MGL)	0
Luigi Dy (PHI)	0
Seilkhan Bolatbek (KAZ)	50

Quarterfinals
Mahdi Al-Awlaqi (UAE)	2
Paul Lim (SGP)	0
Koo Bon-cheol (KOR)	0
Adlan Madayev (KAZ)	0
Park Jae-woon (KOR)	2
Alaaldin Al-Khuzai (JOR)	2
Usaamah Saleh (KSA)	2
Seilkhan Bolatbek (KAZ)	9

Semifinals
Mahdi Al-Awlaqi (UAE)	4
Koo Bon-cheol (KOR)	0
Park Jae-woon (KOR)	4
Seilkhan Bolatbek (KAZ)	2

Gold medal contest
Mahdi Al-Awlaqi (UAE)	2
Park Jae-woon (KOR)	2

Repechage
Paul Lim (SGP)	2
Adlan Madayev (KAZ)	2
Alaaldin Al-Khuzai (JOR)	5
Usaamah Saleh (KSA)	0

Bronze
Paul Lim (SGP)	0
Seilkhan Bolatbek (KAZ)	2
Alaaldin Al-Khuzai (JOR)	0
Koo Bon-cheol (KOR)	0

=== Women ===
==== 52 kg ====
23 April

Round of 32
Sofia Anabel Rivas (SGP)	0–50	Mandakhnarangiin Khüslen (MGL)
Trần Thị Thanh Hà (VIE)	0–50	Lu Yue (CHN)
Miyu Suzuki (THA)	50–0	Chommany Manixay (LAO)

Round of 16
Im Eon-ju (KOR)	50
Mandakhnarangiin Khüslen (MGL)	0
Huang Yu (CHN)	0
Zhibek Kulumbetova (KAZ)	50
Tolgonai Nurlanova (KGZ)	0
Nutchaya Sugun (THA)	50
Ysabel Laureta (PHI)	0
Hessa Al-Shamsi (UAE)	50
Asma Al-Hosani (UAE)	50
Lu Yue (CHN)	0
Ganbaataryn Mongoljin (MGL)	50
Kayleigh Lim (SGP)	0
Fariza Qosimboeva (TJK)	0
Park Jeong-hye (KOR)	4
Miyu Suzuki (THA)	2
Kaila Napolis (PHI)	4

Quarterfinals
Im Eon-ju (KOR)	12
Zhibek Kulumbetova (KAZ)	0
Nutchaya Sugun (THA)	0
Hessa Al-Shamsi (UAE)	50
Asma Al-Hosani (UAE)	2
Ganbaataryn Mongoljin (MGL)	0
Park Jeong-hye (KOR)	2
Kaila Napolis (PHI)	6

Semifinals
Im Eon-ju (KOR)	50
Hessa Al-Shamsi (UAE)	0
Asma Al-Hosani (UAE)	2
Kaila Napolis (PHI)	0

Gold medal contest
Im Eon-ju (KOR)	0
Asma Al-Hosani (UAE)	0

Repechage
Zhibek Kulumbetova (KAZ)	50
Nutchaya Sugun (THA)	0
Ganbaataryn Mongoljin (MGL)	50
Park Jeong-hye (KOR)	0

Bronze
Zhibek Kulumbetova (KAZ)	0
Kaila Napolis (PHI)	0
Ganbaataryn Mongoljin (MGL)	2
Hessa Al-Shamsi (UAE)	0

==== 57 kg ====
24 April

Round of 32
Zhang Mengqi (CHN)	0–0	Zamzam Al-Hammadi (UAE)
Emily Thomas (PHI)	50–0	Trịnh Thị Thảo Trinh (VIE)

Round of 16
Annie Ramirez (PHI)	50
Zhang Mengqi (CHN)	0
Seena Nabas (JOR)	0
Ambreen Tariq (PAK)	9
Enkhmönkhiin Shürentsetseg (MGL)	8
Nuchanat Singchalad (THA)	2
Nguyễn Thị Minh Vương (VIE)	0
Lee Yu-jin (KOR)	2
Shamsa Al-Ameri (UAE)	50
Zhang Shiying (CHN)	0
Semaza Khut (JOR)	25
Toukky Sengdakee (LAO)	0
Baasanjargaliin Narankhishig (MGL)	0
Aksarapak Sirimak (THA)	2
Emily Thomas (PHI)	50
Jeong Hyeon-seon (KOR)	0

Quarterfinals
Annie Ramirez (PHI)	50
Ambreen Tariq (PAK)	0
Enkhmönkhiin Shürentsetseg (MGL)	50
Lee Yu-jin (KOR)	0
Shamsa Al-Ameri (UAE)	50
Semaza Khut (JOR)	0
Aksarapak Sirimak (THA)	0
Emily Thomas (PHI)	50

Semifinals
Annie Ramirez (PHI)	5
Enkhmönkhiin Shürentsetseg (MGL)	2
Shamsa Al-Ameri (UAE)	2
Emily Thomas (PHI)	4

Gold medal contest
Annie Ramirez (PHI)	0
Emily Thomas (PHI)	0

Repechage
Ambreen Tariq (PAK)	0
Lee Yu-jin (KOR)	50
Semaza Khut (JOR)	0
Aksarapak Sirimak (THA)	50

Bronze
Lee Yu-jin (KOR)	2
Shamsa Al-Ameri (UAE)	2
Aksarapak Sirimak (THA)	0
Enkhmönkhiin Shürentsetseg (MGL)	0

==== 63 kg ====
23 April

Round of 32
Jaslyn Ee (SGP)	0–10	Andrea Lao (PHI)
Park Hyeon-a (KOR)	0–4	Ngô Thị Thảo Vân (VIE)

Round of 16
Nadia Assaf (SYR)	0
Andrea Lao (PHI)	50
Maya Ishakat (JOR)	50
Gansükhiin Battsetseg (MGL)	0
Lee Yeon-ji (KOR)	3
Maria Elissavet Kokkoliou (THA)	0
Guan Chunming (CHN)	0
Azhar Salykova (KAZ)	0
Orapa Senatham (THA)	0
Tiffany Low (SGP)	0
Xu Xintong (CHN)	0
Alex Enriquez (PHI)	50
Zeena Al-Shaddad (JOR)	0
Enkhbaataryn Khaliun (MGL)	50
Ngô Thị Thảo Vân (VIE)	0
Shamma Al-Kalbani (UAE)	50

Quarterfinals
Andrea Lao (PHI)	50
Maya Ishakat (JOR)	0
Lee Yeon-ji (KOR)	50
Azhar Salykova (KAZ)	0
Orapa Senatham (THA)	0
Alex Enriquez (PHI)	50
Enkhbaataryn Khaliun (MGL)	0
Shamma Al-Kalbani (UAE)	50

Semifinals
Andrea Lao (PHI)	2
Lee Yeon-ji (KOR)	5
Alex Enriquez (PHI)	4
Shamma Al-Kalbani (UAE)	4

Gold medal contest
Lee Yeon-ji (KOR)	0
Alex Enriquez (PHI)	5

Repechage
Maya Ishakat (JOR)	0
Azhar Salykova (KAZ)	2
Orapa Senatham (THA)	0
Enkhbaataryn Khaliun (MGL)	0

Bronze
Azhar Salykova (KAZ)	0
Shamma Al-Kalbani (UAE)	4
Orapa Senatham (THA)	3
Andrea Lao (PHI)	0
