= Thailand at the 2026 Asian Beach Games =

- IOC code: THA
- NOC: National Olympic Committee of Thailand
- Website: olympicthai.org/en/ (in English)

in Sanya, China 22–30 April 2026
- Competitors: 175 in 14 sports
- Flag bearers: Joseph Jonathan Weston; Jutatip Kuntatong
- Medals Ranked 2nd: Gold 10 Silver 9 Bronze 9 Total 28

Asian Beach Games appearances
- 2008; 2010; 2012; 2014; 2016; 2026

Thailand competed in the 2026 Asian Beach Games in Sanya, Hainan, China from 22 to 30 April 2026. This marks the return of the Asian Beach Games, ten years since the 2016 edition in Da Nang, Vietnam. The delegation will have 175 athletes in 14 sports. Thailand has among the top five largest delegation to the games.

Kitesurfer Joseph Jonathan Weston and teqball player Jutatip Kuntatong were the flagbearers.

== Competitors ==
The following is the list of the number of competitors participating at the Games per sport/discipline.

Sport	Men	Women	Total
3x3 basketball	4	4	8
Aquathlon	3	3	6
Beach athletics	9	9	18
Beach handball	10	10	20
Beach kabaddi	6	6	12
Beach soccer	12	0	12
Beach volleyball	4	4	8
Beach water polo	7	7	14
Beach wrestling	1	1	2
Dragon boat	14	14	28
Ju-jitsu	6	6	12
Open water swimming	3	3	6
Sailing	8	8	16
Sport climbing	4	3	7
Teqball	3	3	6
Total	94	81	175

== Medal summary ==
2026 Asian Beach Games medal summary

=== Medal by sport ===
Sport	1st place, gold medalist(s)	2nd place, silver medalist(s)	3rd place, bronze medalist(s)	Total
3x3 basketball	0	1	1	2
Beach athletics	3	1	0	4
Beach handball	0	0	2	2
Beach volleyball	1	0	1	2
Beach water polo	0	0	1	1
Dragon boat	1	4	1	6
Ju-jitsu	0	0	1	1
Sailing	2	3	2	7
Teqball	3	0	0	3
Total	10	9	9	28

=== Medal by date ===
Medals by date
Date	1st place, gold medalist(s)	2nd place, silver medalist(s)	3rd place, bronze medalist(s)	Total
22 April	Opening ceremony			
23 April	0	0	1	1
24 April	0	1	2	3
25 April	3	1	0	4
26 April	1	3	0	4
27 April	3	0	0	3
28 April	2	3	2	7
29 April	1	1	3	5
30 April	0	0	1	1
30 April	Closing ceremony			
Total	10	9	9	28

=== Medalists ===
Medal	Name	Sport	Event	Date
Gold	Puripol Boonson	Beach athletics	Men's 60 m	25 April
Gold	Jirapat Khanonta	Beach athletics	Women's 60 m	25 April
Gold	Sukon Boon-em; Chaiyakarn Choochuen; Teerasak Chuden; Nattapon Kaewsri; Pronporm Klamsuk; Suwan Kwanthong; Danusorn Makkawal; Sukrit Rakkarn; Krittapat Samueangsri; Phatthara Sangdet; Nopphadol Sangthuang; Chetsadaporn Simma; Suriya Somrak; Pornchai Tesdee	Dragon boat	Men's 200 m	25 April
Gold	Jirapat Khanonta; Athicha Phetkun; Supanich Poolkerd; Manatsada Sanmano	Beach athletics	Women's 4 × 60 m Relay	26 April
Gold	Jirati Chanliang; Sorrasak Thaosiri	Teqball	Men's Doubles	27 April
Gold	Areeya Homdee; Jutatip Kuntatong	Teqball	Women's Doubles	27 April
Gold	Phakpong Dejaroen; Suphawadi Wongkhamchan	Teqball	Mixed Doubles	27 April
Gold	Rachata Sadtrakulwattana	Sailing	Boys' Optimist	28 April
Gold	Joseph Jonathan Weston	Sailing	Men's Formula Kite	28 April
Gold	Worapeerachayakorn Kongphopsarutawadee; Taravadee Naraphornrapat	Beach volleyball	Women's Team	29 April
Silver	Sukon Boon-em; Chaiyakarn Choochuen; Teerasak Chuden; Nattapon Kaewsri; Pronporm Klamsuk; Suwan Kwanthong; Danusorn Makkawal; Sukrit Rakkarn; Krittapat Samueangsri; Phatthara Sangdet; Nopphadol Sangthuang; Chetsadaporn Simma; Suriya Somrak; Pornchai Tesdee	Dragon boat	Men's 100 m	24 April
Silver	Peerada Armart; Jaruwan Chaikan; Atcharaporn Duanglawa; Karnpitcha Kanachart; Praewpan Kawsri; Thatsanee Khomkham; Pranchalee Moonkasem; Sayawadee Ngaosri; Nipaporn Nopsri; Khwanchanok Saeheng; Vipavas Sangthong; Onuma Teeranaew; Karaked Thaenkaew; Nootchanat Thoongpong	Dragon boat	Women's 200 m	25 April
Silver	Puripol Boonson; Soraoat Dapbang; Natawat Iamudom; Chutithat Pruksorranan	Beach athletics	Men's 4 × 60 m Relay	26 April
Silver	Sukon Boon-em; Chaiyakarn Choochuen; Teerasak Chuden; Nattapon Kaewsri; Pronporm Klamsuk; Suwan Kwanthong; Danusorn Makkawal; Sukrit Rakkarn; Krittapat Samueangsri; Phatthara Sangdet; Nopphadol Sangthuang; Chetsadaporn Simma; Suriya Somrak; Pornchai Tesdee	Dragon boat	Men's 400 m	26 April
Silver	Peerada Armart; Jaruwan Chaikan; Atcharaporn Duanglawa; Karnpitcha Kanachart; Praewpan Kawsri; Thatsanee Khomkham; Pranchalee Moonkasem; Sayawadee Ngaosri; Nipaporn Nopsri; Khwanchanok Saeheng; Vipavas Sangthong; Onuma Teeranaew; Karaked Thaenkaew; Nootchanat Thoongpong	Dragon boat	Women's 400 m	26 April
Silver	Hussaluk Srinakorn	Sailing	Boys' ILCA4	28 April
Silver	Sorawit Naksuk	Sailing	Boys' Optimist	28 April
Silver	Pailin Jaroenpon	Sailing	Girls' ILCA4	28 April
Silver	Nicola Franco; Chanatip Jakrawan; Freddie Lish; Panthawat Techasamran	3x3 basketball	Men's Team	29 April
Bronze	Orapa Senatham	Ju-jitsu	Women's Ne-waza –63 kg	23 April
Bronze	Paranee Chotrotchanaanan; Thanita Kongchouy; Pittayaporn Kwantongtanaree; Pimpin Ngamcharoensuktaworn; Kanruethai Riangsanthia; Sarocha Rueangsappaisan; Patrapee Sridee	Beach water polo	Women's Team	24 April
Bronze	Peerada Armart; Jaruwan Chaikan; Atcharaporn Duanglawa; Karnpitcha Kanachart; Praewpan Kawsri; Thatsanee Khomkham; Pranchalee Moonkasem; Sayawadee Ngaosri; Nipaporn Nopsri; Khwanchanok Saeheng; Vipavas Sangthong; Onuma Teeranaew; Karaked Thaenkaew; Nootchanat Thoongpong	Dragon boat	Women's 100 m	24 April
Bronze	Wachirawit Thonup	Sailing	Boys' Foil Windsurfing	28 April
Bronze	Pariyaporn Chantarawong	Sailing	Girls' Optimist	28 April
Bronze	Supavadee Kunchuan; Sroifa Phetnin; Kanokwan Prajuapsook; Sasiporn Wongtapha	3x3 basketball	Women's Team	29 April
Bronze	Fifa Kannarong; Open Kannarong; Manatsanan Panyajae; Sudthawee Prueprak; Theephop Puapan; Kittipong Ruksawong; Nutdanai Ruksawong; Anuthep Sanitpoj; Suchol Sawaengsin; Passakorn Srinamkham	Beach handball	Men's Team	29 April
Bronze	Wachirawit Muadpha; Netitorn Muneekul	Beach volleyball	Men's Team	29 April
Bronze	Ploysouy Dernribram; Namfon Jittoedsak; Nittaya Joisakoo; Rujira Khrueasri; Sasithorn Onnon; Niphaphon Pansopa; Saranya Saetang; Kittiyakorn Tapa; Thamonwan Thongthirat; Angkana Wongsason	Beach handball	Women's Team	30 April

== 3x3 basketball ==
Team	Event	Group Stage				Quarterfinals	Semifinals	Final / BM	
Team	Event	Opposition Score	Opposition Score	Opposition Score	Rank	Opposition Score	Opposition Score	Opposition Score	Rank
Thailand men's	Men's Team	Hong Kong; W 20–15	Singapore; W 21–11	Chinese Taipei; W 21–19	1 Q	Mongolia; W 21–11	Philippines; W 20–18	Qatar; L 10–21	2nd place, silver medalist(s)
Thailand women's	Women's Team	Singapore; W 20–13	Sri Lanka; W 21–6	—N/a	1 Q	Mongolia; W 21–9	China; L 16–18	Singapore; W 17–8	3rd place, bronze medalist(s)

== Aquathlon ==
Athlete	Event	Result	
Athlete	Event	Time	Rank
Kritsanaphon Phonphai	Men's Individual	32:07	12
Thaninthorn Pornnarintip	Men's Individual	32:58	17
Aisika Kaewyongkod	Women's Individual	36:18	17
Pichayanat Kittivorakij	Women's Individual	37:33	21
Pichayanat Kittivorakij; Nutprawee Phanomphaithoon; Thaninthorn Pornnarintip; Pitchanart Sripirom	4x Mixed Relay	1:10:15	9

== Beach athletics ==
Athlete	Event	Heat		Final	
Athlete	Event	Time	Rank	Time	Rank
Puripol Boonson	Men's 60m	6.78	2 Q	6.62	1st place, gold medalist(s)
Thawatchai Himaiad	Men's 60m	7.01	4	Did not advance	
Puripol Boonson; Soraoat Dapbang; Natawat Iamudom; Chutithat Pruksorranan	Men's 4 × 60 m Relay	—N/a		26.68	2nd place, silver medalist(s)
Jirapat Khanonta	Women's 60m	7.45	1 Q	7.46	1st place, gold medalist(s)
Supanich Poolkerd	Women's 60m	7.73	2 Q	7.67	6
Jirapat Khanonta; Athicha Phetkun; Supanich Poolkerd; Manatsada Sanmano	Women's 4 × 60 m Relay	—N/a		29.46	1st place, gold medalist(s)

Athlete	Event	Final	
Athlete	Event	Result	Rank
Nattapong Srinonta	Men's Long Jump	6.96	8
Eakkarin Boonlap	Men's Shot Put	17.46	6
Thatchakorn Noisri	Men's Shot Put	16.50	8
Supawat Choothong	Women's Long Jump	5.66	7
Parinya Chuaimaroeng	Women's Long Jump	5.72	6
Areerat Intadis	Women's Shot Put	16.10	4

== Beach handball ==
Team	Event	Group Stage								Semifinals	Final / BM	
Team	Event	Opposition Score	Opposition Score	Opposition Score	Opposition Score	Opposition Score	Opposition Score	Opposition Score	Rank	Opposition Score	Opposition Score	Rank
Thailand men's	Men's Team	Jordan; W 2–0	Mongolia; W 2–0	Oman; W 2–0	Pakistan; W 2–1	Maldives; W 2–0	Qatar; L 0–2	Bangladesh; W 2–0	2 Q	Iran; L 1–2	Bahrain; W 2–0	3rd place, bronze medalist(s)
Thailand women's	Women's Team	Vietnam; L 0–2	Philippines; W 2–1	Hong Kong; W 2–1	—N/a				2 Q	China; L 1–2	Turkmenistan; W 2–0	3rd place, bronze medalist(s)

== Beach kabaddi ==
Team	Event	Group Stage				Semifinals	Final	
Team	Event	Opposition Score	Opposition Score	Opposition Score	Rank	Opposition Score	Opposition Score	Rank
Thailand men's	Men's Team	Sri Lanka; L 29–43	India; L 32–52	Chinese Taipei; W 56–27	3	Did not advance		
Thailand women's	Women's Team	Bangladesh; L 34–51	Chinese Taipei; W 48–28	Nepal; L 33–49	3	Did not advance		

== Beach soccer ==
Team	Event	Group Stage				Semifinals	Final	
Team	Event	Opposition Score	Opposition Score	Opposition Score	Rank	Opposition Score	Opposition Score	Rank
Thailand men's	Men's Team	Saudi Arabia; L 4–8	Iran; L 1–13	United Arab Emirates; L 3–4	4	Did not advance		

== Beach volleyball ==
Athlete	Event	Preliminary round					Round of 16	Quarterfinals	Semifinals	Final / BM	
Athlete	Event	Opposition Score	Opposition Score	Opposition Score	Opposition Score	Rank	Opposition Score	Opposition Score	Opposition Score	Opposition Score	Rank
Banlue Nakprakhong; Poravid Taovalo	Men's	Haziq / Tan (MAS); W 2–0 (21–6, 21–10)	Bae / Yeo (KOR); W 2–0 (21–5, 21–12)	Bat-Enkh / Nymdagva (MGL); W 2–0 DSQ (21–0, 21–0)	Mokhammad / Yakovlev (KAZ); W 2–0 (21–16, 21–12)	1 Q	Zhang / Zhou (CHN); L 1–2 (21–18, 17–21, 12–15)	Did not advance			
Wachirawit Muadpha; Netitorn Muneekul	Men's	Bae / Oh (KOR); W 2–0 (21–9, 21–14)	Bayhaqly / Faisal (INA); W 2–0 (21–13, 26–24)	El Chabib / Karam (LBN); W 2–1 (21–17, 15–21, 15–7)	—N/a	1 Q	Alkhawaher / Mahfouz (KSA); W 2–0 (21–16, 21–16)	Akbar / Efendi (INA); W 2–1 (21–13, 21–23, 16–14)	Janko / Samba (QAT); L 0–2 (12–21, 14–21)	Al Hashimi / Al Jalaboubi (OMA); W 2–0 (21–18, 21–15)	3rd place, bronze medalist(s)
Salinda Mungkhon; Patcharaporn Seehawong	Women's	Akter / Khatun (BAN); W 2–0 (21–9, 21–5)	Ishaq / Mariyam (MDV); W 2–0 (21–5, 21–6)	Anasthasya / Sari (INA); W 2–0 (21–18, 21–12)	—N/a	1 Q	Kudaikulova / Mamatzhan (KGZ); W 2–0 (21–11, 21–9)	Kadeliye / Zhou (CHN); W 2–1 (15–21, 21–17, 15–11)	N. Matsumoto / R. Matsumoto (JPN); L 0–2 (14–21, 13–21)	Dong / Jiang (CHN); L 1–2 (14–21, 21–18, 13–15)	4
Worapeerachayakorn Kongphopsarutawadee; Taravadee Naraphornrapat	Women's	Kung / Yeh (TPE); W 2–0 (21–13, 21–14)	Al Nahi / Cheiykho (LBN); W 2–0 (21–10, 21–10)	—N/a		1 Q	Kim / Seo (KOR); W 2–0 (21–7, 21–6)	Pagara / Procella (PHI); W 2–0 (21–17, 21–15)	Dong / Jiang (CHN); W 2–1 (19–21, 21–16, 15–11)	N. Matsumoto / R. Matsumoto (JPN); W 2–0 (21–17, 21–15)	1st place, gold medalist(s)

== Beach water polo ==
Team	Event	Group Stage					
Team	Event	Opposition Score	Opposition Score	Opposition Score	Opposition Score	Opposition Score	Rank
Thailand men's	Men's Team	Kazakhstan; L 1–3	China; L 0–3	South Korea; L 1–3	Iran; L 0–3	Hong Kong; L 0–3	6
Thailand women's	Women's Team	Kazakhstan; L 2–3 PSO	China; L 0–3	Hong Kong; W 3–2 PSO	—N/a		3rd place, bronze medalist(s)

== Beach wrestling ==
Athlete	Event	Group Stage				Quarterfinals	Semifinals	Repechage	Final	
Athlete	Event	Opposition Score	Opposition Score	Opposition Score	Rank	Opposition Score	Opposition Score	Opposition Score	Opposition Score	Rank
Phanomphon Daendongying	Men's 70kg	Hossan (BAN); W 1–0	Callado (PHI); W 4–1	Chhoeun (CAM); W 2–1	1 Q	Abdullah (PAK); L 0–4	Did not advance			
Banjong Poonmat	Women's +70 kg	Yertostik (KAZ); L 1–4	Priya (IND); L 1–4	Zhanybekova (KGZ); L 0–2	4	—N/a	Did not advance			

== Dragon Boat ==
Athlete	Event	Heat		Semifinals		Final	
Athlete	Event	Time	Rank	Time	Rank	Time	Rank
Sukon Boon-em; Chaiyakarn Choochuen; Teerasak Chuden; Nattapon Kaewsri; Pronporm Klamsuk; Suwan Kwanthong; Danusorn Makkawal; Sukrit Rakkarn; Krittapat Samueangsri; Phatthara Sangdet; Nopphadol Sangthuang; Chetsadaporn Simma; Suriya Somrak; Pornchai Tesdee	Men's 100 m	24.806	1 Q	—N/a		24.210	2nd place, silver medalist(s)
Sukon Boon-em; Chaiyakarn Choochuen; Teerasak Chuden; Nattapon Kaewsri; Pronporm Klamsuk; Suwan Kwanthong; Danusorn Makkawal; Sukrit Rakkarn; Krittapat Samueangsri; Phatthara Sangdet; Nopphadol Sangthuang; Chetsadaporn Simma; Suriya Somrak; Pornchai Tesdee	Men's 200 m	47.434	2 q	49.174	2 Q	45.500	1st place, gold medalist(s)
Sukon Boon-em; Chaiyakarn Choochuen; Teerasak Chuden; Nattapon Kaewsri; Pronporm Klamsuk; Suwan Kwanthong; Danusorn Makkawal; Sukrit Rakkarn; Krittapat Samueangsri; Phatthara Sangdet; Nopphadol Sangthuang; Chetsadaporn Simma; Suriya Somrak; Pornchai Tesdee	Men's 400 m	1:39.293	1 Q	—N/a		1:35.614	2nd place, silver medalist(s)

Athlete	Event	Heat		Semifinals		Final	
Athlete	Event	Time	Rank	Time	Rank	Time	Rank
Peerada Armart; Jaruwan Chaikan; Atcharaporn Duanglawa; Karnpitcha Kanachart; Praewpan Kawsri; Thatsanee Khomkham; Pranchalee Moonkasem; Sayawadee Ngaosri; Nipaporn Nopsri; Khwanchanok Saeheng; Vipavas Sangthong; Onuma Teeranaew; Karaked Thaenkaew; Nootchanat Thoongpong	Women's 100 m	28.102	1 Q	—N/a		29.631	3rd place, bronze medalist(s)
Peerada Armart; Jaruwan Chaikan; Atcharaporn Duanglawa; Karnpitcha Kanachart; Praewpan Kawsri; Thatsanee Khomkham; Pranchalee Moonkasem; Sayawadee Ngaosri; Nipaporn Nopsri; Khwanchanok Saeheng; Vipavas Sangthong; Onuma Teeranaew; Karaked Thaenkaew; Nootchanat Thoongpong	Women's 200 m	56.012	2 q	55.925	1 Q	54.748	2nd place, silver medalist(s)
Peerada Armart; Jaruwan Chaikan; Atcharaporn Duanglawa; Karnpitcha Kanachart; Praewpan Kawsri; Thatsanee Khomkham; Pranchalee Moonkasem; Sayawadee Ngaosri; Nipaporn Nopsri; Khwanchanok Saeheng; Vipavas Sangthong; Onuma Teeranaew; Karaked Thaenkaew; Nootchanat Thoongpong	Women's 400 m	1:56.919	3 q	1:56.768	2 Q	1:51.704	2nd place, silver medalist(s)

== Ju-jitsu ==
Athlete	Event	Round of 32	Round of 16	Quarterfinals	Semifinals	Repechage	Final / BM	
Athlete	Event	Opposition Result	Opposition Result	Opposition Result	Opposition Result	Opposition Result	Opposition Result	Rank
Suwijak Kuntong	Men's Newaza −62 kg	Boimurodov (TJK); W 2–0 PTS	Luzuriaga (PHI); W 2–0 PTS	Khabibulla (KAZ); L 2–10 PTS	Did not advance	Ajaj (PLE); L 0–50 SUB	Did not advance	
Naphat Mathupan	Men's Newaza −62 kg	Choi (KOR); L 0–0 ADV	Did not advance					
Kunnapong Hasdee	Men's Newaza −69 kg	Tserendavaa (MGL); L 2–4 PTS	Did not advance					
Sarin Soonthorn	Men's Newaza −69 kg	Sopheara (CAM); L 0–50 SUB	Did not advance					
Chanwit Aunjai	Men's Newaza −77 kg	Alhosani (UAE); L 0–7 PTS	Did not advance					
Kampanart Polput	Men's Newaza −77 kg	Jabr (JOR); L 0–0 ADV	Did not advance					
Nutchaya Sugun	Women's Newaza −52 kg	Bye	Nurlanova (KGZ); W 50–0 SUB	Alshamsi (UAE); L 0–50 SUB	Did not advance	Kulumbetova (KAZ); L 0–50 SUB	Did not advance	
Miyu Suzuki	Women's Newaza −52 kg	Manixay (LAO); W 50–0 SUB	Napolis (PHI); L 2–4 PTS	Did not advance				
Nuchanat Singchalad	Women's Newaza −57 kg	Bye	Shurentsetseg (MGL); L 2–8 PTS	Did not advance				
Aksarapak Sirimak	Women's Newaza −57 kg	Bye	Narankhishig (MGL); W 2–0 PTS	Thomas (PHI); L 0–50 SUB	Did not advance	Khut (JOR); W 50–0 SUB	Shurentsetseg (MGL); L 0–0 ADV	4
Maria Elissavet Kokkoliou	Women's Newaza −63 kg	Bye	Lee (KOR); L 0–3 PTS	Did not advance				
Orapa Senatham	Women's Newaza −63 kg	Bye	Low (SGP); W 0–0 ADV	Enriquez (PHI); L 0–50 SUB	Did not advance	Enkhbaatar (MGL); W 0–0 ADV	Lao (PHI); W 3–0 PTS	3rd place, bronze medalist(s)

== Open water swimming ==
Athlete	Event	Result	
Athlete	Event	Time	Rank
Kittinun Chothistayanggoon	Men's 5km	59:51.5	15
Khomchan Wichachai	Men's 5km	57:16.1	9
Elisabeth Yim Calmels	Women's 5km	1:05:28.1	8
Thitirat Charoensup	Women's 5km	DNF	
Elisabeth Yim Calmels; Chonpasanop Chatwuti; Nitis Natesawang; Khomchan Wichachai	Mixed 4x1.5km Relay	1:09:57.6	6

== Sailing ==
Athlete	Event	Race															Total	
Athlete	Event	1	2	3	4	5	6	7	8	9	10	11	12	13	14	15	Points	Rank
Ratcharnon Khunjeng	Boys' Foil Windsurfing	(12); DNF	4	(12); DNF	5 SP	12; BFD	4 SP	4	7	6	5	7	12; DNF	12; DNF	—N/a		102	8
Wachirawit Thonup	Boys' Foil Windsurfing	4	(12); DNF	3	5	3	(6)	3	4	5	4	3	2	3	—N/a		57	3rd place, bronze medalist(s)
Pacharapol Rumvisai	Boys' ILCA4	4	4	6	4	(25); UFD	14	11	8	9	—N/a						85	7
Hussaluk Srinakorn	Boys' ILCA4	2	(14)	2	5	6	1	6	9	8	—N/a						53	2nd place, silver medalist(s)
Sorawit Naksuk	Boys' Optimist	9	1	4	6	3	10	2	3	2	(23); RET	—N/a					63	2nd place, silver medalist(s)
Rachata Sadtrakulwattana	Boys' Optimist	4	2	5	1	1	5	8	6	(10)	2	—N/a					44	1st place, gold medalist(s)
Sagdipat Thongjan	Men's Formula Kite	(10); DNS	(10); DNF	6	7	4	3	4	10; DNF	5	4	3	1	4	4	10; DNS	85	5
Joseph Jonathan Weston	Men's Formula Kite	1	1	2	1	1	2	(3)	1	2	3	2	(4)	2	3	1	29	1st place, gold medalist(s)
Chanatkan Charoensuk	Girls' Foil Windsurfing	(11); DNF	(11); DNF	6	11; DNF	8	6	6	6	6	6	11; DNF	11; DNF	—N/a			99	8
Wannida Winthachai	Girls' Foil Windsurfing	(11); DNF	(11); DNF	11; BDF	11; DNF	11; RET	7	10	7	8	8	7	11; DNF	—N/a			113	10
Pailin Jaroenpon	Girls' ILCA4	3	1	7	5	4	3	(8)	1	3	—N/a						35	2nd place, silver medalist(s)
Thanaporn Phokaew	Girls' ILCA4	2	9	8	3	5	7	(12)	10	21; DNE	—N/a						77	9
Pariyaporn Chantarawong	Girls' Optimist	5	2	5	2	2	2	(9)	8	6	3	—N/a					44	3rd place, bronze medalist(s)
Surapha Muangngam	Girls' Optimist	2	(8)	8	4	6	4	4	4	3	5	—N/a					48	5
Benyapa Jantawan	Women's Formula Kite	(7); DNS	(7); DNS	4	(7); DNS	4	3	(7); DNF	4	3	3	3	3	3	7 DNF	—N/a	65	4
Sipang Juntrangkul	Women's Formula Kite	(7); DNS	(7); DNS	7 DNF	7 DNS	7 DNS	5	7 DNF	6	5	5	5	5	5	7 DNF	—N/a	85	6

Keys:

- BFD: Disqualification under rule 30.4.
- DNE: Disqualification that is not excludable.
- DNF: Did not finish.
- DNS: Did not start.
- RET: Retired.
- SP: Standard penalty.
- UFD: Disqualification under rule 30.3.

== Sport climbing ==
Athlete	Event	Qualification				Round of 16	Quarterfinals	Semifinals	Final / BM	
Athlete	Event	Lane A	Lane B	Time	Rank	Opposition Time	Opposition Time	Opposition Time	Opposition Time	Rank
Phanuphong Bunprakop	Men's Individual	FALL			39	Did not advance				
Sirapob Jirajaturapak	Men's Individual	5.65	FALL	5.65	22	Did not advance				
Aphiwit Limpanichpakdee	Men's Individual	FS	5.014	5.014	9 Q	Wu (CHN); W 5.16–FALL	Zhao (CHN); L 4.87–4.66	Did not advance		
Nawaphon Suwannarat	Men's Individual	6.00	6.31	6.00	27	Did not advance				
Nalat Disyabut	Women's Individual	9.44	9.39	9.39	25	Did not advance				
Napat Disyabut	Women's Individual	8.63	9.08	8.63	22	Did not advance				
Narada Disyabut	Women's Individual	FALL	8.82	8.82	23	Did not advance				

Athlete	Event	Qualification				Round of 16	Quarterfinals	Semifinals	Final / BM	
Athlete	Event	Lane A&B	Lane C&D	Time	Rank	Opposition Time	Opposition Time	Opposition Time	Opposition Time	Rank
Phanuphong Bunprakop; Aphiwit Limpanichpakdee	Men's Relay	11.79	13.21	11.79	10 Q	Fujino / Tabuchi (JPN); W 11.03–FS	Maimuratov / Toktarov (KAZ); W 12.06–12.21	Long / Zhao (CHN); L FS– —	Ra. Khaibullin / Ri. Khaibullin (KAZ); L FALL–11.98	4
Sirapob Jirajaturapak; Nawaphon Suwannarat	Men's Relay	13.57	18.77	13.57	14 Q	Long / Zhao (CHN); L FALL–12.00	Did not advance			
Napat Disyabut; Narada Disyabut	Women's Relay	19.84	17.75	17.75	10	Did not advance				

== Teqball ==
Athlete	Event	Preliminary round					Quarterfinals	Semifinals	Final	
Athlete	Event	Opposition Score	Opposition Score	Opposition Score	Opposition Score	Rank	Opposition Score	Opposition Score	Opposition Score	Rank
Jirati Chanliang; Sorrasak Thaosiri	Men's Doubles	Friday / Tun (MYA); W 2–0 (12–6, 12–5)	Ratana / Soun (CAM); W 2–0 (12–2, 12–7)	—N/a		1 Q	Kim / Ri (PRK); W 2–0 (12–4, 12–10)	Arabi / Hafez (LBN); W 2–0 (12–8, 12–10)	Ali / Radhi (IRQ); W 2–1 (12–7, 9–12, 12–3)	1st place, gold medalist(s)
Areeya Homdee; Jutatip Kuntatong	Women's Doubles	Chaleunsouk / Phommyvong (LAO); W 2–0 (12–1, 12–4)	Sreymeas / Sophornraksmey (CAM); W 2–0 (12–2, 12–2)	Al-Failakawi / Al-Mansour (KUW); W 2–0 (12–4, 12–2)	Nguyễn / Trịnh (VIE); W 2–0 (12–2, 12–1)	1 Q	—N/a	Aung / Win (MYA); W 2–0 (12–5, 12–5)	Cha / Kim (PRK); W 2–0 (12–8, 12–3)	1st place, gold medalist(s)
Phakpong Dejaroen; Suphawadi Wongkhamchan	Mixed Doubles	Kim / Han (PRK); W 2–0 (12–6, 12–4)	Al-Ibrahim / Al-Failakawi (KUW); W 2–0 (12–2, 12–3)	—N/a		1 Q	Ali / Samah (IRQ); W 2–0 (12–6, 12–10)	Lwin / Wai (MYA); W 2–0 (12–7, 12–11)	Kim / Han (PRK); W 2–0 (12–6, 12–10)	1st place, gold medalist(s)
