= United Arab Emirates at the 2026 Asian Beach Games =

- IOC code: UAE
- NOC: United Arab Emirates National Olympic Committee
- Website: www.uaenoc.ae

in Sanya, China 22–30 April 2026
- Competitors: 31 in 4 sports
- Medals Ranked 7th: Gold 2 Silver 2 Bronze 2 Total 6

Asian Beach Games appearances
- 2008; 2010; 2012; 2014; 2016; 2026

The United Arab Emirates competed at the 2026 Asian Beach Games in Sanya, China from 22 to 30 April 2026. This marks the return of the Asian Beach Games, ten years since the 2016 edition in Da Nang, Vietnam.

== Medalists ==
=== Gold ===
No.	Medal	Name	Sport	Event	Date
1	Gold	Khaled Alshehh	Ju-jitsu	Men's Ne-waza −62kg	23 Apr
2	Gold	Asma Alhosani	Ju-jitsu	Women's Ne-waza −52kg	23 Apr

=== Silver ===
No.	Medal	Name	Sport	Event	Date
1	(silver) Silver	Omar Alsuwaidi	Ju-jitsu	Men's Ne-waza −62g	23 Apr
2	(silver) Silver	Mahdi Alawlaqi	Ju-jitsu	Women's Ne-waza −77kg	24 Apr

=== Bronze ===
No.	Medal	Name	Sport	Event	Date
1	Bronze	Shamma Alkalbani	Ju-jitsu	Women's Ne-waza −63kg	23 Apr
2	Bronze	Shamsa Alameri	Ju-jitsu	Women's Ne-waza −52kg	24 Apr

== Competitors ==
The following is the list of the number of competitors participating at the Games per sport/discipline.

Sport	Men	Women	Total
Beach soccer	12	0	12
Ju-jitsu	6	6	12
Open water swimming	2	0	2
Sailing	3	2	5
Total	23	8	31

== Beach soccer ==
Event	Group Stage				Semifinals	Final / BM	
Event	Opposition Score	Opposition Score	Opposition Score	Rank	Opposition Score	Opposition Score	Rank
Men's team	Iran; L 2–5	Saudi Arabia; L 4–8	Thailand; W 4–3	3	Did not advance		

== Ju-jitsu ==
=== Men ===
Athlete	Event	Round of 32	Round of 16	Quarterfinals	Semifinals / Repechage	Final	
Athlete	Event	Opposition Result	Opposition Result	Opposition Result	Opposition Result	Opposition Result	Rank
Khaled Alshehhi	62kg	Bye	Yang (KOR); W 50–0 SUB	Ajaj (PLE); W 2–0 PTS	Khabibulla (KAZ); W 2–0 PTS	Alsuwaidi (UAE); W 4–2 PTS	1st place, gold medalist(s)
Omar Alsuwaidi	62kg	Bye	Richhavath (CAM); W 50–0 SUB	Tenizbay (KAZ); W 6–4 PTS	Al-Murdhi (KSA); W 50–0 SUB	Alshehhi (UAE); L 2–4 PTS	2nd place, silver medalist(s)
Sultan Hassan	69kg	Omet (JOR); W 0–0 ADV	Kuatuly (KAZ); L 0–0 ADV	Did not advance			
Sultan Jabr	69kg	Tu (CHN); W 0–0 DNS	Tianguber (KGZ); W 4–2 PTS	N. Lim (SGP); L 2–2 ADV	Huraymil (KSA); L 2–2 ADV	Did not advance	
Mahdi Alawlaqi	77kg	Bye	Jabr (JOR); W 6–2 PTS	P. Lim (SGP); W 2–0 PTS	Koo (KOR); W 4–0 PTS	Park (KOR); L 2–2 ADV	2nd place, silver medalist(s)
Sultan Alhosani	77kg	Aunjai (THA); W 7–0 PTS	Park (KOR); L 0–50 SUB	Did not advance			

=== Women ===
Athlete	Event	Round of 32	Round of 16	Quarterfinals	Semifinals	Final / BM	
Athlete	Event	Opposition Result	Opposition Result	Opposition Result	Opposition Result	Opposition Result	Rank
Asma Alhosani	52kg	Bye	Lu (CHN); W 50–0 SUB	Mongoljin (MGL); W 2–0 PTS	Napolis (PHI); W 2–0 PTS	Im (KOR); W 0–0 ADV	1st place, gold medalist(s)
Hessa Alshamsi	52kg	Bye	Laureta (PHI); W 50–0 SUB	Sugun (THA); W 50–0 SUB	Im (KOR); L 50–0 SUB	Mongoljin (MGL); L 0–2 PTS	4
Shamsa Alameri	57kg	Bye	Zhang S. (CHN); W 50–0 SUB	Khut (JOR); W 50–0 SUB	Thomas (PHI); L 2–4 PTS	Lee (KOR); W 2–2 ADV	3rd place, bronze medalist(s)
Zamzam Alhammadi	57kg	Zhang M. (CHN); L 0–0 ADV	Did not advance				
Shamma Alkalbani	63kg	Bye	Ngô (VIE); W 50–0 SUB	Khaliun (MGL); W 50–0 SUB	Enriquez (PHI); L 4–4 ADV	Salykova (KAZ); W 0–4 PTS	3rd place, bronze medalist(s)
Muhra Mahfoudh	63kg	Withdrew					

== Open water swimming ==
Men

Athlete	Time	Rank
Мohamed Alyammahi	OTL	—N/a
Ahmed Alblooshi	OTL	—N/a
