= 2028 Asian Beach Games =

Multi-sport event in Cebu City, Philippines

VII Asian Beach Games
- Host city: Cebu City, Philippines
- Nations: 45 (projected)
- Events: TBA in 24 sports
- Opening: March 2028
- Closing: TBA
- Ceremony venue: TBA

The 2028 Asian Beach Games, officially the Seventh Asian Beach Games, and commonly known as Cebu 2028, is a continental multi-sport event for beach sports which is scheduled to be held in Cebu City, Philippines sometime around March 2028.

== Development ==
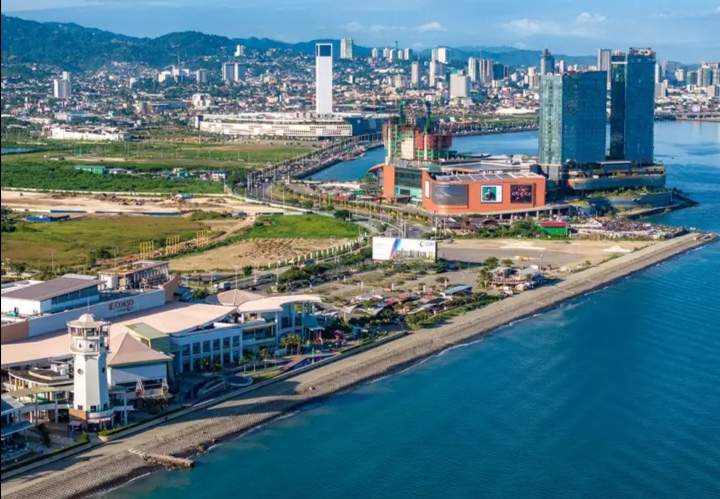
The South Road Properties in Cebu City.

=== Host selection ===
The Philippine Olympic Committee (POC) first publicized its intention to host the Asian Beach Games in January 2, 2026. The plans to host the beach sports tournament and the 2027 SEA Plus Youth Games is part of the Philippine Sports Commission's sports tourism campaign of the state agency's chairman Patrick Gregorio. In March 2026, Cebu City was announced to be the chosen host city for the Games.

The hosting rights of Cebu City for the 2028 Asian Beach Games was formalized on April 27, 2026 with the signing of the host city contract at the Conifer Resort during the 2026 Asian Beach Games in Sanya, China. The event was led by officials of the POC and the Olympic Council of Asia (OCA).

The last time the Philippines hosted an OCA-sanctioned event was the 1954 Asian Games. The island resort of Boracay in Kalibo, Aklan was supposed to host the 2014 Asian Beach Games. The island was awarded the hosting rights in 2006. In November 2010, the 2014 Games was moved to Phuket, Thailand.

=== Venues ===
Most venues for the 2028 Asian Beach Games are planned to be clustered at the South Road Properties. Facilities within the SM Seaside City complex will also be used for the Games, including the SMX Convention Center and the SM Seaside Cebu Arena, which is eyed for the opening and closing ceremonies.

== The Games ==
As of April 2026, the organizing committee for the 2028 Asian Games is preparing a preliminary sports program featuring 24 sports, subject to final approval from the Olympic Council of Asia.

== Marketing ==
The logo and mascot for the 2028 Asian Beach Games is projected to be unveiled sometime around June 2026.

| Preceded by Sanya | Asian Beach Games; Cebu | Succeeded by |
