= Aquathlon at the 2026 Asian Beach Games =

Sport competition

- Venue: Sanya Bay
- Dates: 23–25 April 2026

Aquathlon competition at the 2026 Asian Beach Games took place at the Sanya Bay (Photography Base) in Sanya, China from 23 to 25 April 2026. It was the debut appearance for the sport at the Asian Beach Games.

The Aquathlon comprises three components: running 2.5 km (1.6 mi), swimming 1 km (0.62 mi), and running 2.5 km (1.6 mi). The competitions take the form of a single event between all competitors with no heats. The mixed team event features teams of four (two men and two women). Each athlete runs 1,250 m (1,370 yd), swims 500 m (0.31 mi), and runs 1,250 m (0.78 mi) in a relay format.

== Medalists ==
Event	Gold	Silver	Bronze
Men's individual	Fan Junjie; China	Teng Yunfeng; China	Pan Tzu-i; Chinese Taipei
Women's individual	Lin Xinyu; China	Margot Garabedian; Cambodia	Lu Meiyi; China
Mixed relay	China; Lin Xinyu; Teng Yunfeng; Lu Meiyi; Luo Yunkang	Hong Kong; Bailee Brown; Wong Tsz To; Hilda Choi; Mark Yu	Japan; Mao Shimazaki; Isaki Oku; Ikumi Seto; Yuya Kobayashi

== Medal table ==
Rank	Nation	Gold	Silver	Bronze	Total
1	China (CHN)	3	1	1	5
2	Cambodia (CAM)	0	1	0	1
2	Hong Kong (HKG)	0	1	0	1
4	Chinese Taipei (TPE)	0	0	1	1
4	Japan (JPN)	0	0	1	1
Totals (5 entries)		3	3	3	9

== Results ==
=== Men's individual ===
23 April

Rank	Athlete	Time
1st place, gold medalist(s)	Fan Junjie (CHN)	28:20
2nd place, silver medalist(s)	Teng Yunfeng (CHN)	28:30
3rd place, bronze medalist(s)	Pan Tzu-i (TPE)	28:33
4	Isaki Oku (JPN)	28:57
5	Daryn Konysbayev (KAZ)	29:10
6	Mark Yu (HKG)	29:38
7	Andrew Kim Remolino (PHI)	30:01
8	Yip Tak Long (HKG)	30:14
9	Isaac Tan (MAS)	31:41
10	Yap Qi Yi (MAS)	31:42
11	Abdelrahman Tantish (PLE)	31:47
12	Kritsanaphon Phonphai (THA)	32:07
13	Ehab Khallouf (SYR)	32:20
14	Lim Cheng Yu (SGP)	32:22
15	Chiang Tien-yu (TPE)	32:24
16	Cesar Al-Shoumari (SYR)	32:52
17	Thaninthorn Pornnarintip (THA)	32:58
18	Matthew Hermosa (PHI)	33:18
19	Mohammed Al-Gheilani (OMA)	33:43
20	Adamkhan Salamatov (KGZ)	34:19
21	Lao Cheok Hei (MAC)	34:20
22	Jawad Youness (LBN)	34:52
23	Temirlan Abdrakhimov (KGZ)	35:06
24	Shaheen Al-Kaabi (QAT)	35:44
25	Chan Chon Ip (MAC)	35:53
26	Abdulaziz Al-Howaidi (KUW)	36:31
27	Mohammed Bukhalaf (KUW)	37:14
28	Hamza Asif (PAK)	37:26
29	Erdenebayaryn Shine-Od (MGL)	44:13
—	Kyan Low (SGP)	DNF
—	Yuya Kobayashi (JPN)	DNS

=== Women's individual ===
23 April

Rank	Athlete	Time
1st place, gold medalist(s)	Lin Xinyu (CHN)	31:34
2nd place, silver medalist(s)	Margot Garabedian (CAM)	32:00
3rd place, bronze medalist(s)	Lu Meiyi (CHN)	32:32
4	Chang Chi-wen (TPE)	33:26
5	Bailee Brown (HKG)	33:37
6	Lim Wan Ting (SGP)	33:51
7	Mao Shimazaki (JPN)	34:05
8	Hilda Choi (HKG)	34:18
9	Diana Yerzhanova (KAZ)	34:25
10	Kathlyn Yeo (SGP)	34:27
11	Lydia Musleh (JOR)	34:36
12	Esther Joy Chen (MAS)	34:52
13	Erika Burgos (PHI)	35:09
14	Hoi Long (MAC)	35:11
15	Raven Alcoseba (PHI)	35:23
16	Cindy Sui (MAS)	35:49
17	Aisika Kaewyongkod (THA)	36:18
18	Chang Chia-chia (TPE)	36:35
19	Ikumi Seto (JPN)	36:47
20	Aida Kim (KAZ)	37:28
21	Pichayanat Kittivorakij (THA)	37:33
22	Cheng Wan U (MAC)	38:06
23	Tatiana Kokina (KGZ)	38:50
24	Ralina Artykkhodzhaeva (KGZ)	39:58
25	Tsogiin Ayas (MGL)	52:23
26	Ayesha Waqas (PAK)	56:32
—	Phal Srey Phoung (CAM)	DSQ

=== Mixed relay ===
25 April

Rank	Team	Time
1st place, gold medalist(s)	China (CHN)	1:01:44
2nd place, silver medalist(s)	Hong Kong (HKG)	1:02:35
3rd place, bronze medalist(s)	Japan (JPN)	1:03:54
4	Kazakhstan (KAZ)	1:05:16
5	Philippines (PHI)	1:05:26
6	Chinese Taipei (TPE)	1:06:38
7	Malaysia (MAS)	1:07:48
8	Singapore (SGP)	1:08:29
9	Thailand (THA)	1:10:15
10	Kyrgyzstan (KGZ)	1:12:23
11	Macau (MAC)	1:14:29
