= 4x4 water polo at the 2026 Asian Beach Games =

Sports competition

- Venue: Haiyue Square Beach; Sanya Sports Centre Natatorium
- Dates: 22–29 April 2026

4x4 water polo (formerly known as beach water polo) competition at the 2026 Asian Beach Games took place at Haiyue Square in Sanya, China from 22 to 29 April 2026.

Heavy rains caused water polo games on 24 April to be moved indoors to Sanya Sports Centre Natatorium.

== Medalists ==
Event	Gold	Silver	Bronze
Men	Iran; Hamed Karimi; Alireza Mehri; Amin Ghavidel; Hossein Lalehsiah; Mehdi Yazdankhah; Arman Shams; Ashkan Iranpour	China; Zhang Yiwen; Cai Yuhao; He Xingmeng; Lü Zikang; Li Wanxiang; Li Diheng; Ouyang Haiyuan	Kazakhstan; Temirlan Balfanbayev; Eduard Tsoy; Sultan Shonzhigitov; Alexandr Yeremin; Ruslan Akhmetov; Aldiyar Akimbay; Murat Shakenov
Women	China; Yan Xintong; Xie Linshan; Ding Yinghua; Yin Yiting; Yang Shengxuan; Zhao Xinyi; Zhu Yinqi	Kazakhstan; Fatima Matkarimova; Ariadna Zatylnikova; Kamila Nauryzbayeva; Taira Mukhayeva; Yana Smolina; Vassilissa Antropova; Aida Alpysbay	Thailand; Patrapee Sridee; Pittayaporn Kwantongtanaree; Pimpin Ngamcharoensuktaworn; Sarocha Rueangsappaisan; Paranee Chotrotchanaanan; Thanita Kongchouy; Kanruetai Riangsuntea

== Medal table ==
Rank	Nation	Gold	Silver	Bronze	Total
1	China (CHN)	1	1	0	2
2	Iran (IRI)	1	0	0	1
3	Kazakhstan (KAZ)	0	1	1	2
4	Thailand (THA)	0	0	1	1
Totals (4 entries)		2	2	2	6

== Results ==
=== Men ===
Pos	Team	Pld	W	PW	PL	L	SF	SA	SD	Pts
1	Iran	5	3	2	0	0	15	5	+10	13
2	China	5	4	0	1	0	14	4	+10	13
3	Kazakhstan	5	2	1	1	1	11	9	+2	9
4	South Korea	5	2	0	0	3	7	11	−4	6
5	Hong Kong	5	1	0	1	3	7	12	−5	4
6	Thailand	5	0	0	0	5	2	15	−13	0

Source: Official website

25 April; 16:30	Report	Iran	3–1	Hong Kong	Haiyue Square Beach, Sanya; Referees: Kanit Sonthipakdee (THA)
25 April; 16:30	Report	Score by quarters: 4–3, 2–3, 3–2, 4–0			Haiyue Square Beach, Sanya; Referees: Kanit Sonthipakdee (THA)
25 April; 16:30	Report	Mehri 5	Goals	Cheng H.M., Fung 3	Haiyue Square Beach, Sanya; Referees: Kanit Sonthipakdee (THA)

25 April; 17:15	Report	Kazakhstan	3–1	Thailand	Haiyue Square Beach, Sanya; Referees: Tigran Simonyan (HKG)
25 April; 17:15	Report	Score by quarters: 5–2, 1–2, 7–0, 5–3			Haiyue Square Beach, Sanya; Referees: Tigran Simonyan (HKG)
25 April; 17:15	Report	Akhmetov 7	Goals	Chainiyom 3	Haiyue Square Beach, Sanya; Referees: Tigran Simonyan (HKG)

25 April; 18:00	Report	China	3–1	South Korea	Haiyue Square Beach, Sanya; Referees: Shahrouz Sharifian (IRI)
25 April; 18:00	Report	Score by quarters: 3–2, 3–0, 1–3, 2–1			Haiyue Square Beach, Sanya; Referees: Shahrouz Sharifian (IRI)
25 April; 18:00	Report	Ouyang 3	Goals	Gwon, Han 2	Haiyue Square Beach, Sanya; Referees: Shahrouz Sharifian (IRI)

26 April; 16:30	Report	Hong Kong	2–3 (PSO)	Kazakhstan	Haiyue Square Beach, Sanya; Referees: Zhang Liang (CHN)
26 April; 16:30	Report	Score by quarters: 1–4, 2–6, 3–2, 1–0 PSO: 1–2			Haiyue Square Beach, Sanya; Referees: Zhang Liang (CHN)
26 April; 16:30	Report	Cheng H.M. 7	Goals	Tsoy, Akhmetov 4	Haiyue Square Beach, Sanya; Referees: Zhang Liang (CHN)

26 April; 17:15	Report	South Korea	0–3	Iran	Haiyue Square Beach, Sanya; Referees: Rastko Prlić (SRB)
26 April; 17:15	Report	Score by quarters: 3–4, 2–3, 2–5, X			Haiyue Square Beach, Sanya; Referees: Rastko Prlić (SRB)
26 April; 17:15	Report	Son 3	Goals	Ghavidel, Shams 3	Haiyue Square Beach, Sanya; Referees: Rastko Prlić (SRB)

26 April; 18:00	Report	China	3–0	Thailand	Haiyue Square Beach, Sanya; Referees: Jaume Teixidó (ESP)
26 April; 18:00	Report	Score by quarters: 5–2, 2–1, 2–1, X			Haiyue Square Beach, Sanya; Referees: Jaume Teixidó (ESP)
26 April; 18:00	Report	Li W., Ouyang 3	Goals	Kaewmanee 2	Haiyue Square Beach, Sanya; Referees: Jaume Teixidó (ESP)

27 April; 16:30	Report	Iran	3–2 (PSO)	Kazakhstan	Haiyue Square Beach, Sanya; Referees: Jaume Teixidó (ESP)
27 April; 16:30	Report	Score by quarters: 1–2, 4–5, 3–2, 2–1 PSO: 3–2			Haiyue Square Beach, Sanya; Referees: Jaume Teixidó (ESP)
27 April; 16:30	Report	Iranpour 6	Goals	Tsoy, Akimbay 3	Haiyue Square Beach, Sanya; Referees: Jaume Teixidó (ESP)

27 April; 17:15	Report	South Korea	3–1	Thailand	Haiyue Square Beach, Sanya; Referees: Tigran Simonyan (HKG)
27 April; 17:15	Report	Score by quarters: 0–4, 7–3, 5–3, 5–3			Haiyue Square Beach, Sanya; Referees: Tigran Simonyan (HKG)
27 April; 17:15	Report	Gwon 6	Goals	Kaewmanee, Chainiyom 4	Haiyue Square Beach, Sanya; Referees: Tigran Simonyan (HKG)

27 April; 18:00	Report	China	3–0	Hong Kong	Haiyue Square Beach, Sanya; Referees: Shahrouz Sharifian (IRI)
27 April; 18:00	Report	Score by quarters: 4–3, 3–0, 3–1, X			Haiyue Square Beach, Sanya; Referees: Shahrouz Sharifian (IRI)
27 April; 18:00	Report	Cai 4	Goals	Cheng H.C., Cheng H.M. 2	Haiyue Square Beach, Sanya; Referees: Shahrouz Sharifian (IRI)

28 April; 17:00	Report	Thailand	0–3	Iran	Haiyue Square Beach, Sanya; Referees: Tigran Simonyan (HKG)
28 April; 17:00	Report	Score by quarters: 2–4, 1–6, 4–5, X			Haiyue Square Beach, Sanya; Referees: Tigran Simonyan (HKG)
28 April; 17:00	Report	Kaewmanee, Chainiyom 3	Goals	Shams 6	Haiyue Square Beach, Sanya; Referees: Tigran Simonyan (HKG)

28 April; 17:45	Report	Hong Kong	1–3	South Korea	Haiyue Square Beach, Sanya; Referees: Zhang Liang (CHN)
28 April; 17:45	Report	Score by quarters: 2–4, 2–4, 3–2, 3–4			Haiyue Square Beach, Sanya; Referees: Zhang Liang (CHN)
28 April; 17:45	Report	Cheng H.M. 7	Goals	Han 6	Haiyue Square Beach, Sanya; Referees: Zhang Liang (CHN)

28 April; 18:30	Report	China	3–0	Kazakhstan	Haiyue Square Beach, Sanya; Referees: Rastko Prlić (SRB)
28 April; 18:30	Report	Score by quarters: 3–2, 3–1, 2–1, X			Haiyue Square Beach, Sanya; Referees: Rastko Prlić (SRB)
28 April; 18:30	Report	Li W. 3	Goals	Akhmetov 3	Haiyue Square Beach, Sanya; Referees: Rastko Prlić (SRB)

29 April; 8:00	Report	Thailand	0–3	Hong Kong	Haiyue Square Beach, Sanya; Referees: Rastko Prlić (SRB)
29 April; 8:00	Report	Score by quarters: 4–6, 2–4, 1–3, X			Haiyue Square Beach, Sanya; Referees: Rastko Prlić (SRB)
29 April; 8:00	Report	Kaewmanee 4	Goals	Zhang 7	Haiyue Square Beach, Sanya; Referees: Rastko Prlić (SRB)

29 April; 8:45	Report	Kazakhstan	3–0	South Korea	Haiyue Square Beach, Sanya; Referees: Zhang Liang (CHN)
29 April; 8:45	Report	Score by quarters: 4–2, 2–1, 3–2, X			Haiyue Square Beach, Sanya; Referees: Zhang Liang (CHN)
29 April; 8:45	Report	Akhmetov 4	Goals	Son 2	Haiyue Square Beach, Sanya; Referees: Zhang Liang (CHN)

29 April; 9:30	Report	China	2–3 (PSO)	Iran	Haiyue Square Beach, Sanya; Referees: Jaume Teixidó (ESP)
29 April; 9:30	Report	Score by quarters: 2–1, 2–3, 1–4, 3–2 PSO: 2–3			Haiyue Square Beach, Sanya; Referees: Jaume Teixidó (ESP)
29 April; 9:30	Report	Cai 4	Goals	Shams 4	Haiyue Square Beach, Sanya; Referees: Jaume Teixidó (ESP)

=== Women ===
Pos	Team	Pld	W	PW	PL	L	SF	SA	SD	Pts
1	China	3	3	0	0	0	9	2	+7	9
2	Kazakhstan	3	1	1	0	1	7	6	+1	5
3	Thailand	3	0	1	1	1	5	8	−3	3
4	Hong Kong	3	0	0	1	2	4	9	−5	1

Source: Official website

22 April; 9:30	Report	Kazakhstan	3–2 (PSO)	Thailand	Haiyue Square Beach, Sanya; Referees: Jaume Teixidó (ESP)
22 April; 9:30	Report	Score by quarters: 6–3, 1–2, 1–2, 2–1 PSO: 2–0			Haiyue Square Beach, Sanya; Referees: Jaume Teixidó (ESP)
22 April; 9:30	Report	Smolina, Antropova 3	Goals	Kwantongtanaree 4	Haiyue Square Beach, Sanya; Referees: Jaume Teixidó (ESP)

22 April; 10:15	Report	China	3–1	Hong Kong	Haiyue Square Beach, Sanya; Referees: An Jin-yong (KOR)
22 April; 10:15	Report	Score by quarters: 1–2, 4–0, 4–0, 7–1			Haiyue Square Beach, Sanya; Referees: An Jin-yong (KOR)
22 April; 10:15	Report	Xie 7	Goals	Ho 2	Haiyue Square Beach, Sanya; Referees: An Jin-yong (KOR)

23 April; 16:15	Report	Hong Kong	1–3	Kazakhstan	Haiyue Square Beach, Sanya; Referees: Zhang Liang (CHN)
23 April; 16:15	Report	Score by quarters: 0–2, 1–3, 4–2, 1–3			Haiyue Square Beach, Sanya; Referees: Zhang Liang (CHN)
23 April; 16:15	Report	Ng 3	Goals	Mukhayeva, Alpysbay 4	Haiyue Square Beach, Sanya; Referees: Zhang Liang (CHN)

23 April; 17:00	Report	China	3–0	Thailand	Haiyue Square Beach, Sanya; Referees: Rastko Prlić (SRB)
23 April; 17:00	Report	Score by quarters: 2–0, 7–1, 4–0, X			Haiyue Square Beach, Sanya; Referees: Rastko Prlić (SRB)
23 April; 17:00	Report	Xie 8	Goals	Kwantongtanaree 1	Haiyue Square Beach, Sanya; Referees: Rastko Prlić (SRB)

24 April; 20:00	Report	Thailand	3–2 (PSO)	Hong Kong	Sports Centre Natatorium, Sanya; Referees: Azat Bolatov (KAZ)
24 April; 20:00	Report	Score by quarters: 2–1, 3–2, 1–2, 1–2 PSO: 1–0			Sports Centre Natatorium, Sanya; Referees: Azat Bolatov (KAZ)
24 April; 20:00	Report	Chotrotchanaanan 3	Goals	Ng 3	Sports Centre Natatorium, Sanya; Referees: Azat Bolatov (KAZ)

24 April; 21:15	Report	China	3–1	Kazakhstan	Sports Centre Natatorium, Sanya; Referees: Jaume Teixidó (ESP)
24 April; 21:15	Report	Score by quarters: 4–1, 3–4, 4–0, 4–3			Sports Centre Natatorium, Sanya; Referees: Jaume Teixidó (ESP)
24 April; 21:15	Report	Yin 6	Goals	Mukhayeva, Alpysbay 2	Sports Centre Natatorium, Sanya; Referees: Jaume Teixidó (ESP)
