= Brunei at the 2026 Asian Beach Games =

- IOC code: BRU
- NOC: Brunei Darussalam National Olympic Council
- Website: www.bruneiolympic.org (in English)

in Sanya, China 22–30 April 2026
- Competitors: 4 in 2 sports
- Medals: Gold 0 Silver 0 Bronze 0 Total 0

Asian Beach Games appearances
- 2008; 2010; 2012; 2014; 2016; 2026

Brunei competed in the 2026 Asian Beach Games in Sanya, Hainan, China from 22 to 30 April 2026. This marks the return of the Asian Beach Games, ten years since the 2016 edition in Da Nang, Vietnam.

Brunei sent a 10-person delegation; four of which are athletes competing in beach athletics and teqball. Pengiran Abdul Raub Pengiran Ghani is the chef de mission.

== Beach athletics ==
Abdul Aqil Abdul Kadir and Qurratul Ain Irwan finished last among thirteen jumpers in their respective long jump events.

Athlete	Event	Final	
Athlete	Event	Result	Rank
Abdul Aqil Abdul Kadir	Men's long jump	5.25	13
Qurratul Ain Irwan	Women's long jump	4.40	13

== Teqball ==
The participation of Ismail Ang and Mohammad Hanis Hidayatullah Abdullah in the men's double event of the 2026 Asian Beach Games marks Brunei's first participation in international Teqball. They failed to progress to the quarterfinals.

Team	Event	Group stage			Quarterfinals	Semifinal	Final / BM
Team	Event	Opposition Score	Opposition Score	Rank	Opposition Score	Opposition Score	Rank
Ismail Ang; Mohammad Hanis Hidayatullah Abdullah	Men's Doubles	Ali / Abdulrahman (IRQ); L 0–2	Ri / Kim (PRK); L 0–2	3	Did not advance		
