= Sanya River =

Coordinates: 18.25027°N 109.50962°E

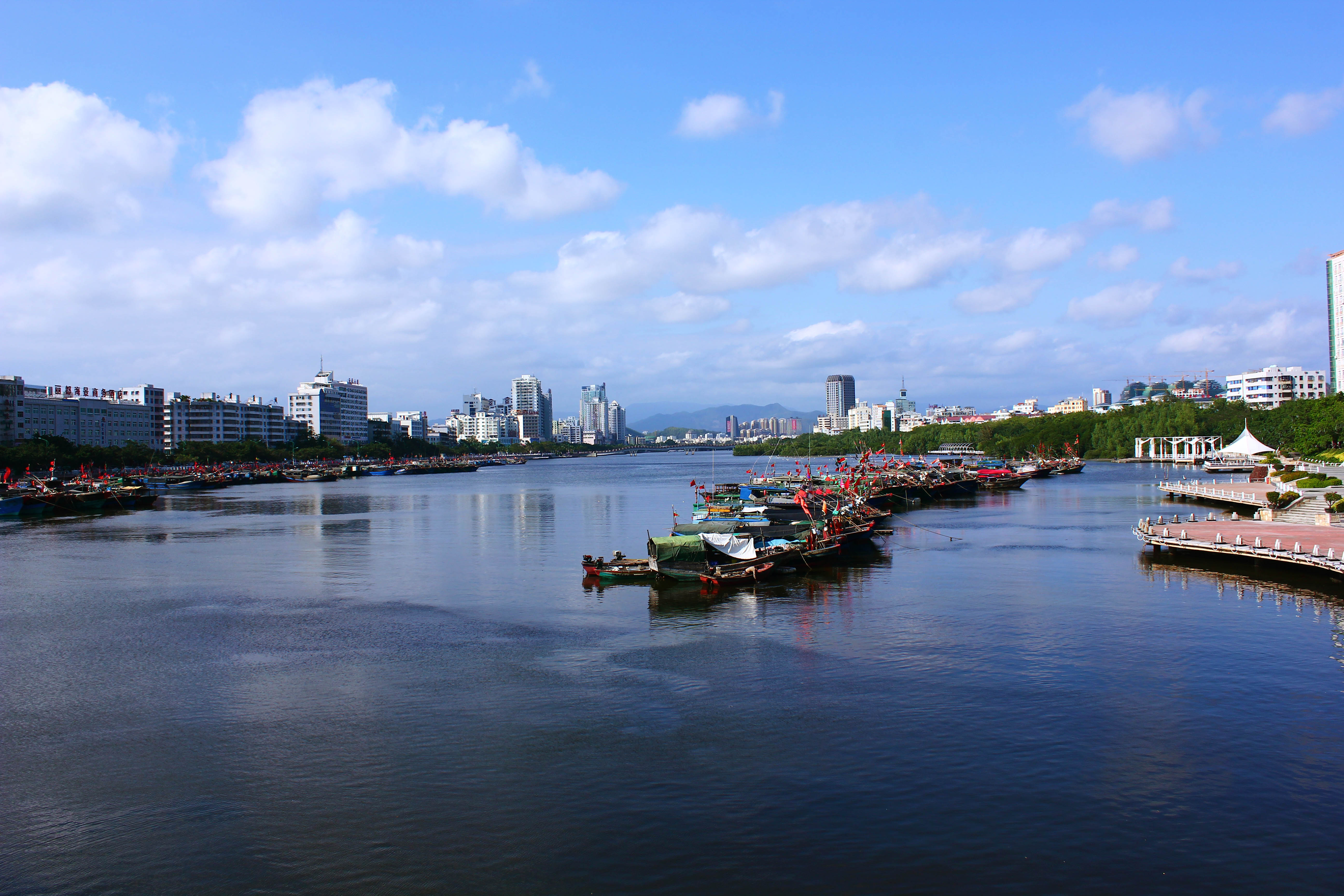
- Native name: 三亚河 (Chinese)

Location
- Country: China

Physical characteristics
- Mouth
  - location: Sanya Bay
- Basin size: Shuiyaunchi Reservoir

Sanya River (Chinese: 三亚河) is located in the southern part of Hainan Province, China. It runs from the Shuiyaunchi Reservoir south through Sanya where it discharges into Sanya Bay.
