= Beach handball at the 2026 Asian Beach Games =

- Venue: Tianya Haijiao
- Dates: 21–30 April 2026

The Beach handball competition at the 2026 Asian Beach Games took place at Tianya Haijiao in Sanya, China from 21 to 30 April 2026. Iran won the men's gold medal while Vietnam finished first in the women's competition.

== Medalists ==
| Event | Gold | Silver | Bronze |
|---|---|---|---|
| Men | Iran; Arad Hosseini; Hossein Heidarian; Parsa Dehghani; Mohammad Mehdi Heidarianpour; Ali Heidarian; Ali Shirani; Matin Goldan; Alireza Alipour; Alireza Pirzadeh; Amin Kazemi | Qatar; Žarko Marković; Mutasem Mohamed; Abdulrazzaq Murad; Rasheed Yusuff; Amir Denguir; Abdelhady El-Namr; Hani Kakhi; Anis Zouaoui; Hamdi Ayed; Ahmed El-Meniawy | Thailand; Sudthawee Prueprak; Manatsanan Panyajae; Suchol Sawaengsin; Kittipong Ruksawong; Nutdanai Ruksawong; Passakorn Srinamkham; Theephop Puapan; Open Kannarong; Anuthep Sanitpoj; Fifa Kannarong |
| Women | Vietnam; Nguyễn Thị Nhung; Lư Ngọc Trinh; Nguyễn Thị Phùng Linh; Phạm Thị Mỹ Hằng; Hà Thị Hạnh; Đàm Thị Thanh Huyền; Nguyễn Thị Ánh Tuyết; Nguyễn Thị Thùy Dung; Trần Hải Yến; Nguyễn Thị Trà My | China; Pan Yi; Zhao Ye; Shen Ping; Liu Chenmeng; Pang Jiaye; Li Weiyu; Wang Qixin; Zhang Xiaomei; Fan Chunyan; Li Rui | Thailand; Ploysouy Dernribram; Angkana Wongsason; Sasithorn Onnon; Niphaphon Pansopa; Kittiyakorn Tapa; Rujira Khrueasri; Thamonwan Thongthirat; Nittaya Joisakoo; Saranya Saetang; Namfon Jittoedsak |

== Medal table ==
| Rank | Nation | Gold | Silver | Bronze | Total |
|---|---|---|---|---|---|
| 1 | Iran (IRI) | 1 | 0 | 0 | 1 |
| 1 | Vietnam (VIE) | 1 | 0 | 0 | 1 |
| 3 | China (CHN) | 0 | 1 | 0 | 1 |
| 3 | Qatar (QAT) | 0 | 1 | 0 | 1 |
| 5 | Thailand (THA) | 0 | 0 | 2 | 2 |
| Totals (5 entries) | | 2 | 2 | 2 | 6 |

== Results ==
=== Men ===
==== Preliminary round ====
===== Group A =====
| Pos | Team | Pld | W | L | SF | SA | SD | Pts |
|---|---|---|---|---|---|---|---|---|
| 1 | Iran | 5 | 5 | 0 | 10 | 0 | +10 | 10 |
| 2 | Bahrain | 5 | 4 | 1 | 8 | 3 | +5 | 8 |
| 3 | China | 5 | 3 | 2 | 6 | 5 | +1 | 6 |
| 4 | Philippines | 5 | 2 | 3 | 6 | 6 | 0 | 4 |
| 5 | Hong Kong | 5 | 1 | 4 | 2 | 9 | −7 | 2 |
| 6 | Sri Lanka | 5 | 0 | 5 | 1 | 10 | −9 | 0 |

Source: AHF

| Date | Time | | Score | | Period 1 | Period 2 | SO |
|---|---|---|---|---|---|---|---|
| 21 Apr | 11:00 | Philippines | 2–0 | Hong Kong | 20–18 | 28–16 | |
| 21 Apr | 12:00 | China | 0–2 | Bahrain | 8–14 | 14–15 | |
| 21 Apr | 16:00 | Iran | 2–0 | Philippines | 14–10 | 21–20 | |
| 21 Apr | 18:00 | China | 2–0 | Sri Lanka | 18–8 | 20–8 | |
| 23 Apr | 10:00 | Bahrain | 2–1 | Philippines | 16–17 | 21–20 | 18–16 |
| 23 Apr | 17:00 | Sri Lanka | 1–2 | Hong Kong | 12–13 | 16–6 | 8–9 |
| 24 Apr | 11:00 | Sri Lanka | 0–2 | Iran | 12–18 | 10–22 | |
| 24 Apr | 17:00 | Hong Kong | 0–2 | China | 14–16 | 18–19 | |
| 24 Apr | 18:00 | Bahrain | 2–0 | Sri Lanka | 18–14 | 10–6 | |
| 26 Apr | 10:00 | Iran | 2–0 | Hong Kong | 13–8 | 20–6 | |
| 26 Apr | 11:00 | Philippines | 1–2 | China | 21–20 | 12–20 | 6–10 |
| 26 Apr | 16:00 | Iran | 2–0 | Bahrain | 18–16 | 18–16 | |
| 26 Apr | 18:00 | Philippines | 2–0 | Sri Lanka | 17–16 | 26–24 | |
| 27 Apr | 11:00 | Hong Kong | 0–2 | Bahrain | 6–16 | 10–16 | |
| 27 Apr | 16:00 | China | 0–2 | Iran | 14–21 | 10–20 | |

===== Group B =====
| Pos | Team | Pld | W | L | SF | SA | SD | Pts |
|---|---|---|---|---|---|---|---|---|
| 1 | Qatar | 7 | 7 | 0 | 14 | 0 | +14 | 14 |
| 2 | Thailand | 7 | 6 | 1 | 12 | 3 | +9 | 12 |
| 3 | Oman | 7 | 5 | 2 | 10 | 4 | +6 | 10 |
| 4 | Jordan | 7 | 4 | 3 | 8 | 6 | +2 | 8 |
| 5 | Pakistan | 7 | 3 | 4 | 7 | 8 | −1 | 6 |
| 6 | Maldives | 7 | 2 | 5 | 4 | 12 | −8 | 4 |
| 7 | Bangladesh | 7 | 1 | 6 | 3 | 12 | −9 | 2 |
| 8 | Mongolia | 7 | 0 | 7 | 1 | 14 | −13 | 0 |

Source: AHF

| Date | Time | | Score | | Period 1 | Period 2 | SO |
|---|---|---|---|---|---|---|---|
| 21 Apr | 10:00 | Jordan | 0–2 | Thailand | 18–20 | 10–14 | |
| 21 Apr | 11:00 | Pakistan | 0–2 | Qatar | 14–17 | 16–19 | |
| 21 Apr | 12:00 | Maldives | 2–1 | Bangladesh | 12–21 | 23–22 | 7–4 |
| 21 Apr | 16:00 | Oman | 2–0 | Mongolia | 22–4 | 22–13 | |
| 21 Apr | 17:00 | Jordan | 2–0 | Maldives | 14–6 | 16–13 | |
| 21 Apr | 18:00 | Pakistan | 2–0 | Bangladesh | 24–16 | 22–18 | |
| 21 Apr | 19:00 | Mongolia | 0–2 | Thailand | 6–18 | 6–17 | |
| 21 Apr | 19:00 | Oman | 0–2 | Qatar | 14–20 | 14–18 | |
| 23 Apr | 11:00 | Qatar | 2–0 | Bangladesh | 16–6 | 24–12 | |
| 23 Apr | 12:00 | Mongolia | 1–2 | Maldives | 13–11 | 9–13 | 6–8 |
| 23 Apr | 16:00 | Pakistan | 0–2 | Jordan | 10–14 | 18–19 | |
| 23 Apr | 16:00 | Oman | 0–2 | Thailand | 12–13 | 14–16 | |
| 23 Apr | 18:00 | Qatar | 2–0 | Mongolia | 26–13 | 24–9 | |
| 24 Apr | 10:00 | Bangladesh | 0–2 | Jordan | 12–19 | 6–14 | |
| 24 Apr | 11:00 | Thailand | 2–1 | Pakistan | 22–20 | 20–23 | 10–8 |
| 24 Apr | 12:00 | Oman | 2–0 | Maldives | 22–10 | 16–12 | |
| 24 Apr | 17:00 | Mongolia | 0–2 | Pakistan | 17–24 | 10–24 | |
| 24 Apr | 18:00 | Qatar | 2–0 | Jordan | 22–18 | 18–16 | |
| 24 Apr | 19:00 | Thailand | 2–0 | Maldives | 22–12 | 18–12 | |
| 26 Apr | 11:00 | Oman | 2–0 | Bangladesh | 20–8 | 21–18 | |
| 26 Apr | 12:00 | Thailand | 0–2 | Qatar | 20–26 | 20–22 | |
| 26 Apr | 16:00 | Maldives | 0–2 | Pakistan | 12–20 | 12–18 | |
| 26 Apr | 17:00 | Bangladesh | 2–0 | Mongolia | 22–17 | 24–6 | |
| 26 Apr | 17:00 | Oman | 2–0 | Jordan | 11–10 | 12–10 | |
| 27 Apr | 10:00 | Bangladesh | 0–2 | Thailand | 16–19 | 6–18 | |
| 27 Apr | 11:00 | Maldives | 0–2 | Qatar | 12–26 | 12–18 | |
| 27 Apr | 12:00 | Jordan | 2–0 | Mongolia | 33–14 | 27–7 | |
| 27 Apr | 17:00 | Oman | 2–0 | Pakistan | 15–12 | 19–14 | |

==== Final round ====
Semifinals
28 April
Iran | 2
Thailand | 1
28 April
Qatar | 2
Bahrain | 0

Gold medal game
29 April
Iran | 2
Qatar | 1
Bronze medal game
29 April
Thailand | 2
Bahrain | 0

===== Semifinals =====
| Date | Time | | Score | | Period 1 | Period 2 | SO |
|---|---|---|---|---|---|---|---|
| 28 Apr | 18:00 | Iran | 2–1 | Thailand | 19–16 | 16–18 | 8–6 |
| 28 Apr | 19:00 | Qatar | 2–0 | Bahrain | 13–8 | 20–18 | |

===== Bronze medal game =====
| Date | Time | | Score | | Period 1 | Period 2 | SO |
|---|---|---|---|---|---|---|---|
| 29 Apr | 20:00 | Thailand | 2–0 | Bahrain | 18–16 | 23–18 | |

===== Gold medal game =====
| Date | Time | | Score | | Period 1 | Period 2 | SO |
|---|---|---|---|---|---|---|---|
| 29 Apr | 21:00 | Iran | 2–1 | Qatar | 18–10 | 10–15 | 9–6 |

=== Women ===
==== Preliminary round ====
===== Group A =====
| Pos | Team | Pld | W | L | SF | SA | SD | Pts |
|---|---|---|---|---|---|---|---|---|
| 1 | Vietnam | 3 | 3 | 0 | 6 | 0 | +6 | 6 |
| 2 | Thailand | 3 | 2 | 1 | 4 | 4 | 0 | 4 |
| 3 | Hong Kong | 3 | 1 | 2 | 3 | 4 | −1 | 2 |
| 4 | Philippines | 3 | 0 | 3 | 1 | 6 | −5 | 0 |

Source: AHF

| Date | Time | | Score | | Period 1 | Period 2 | SO |
|---|---|---|---|---|---|---|---|
| 23 Apr | 11:00 | Hong Kong | 2–0 | Philippines | 18–12 | 16–12 | |
| 23 Apr | 17:00 | Thailand | 0–2 | Vietnam | 16–20 | 18–22 | |
| 24 Apr | 12:00 | Thailand | 2–1 | Philippines | 12–14 | 18–10 | 9–8 |
| 24 Apr | 16:00 | Hong Kong | 0–2 | Vietnam | 6–16 | 10–12 | |
| 26 Apr | 18:00 | Hong Kong | 1–2 | Thailand | 19–18 | 11–21 | 4–7 |
| 27 Apr | 16:00 | Vietnam | 2–0 | Philippines | 24–16 | 22–12 | |

===== Group B =====
| Pos | Team | Pld | W | L | SF | SA | SD | Pts |
|---|---|---|---|---|---|---|---|---|
| 1 | China | 3 | 3 | 0 | 6 | 0 | +6 | 6 |
| 2 | Turkmenistan | 3 | 2 | 1 | 4 | 3 | +1 | 4 |
| 3 | Sri Lanka | 3 | 1 | 2 | 2 | 4 | −2 | 2 |
| 4 | Mongolia | 3 | 0 | 3 | 1 | 6 | −5 | 0 |

Source: AHF

| Date | Time | | Score | | Period 1 | Period 2 | SO |
|---|---|---|---|---|---|---|---|
| 23 Apr | 12:00 | Mongolia | 0–2 | China | 6–18 | 6–30 | |
| 23 Apr | 18:00 | Sri Lanka | 0–2 | China | 8–26 | 6–20 | |
| 24 Apr | 16:00 | Sri Lanka | 0–2 | Turkmenistan | 10–12 | 4–8 | |
| 26 Apr | 10:00 | Mongolia | 0–2 | Sri Lanka | 15–18 | 4–16 | |
| 26 Apr | 12:00 | Turkmenistan | 0–2 | China | 3–16 | 13–22 | |
| 27 Apr | 10:00 | Mongolia | 1–2 | Turkmenistan | 16–14 | 10–12 | 4–10 |

==== Final round ====
Semifinals
28 April
Vietnam | 2
Turkmenistan | 0
28 April
China | 2
Thailand | 1

Gold medal game
30 April
Vietnam | 2
China | 1
Bronze medal game
30 April
Turkmenistan | 0
Thailand | 2

===== Semifinals =====
| Date | Time | | Score | | Period 1 | Period 2 | SO |
|---|---|---|---|---|---|---|---|
| 28 Apr | 16:00 | Vietnam | 2–0 | Turkmenistan | 22–18 | 30–17 | |
| 28 Apr | 17:00 | China | 2–1 | Thailand | 16–14 | 20–22 | 20–18 |

===== Bronze medal game =====
| Date | Time | | Score | | Period 1 | Period 2 | SO |
|---|---|---|---|---|---|---|---|
| 30 Apr | 10:00 | Turkmenistan | 0–2 | Thailand | 8–15 | 8–22 | |

===== Gold medal game =====
| Date | Time | | Score | | Period 1 | Period 2 | SO |
|---|---|---|---|---|---|---|---|
| 30 Apr | 11:00 | Vietnam | 2–1 | China | 20–18 | 20–21 | 9–6 |
