= Azenhas do Mar =

- Village
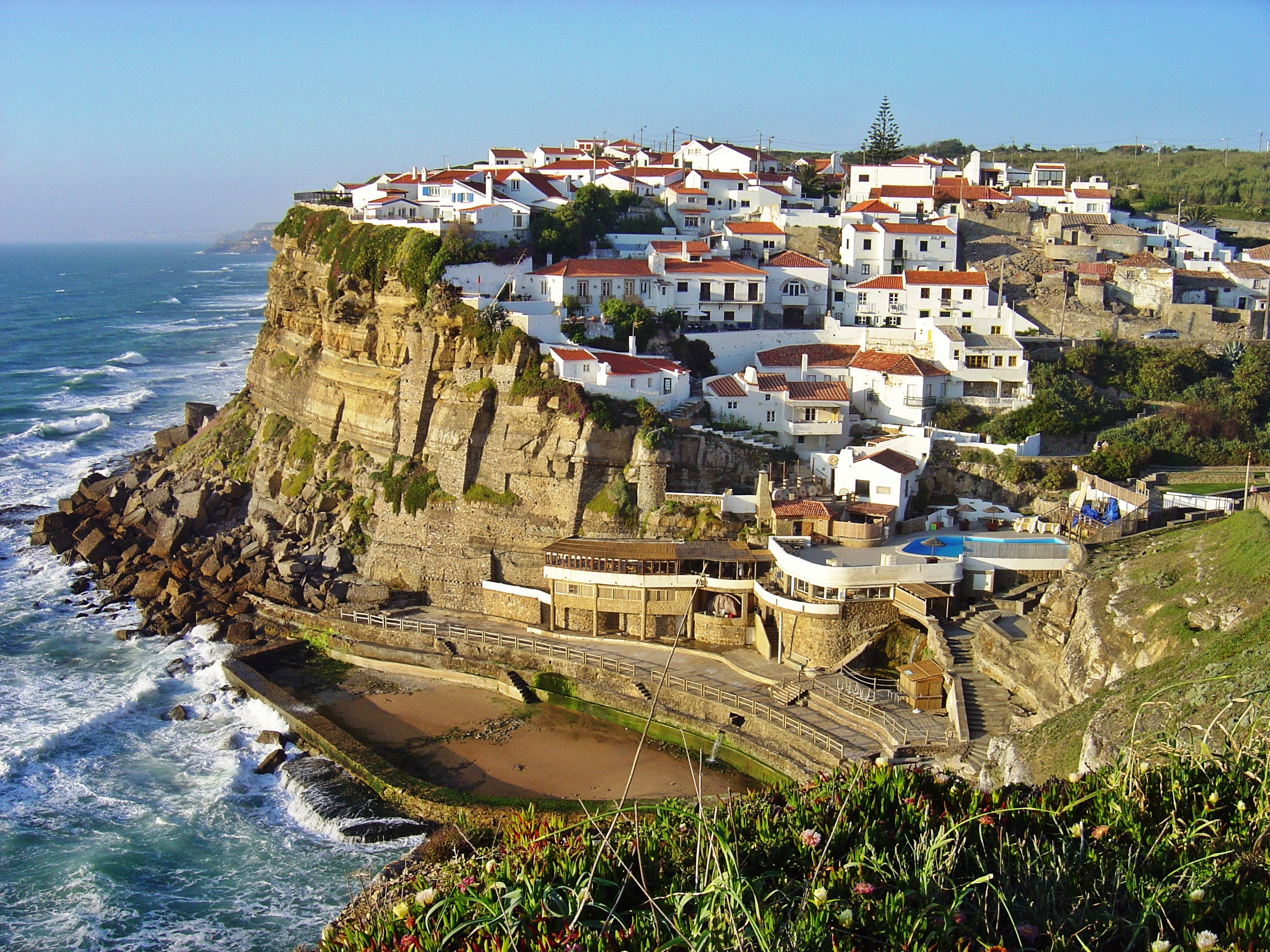
- View of Azenhas do Mar

- Location in Portugal
- Coordinates: 38°50′26″N 9°27′36″W
- Country: Portugal
- Region: Lisboa
- Metropolitan area: Lisbon
- District: Lisbon
- Municipality: Sintra
- Parish: Colares

Population (2017)
  - Total: 451
- Time zone: UTC±00:00 (WET)
  - Summer (DST): UTC+01:00 (WEST)

Azenhas do Mar (Portuguese pronunciation: [ɐˈzeɲɐʒ ðu ˈmaɾ]) is a seaside village in the civil parish of Colares, Sintra, Portugal. It is situated on a cliff along the Atlantic Ocean, about 30 km (19 mi) northwest of Lisbon, within the Sintra-Cascais Natural Park. As of 2017, it had 451 inhabitants. The name Azenhas do Mar literally means “Watermills of the Sea,” referring to the watermills that once operated along the nearby Cameijo Creek to grind wheat. In the 20th century, Azenhas do Mar became a seaside resort, known for its picturesque cliffside houses.

== History ==
Azenhas do Mar developed as a coastal settlement within the Colares wine region, with its early economy based on grain milling, viticulture and fishing. The village takes its name from the watermills (azenhas) that once operated along the Cameijo Creek (Ribeira do Cameijo) to grind wheat. The oldest of these may date back to the islamic period and their remnants are still visible among the village's houses and gardens.

Wine production in Azenhas dates back to the 19th century, with records from 1848 mentioning local producers such as Luís Augusto and Manuel José Collares. In 1899 members of the Chitas family acquired several of these cellars and established the firm Collares Chitas. In 1900, António Bernardino da Silva Chitas founded Adega Beira Mar, which continues to produce Colares wine today. The surrounding vineyards, primarily planted with the Ramisco grape, are notable for having survived the phylloxera plague that devastated European viticulture in the late 19th century, thanks to the region’s sandy soils.

The village was not a notable seaside destination until the 20th century and was absent from an 1876 guide to Portuguese beaches by Ramalho Ortigão. Its popularity grew in the early 20th century, becoming a favored retreat for the Portuguese bourgeoisie and attracting visitors such as King Carlos I and Queens Amélia and Maria Pia. The village expanded during the 20th century, leading to an increase in the number of houses built along the cliffside. This included a holiday house by Raul Lino from 1920, reflecting his interpretation of traditional Portuguese architecture.

The extension of the Sintra tramway from Praia das Maçãs to Azenhas do Mar in 1930 accelerated the development of Azenhas do Mar as a seaside resort. According to local tradition, the opening was marked by a large celebration during which a resident, José Henriques Totta, arranged for a nearby fountain to flow with Colares wine instead of water. The tram line operated until 1955, when the section between Praia das Maçãs and Azenhas do Mar was closed due to declining use.

== Geography ==
Azenhas do Mar is on a cliff by the Atlantic Ocean in the civil parish of Colares, in Sintra municipality. It is 30 km (19 mi) northwest of Lisbon and part of its metropolitan area. Azenhas do Mar is located north of Cabo da Roca and it a part of Sintra-Cascais Natural Park. It is located less than 2 kilometres (1.2 mi) north of Praia das Maçãs, where there is a prehistoric monument known as the Tholos of Outeiro das Mós.

== Landmarks ==
Notable historical structures include the Chapel of Saint Lawrence (Capela de São Lourenço), dating from the late 16th century and a school constructed in 1927 and inaugurated by President Óscar Carmona. The school later served as a model for school architecture during the Estado Novo period.

There is a beach at the base of the cliff in Azenhas do Mar, where there is also man-made pool dating back to the middle of the 20th century. There are other beaches located near the Azenhas do Mar, including Praia da Aguda, Praia do Magoito and Praia das Maçãs.

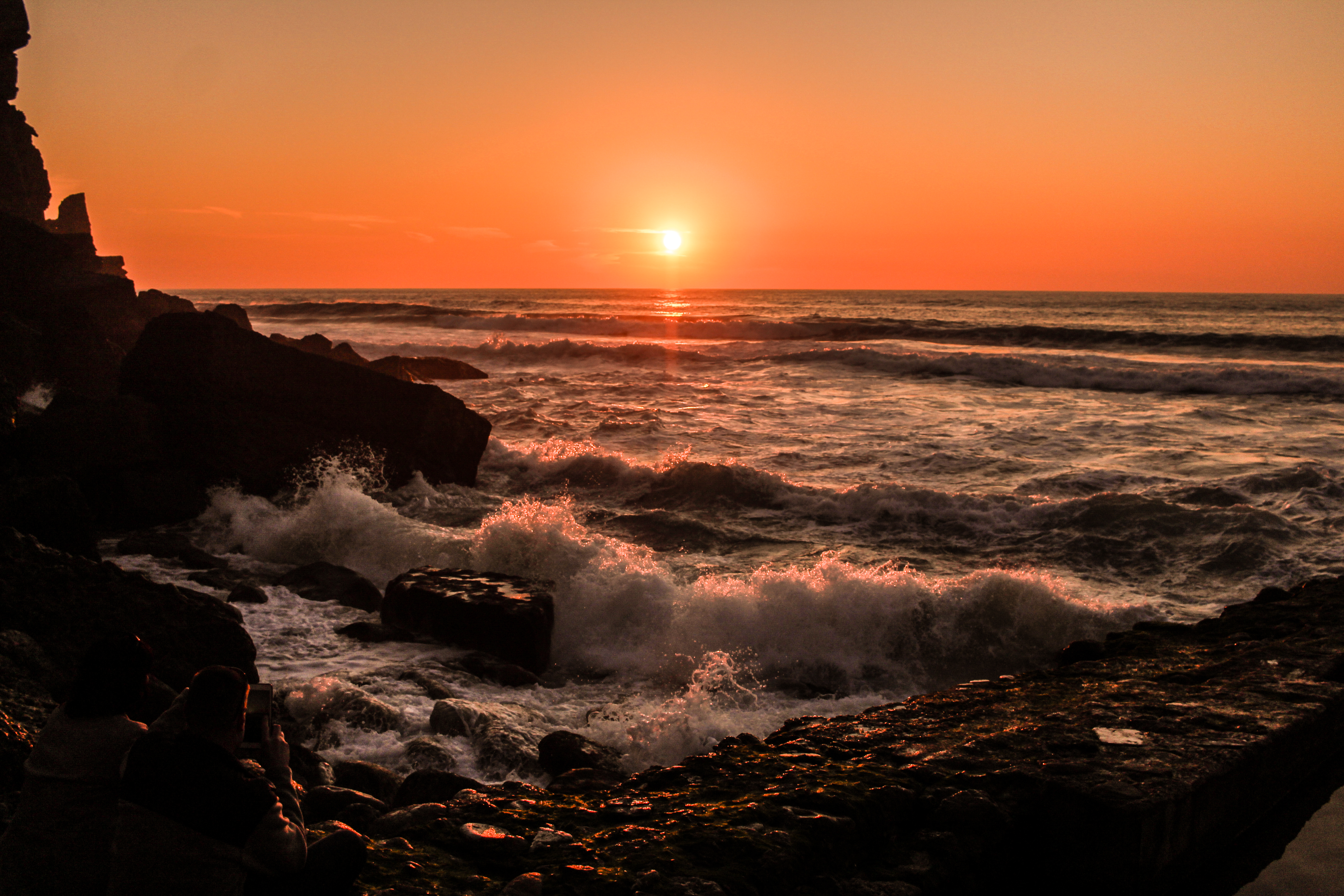
Beach sunset

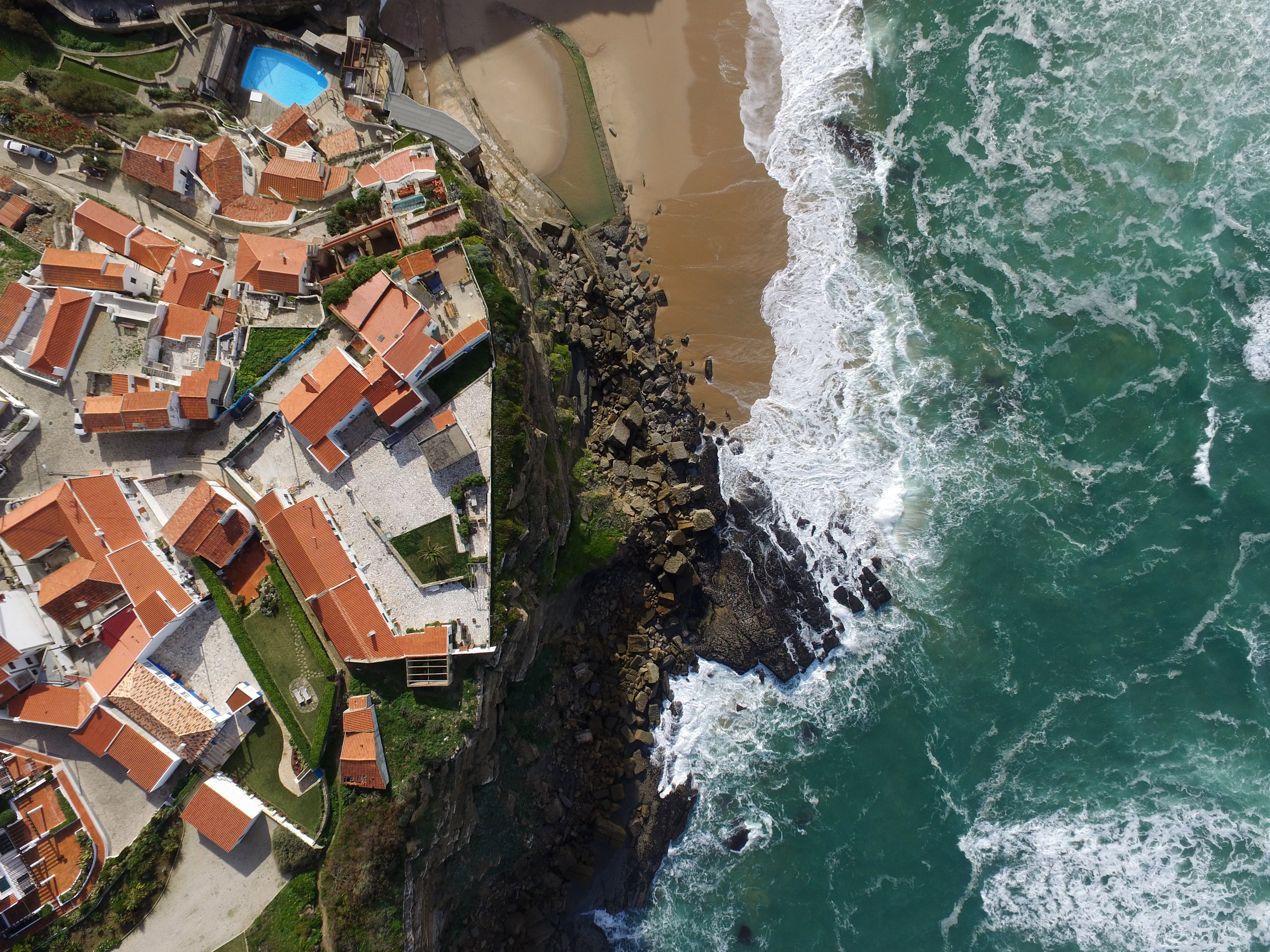
Azenhas do Mar by drone

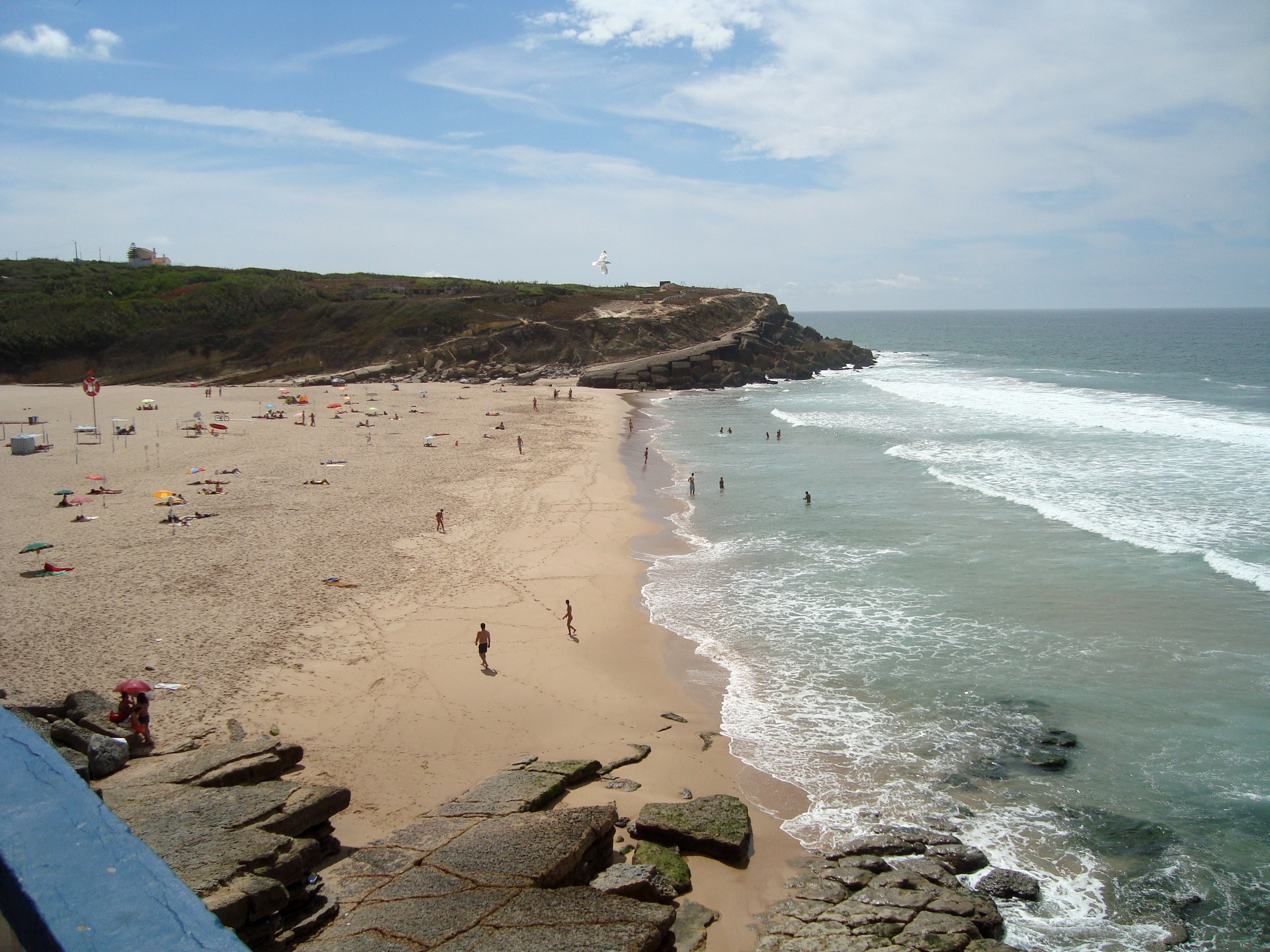
Praia das Maçãs
