= Azoia =

Azoia or Azóia may refer to:

- Azoia, Leiria, a freguesia in the municipality of Leiria, Portugal
- Azóia, Sesimbra, a town in the municipality of Sesimbra, Portugal
- Azóia, Sintra, a village in the municipality of Sintra, Portugal
- Santa Iria de Azoia, a town in the municipality of Loures, Portugal
