= Tianya Haijiao =

Beach resort in Hainan, China

Coordinates: 18.2911°N 109.3472°E

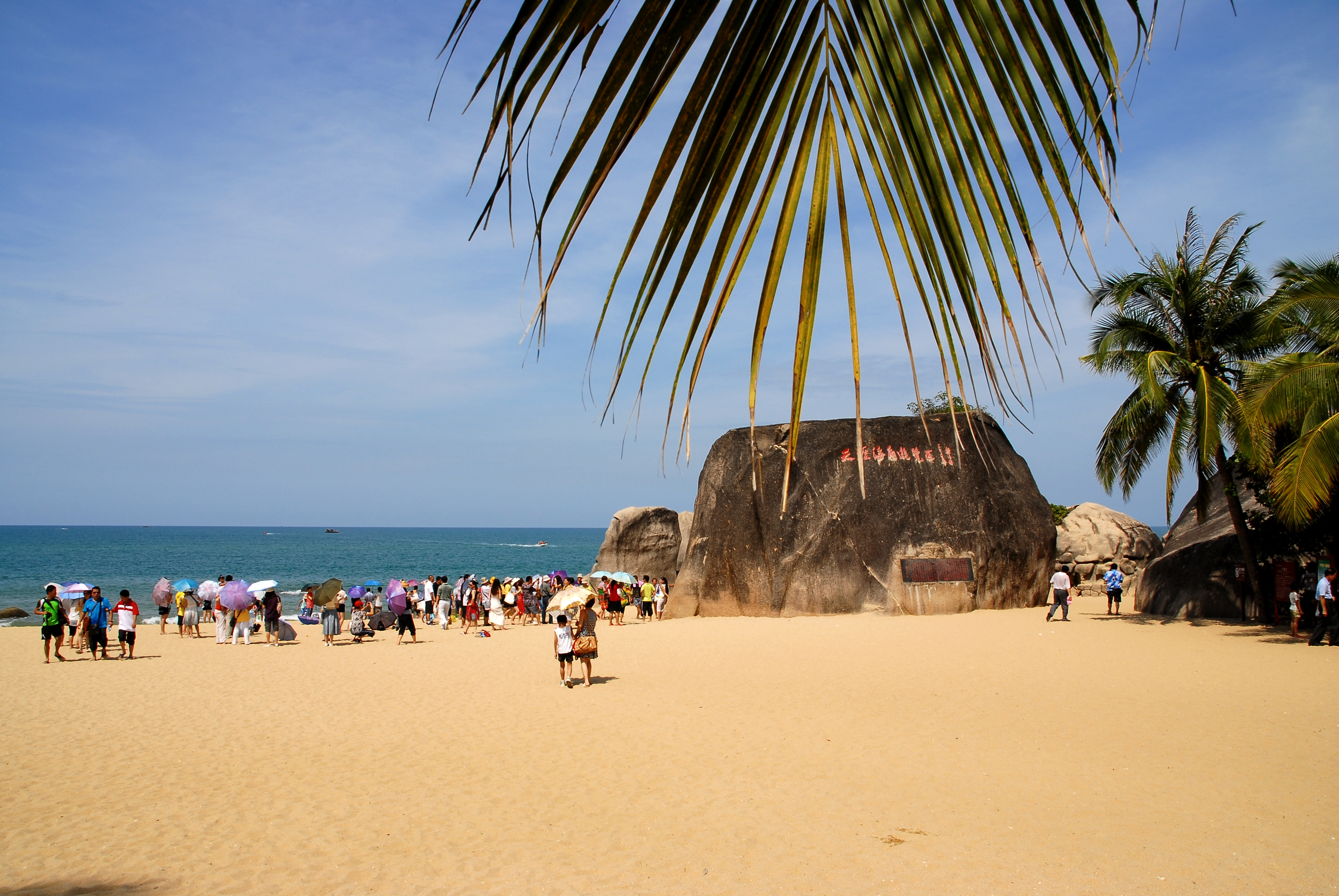

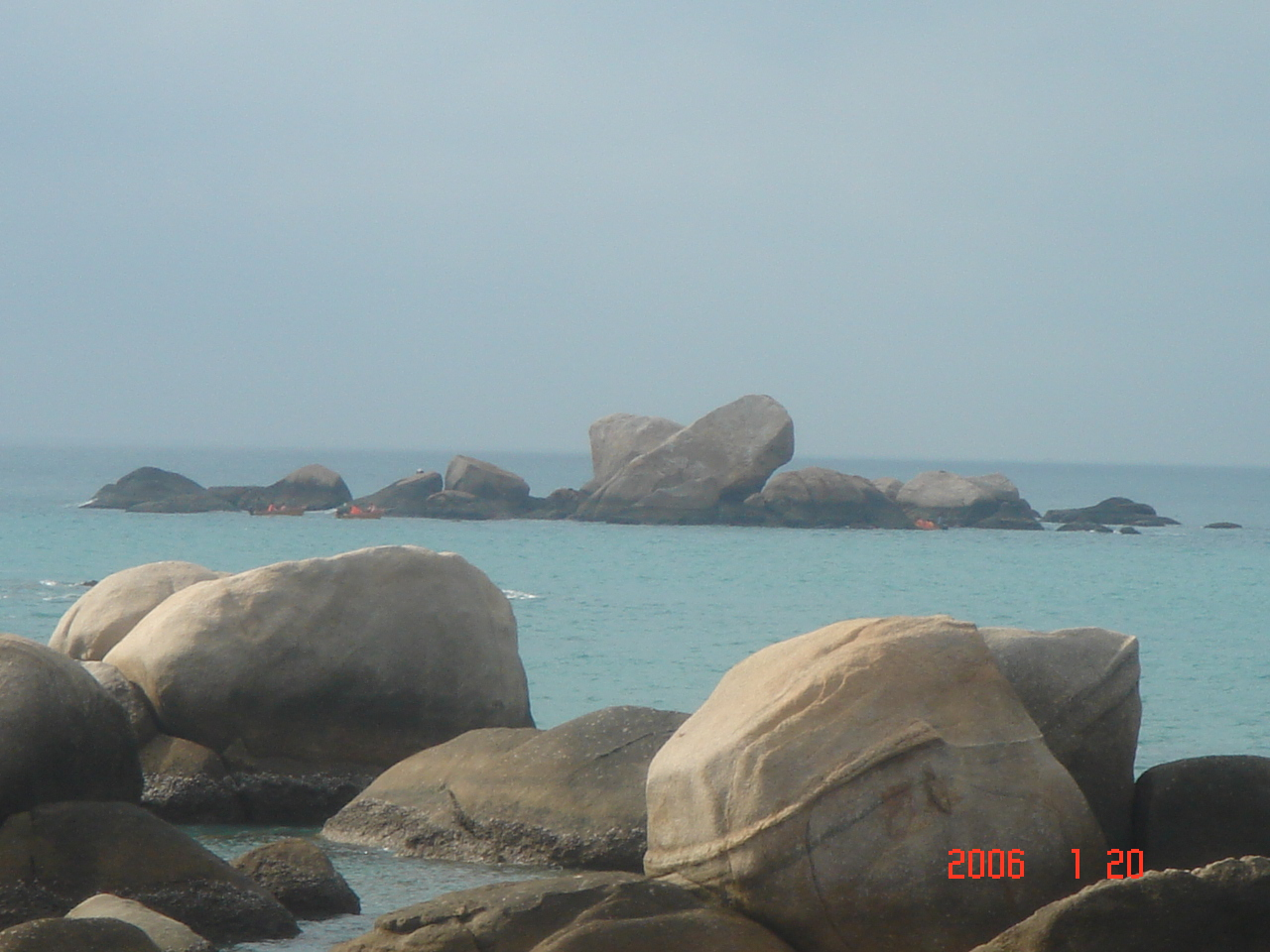
The Rock of Sun and Moon

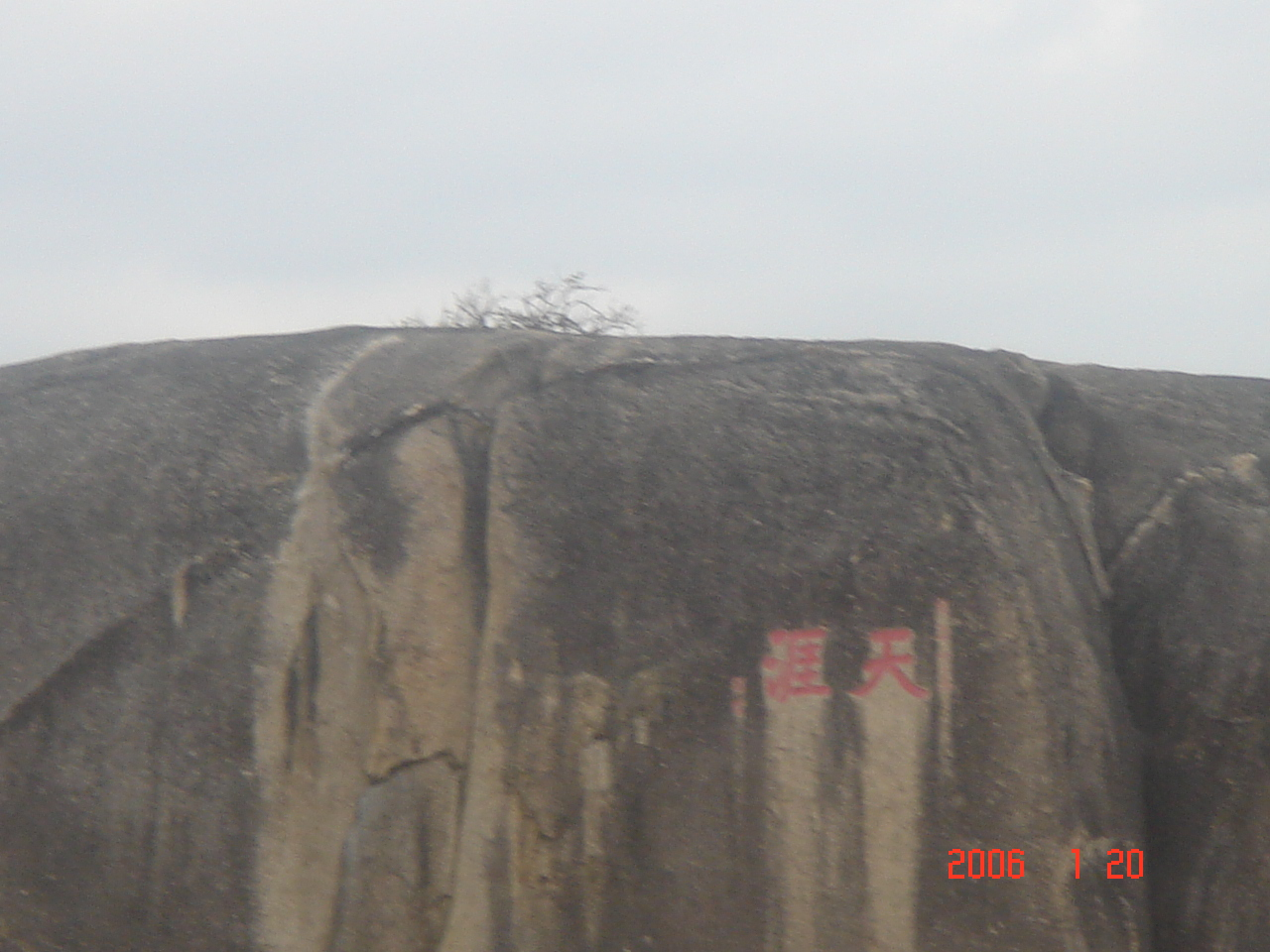
The Tianya (天涯) Cliff

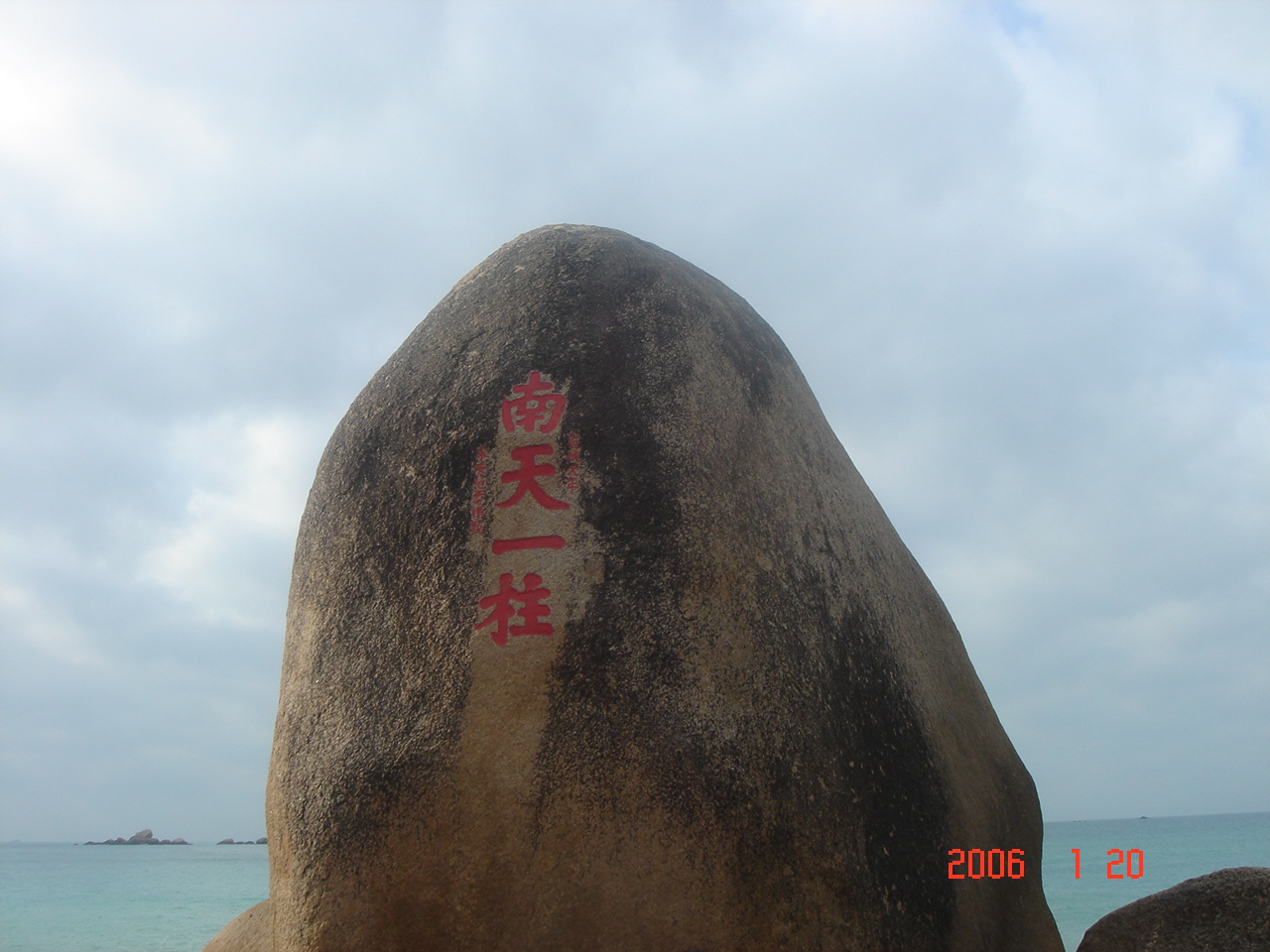
Southern Heaven Rock

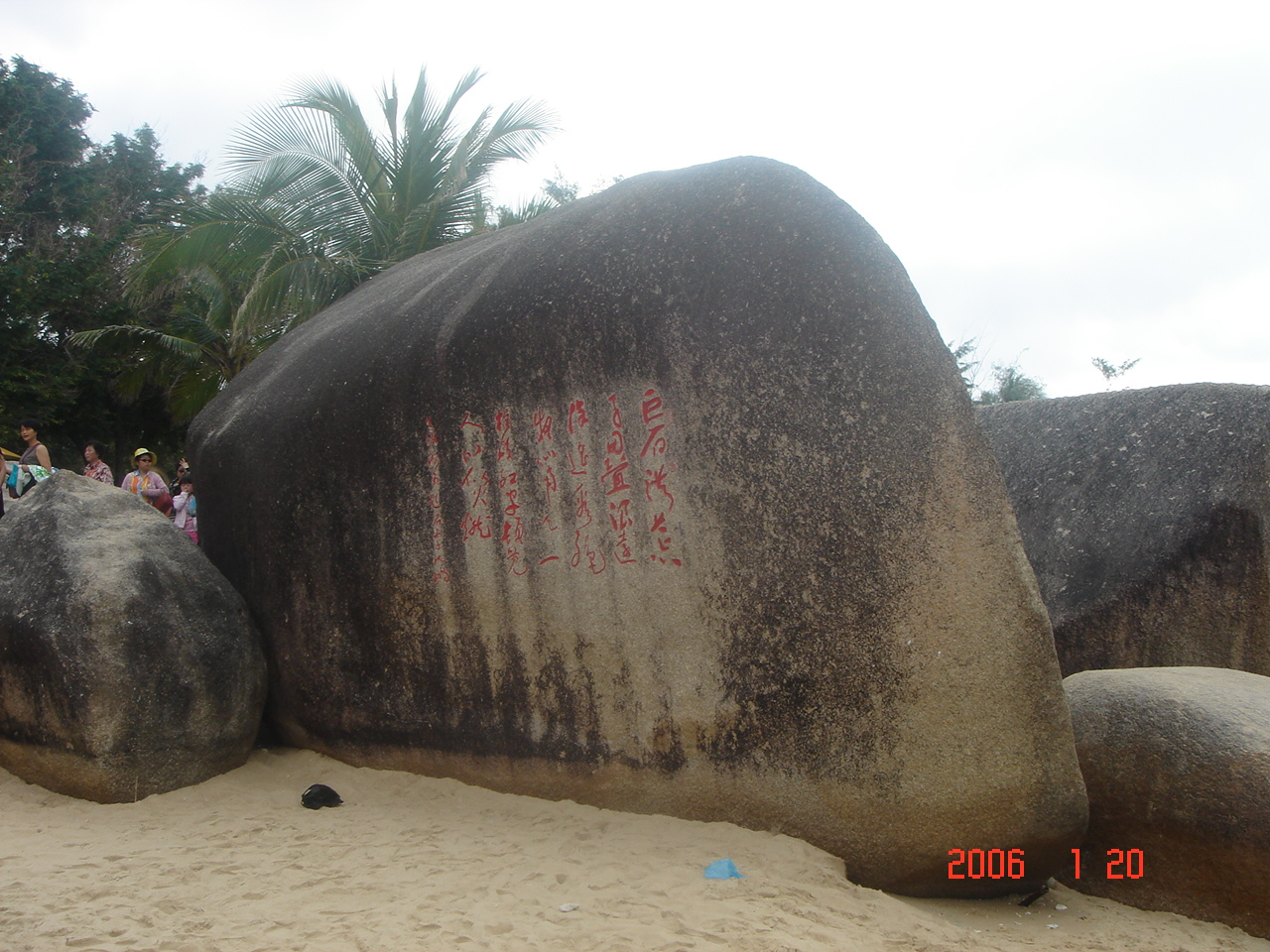
Another rock with a famous Chinese poem inscribed on it

Tianya Haijiao (Chinese: 天涯海角; pinyin: Tiānyá Hǎijiǎo; lit. 'Edges of the heaven', 'corners of the sea') is a popular visitor attraction 24 kilometres (15 mi) west of Sanya city, Hainan, China.

The venue is considered the southernmost point of China's land area despite the fact that Jinmu Cape actually is. It is for this reason that it is a popular sightseeing destination for tourists, as well as the fact that, on clear days, various islets are visible.

In Chinese literature, the cape is mentioned in many famous poems, such as "I will follow you to Tian-Ya-Hai-Jiao", which means the couple will never be separated. Therefore, many newlyweds spend part of their honeymoon visiting the place.

The term is also used to refer to other similar locations such as Cabo da Roca.

== Popular tourist attractions ==
- The Rocks of Sun and Moon (日月石) are two boulders near hundreds of other uniquely shaped rocks. Here the "Sun" refers to "husband" and the "Moon" refers to "wife". Looking from the distance, they resemble a couple entwined to each other but they are in fact separate rocks.
- Southern Heaven Rock (南天一柱), a boulder near the Rock of Sun and Moon, with a famous poem of Fan Yun-Ti (范雲梯) inscribed on its top.
- Tian-Ya Cliff (天涯), with an inscription by Cheng Zhe on the top.
- Pre-Historic Shell Museum
