= Trams in Sintra =

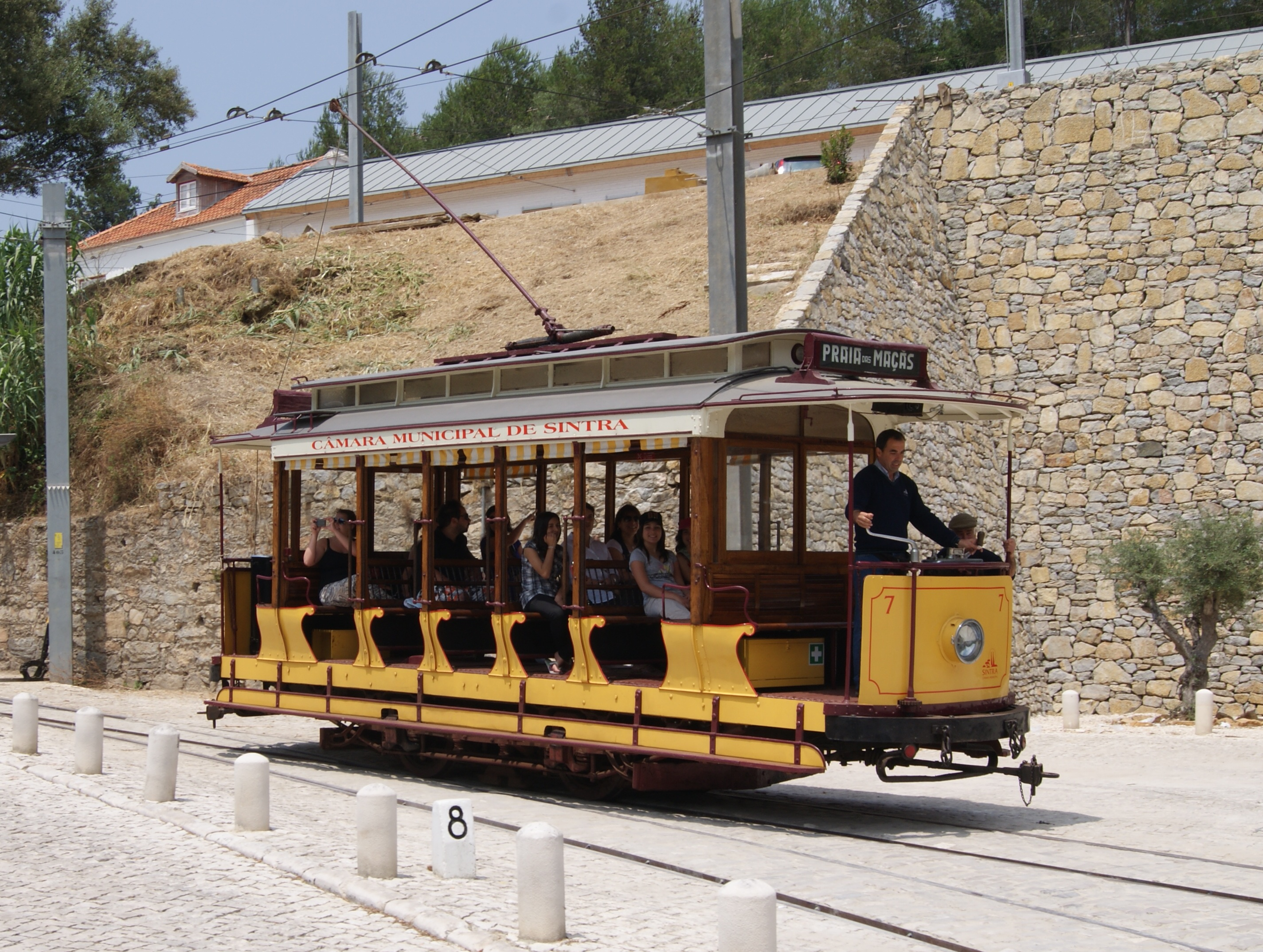
- Sintra open tram 7 leaving Nunes de Carvalho, bound for Praia das Maçãs

Technical
- Line length: ~11.5 km (7.1 mi)
- Number of tracks: Single track
- Track gauge: 1,000 mm (3 ft 3 3/8 in) metre gauge

The Sintra tramway is a seasonal narrow gauge tourist tram line in Portugal. It links the town of Sintra with Praia das Maçãs, passing through Colares and close to the Praia Grande (Sintra). It has a length of some 11.5 kilometres (7.1 mi).

== History ==
The line opened in 1904 over the 11.7 kilometres (7.3 mi) between Sintra railway station and Praia das Maçãs. A connecting 1 kilometre (0.62 mi) long urban tram route linked the Sintra station with Sintra Vila. Besides passenger traffic, freight was carried, principally between Banzão and Sintra station.

In 1930, the line was extended by 1.9 kilometres (1.2 mi) from Praia das Maças to Azenhas do Mar, but this extension survived only until 1954. The following year, the urban line was closed, leaving just the original line between Sintra station and Praia das Maçãs. Winter service had ended in 1953, and the line continued to run as a summer only service until 1974.

Following the Carnation Revolution of 1974, there was no service on the tramway until 1980. A summer service then resumed, albeit an irregular service over the short section between Praia das Maçãs and Banzão.

Following denationalisation of Portugal's provincial bus services in the 1990s, ownership of the line was taken over by Stagecoach Portugal, but the tram services—which operated only during the tourist season—was later handed over to the Municipality of Sintra, which re-extended the line over its long-abandoned formation from Ribeira to central Sintra.

Damage to the infrastructure occurred in late 2011 when a tree fell on the line and a 1 km (0.62 mi) stretch of overhead copper cables was stolen, costing the council €150,000. The tramway was reopened for the 2012 season.
