= Almoçageme =

Coordinates: 38°48′N 9°28′W

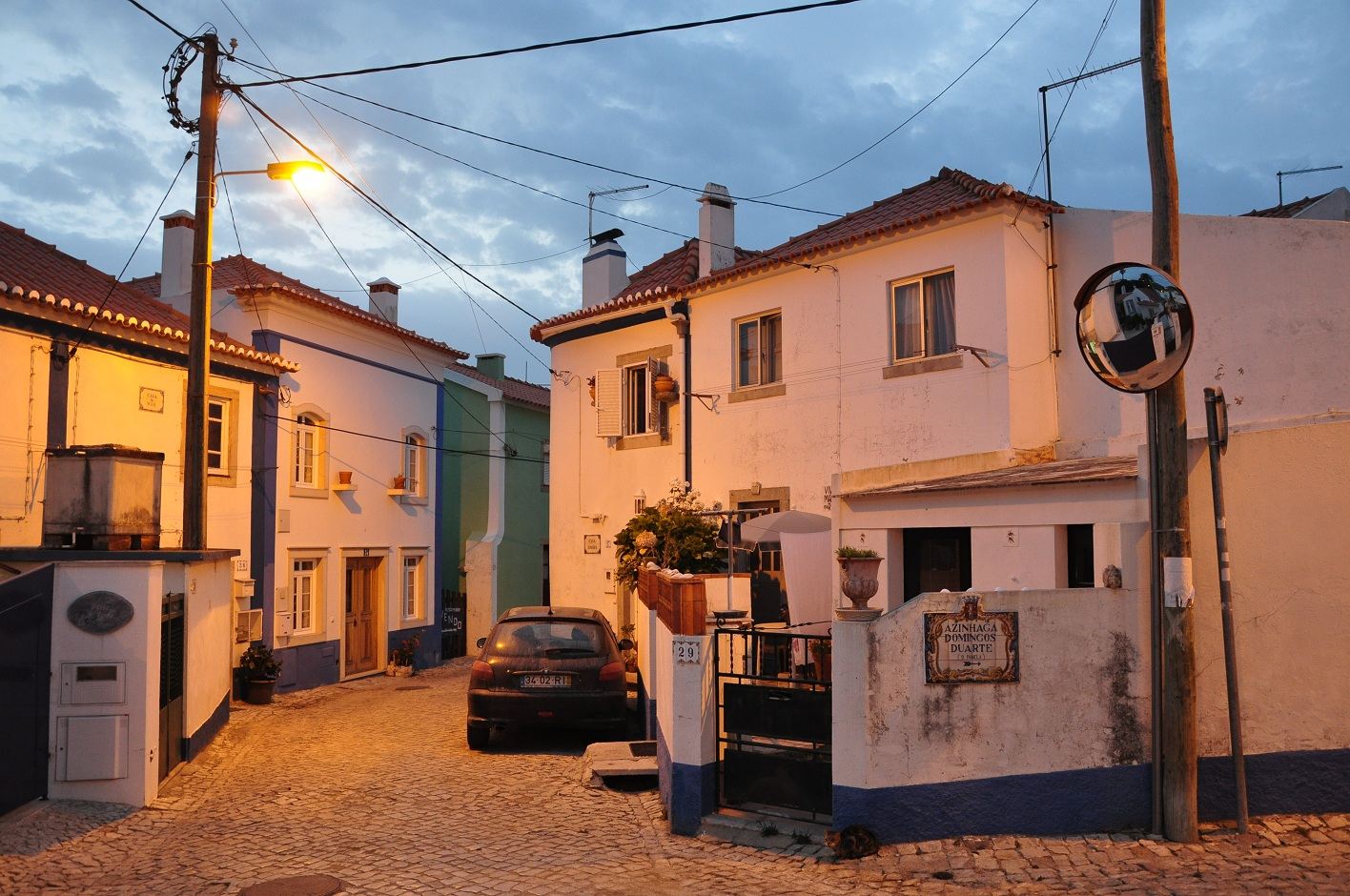
Rua dos Combatantes do Ultramar

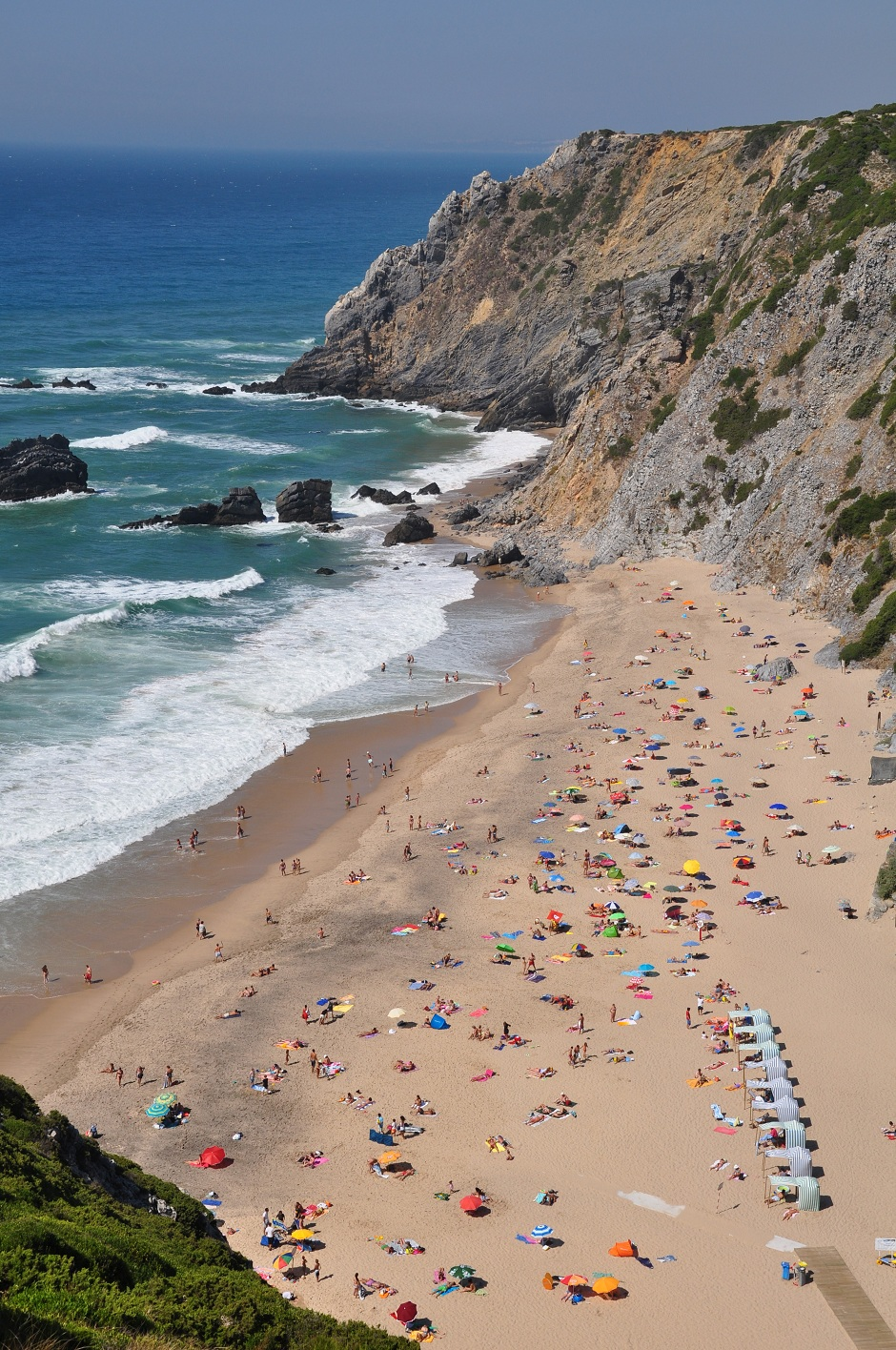
Praia da Adraga

Almoçageme (pronounced: Al-mu-sa-jè-mê) is a village on the Portuguese municipality of Sintra and in the Freguesia of Colares.

The name Almoçageme is obviously Arab in origin – the Iberian peninsula is packed with Muslim toponyms that are a legacy of the five hundred years the Moors stayed over. One possible root is from al-masjid or al-mesijide, meaning “the mosque” – although there are no testimonies of one having been around.

Local festivities honoring Nossa Senhora da Graça take place on the first Sunday of October and last eight days.

There are Roman ruins of a “villa” in this most occidental spot of the Roman Empire, dating from the 2nd century CE. These were unearthed in 1905 during the construction of a road (Estrada do Rodizio) linking Almoçageme with the spectacular beach of Praia Grande. Excavations are under way in the Roman villa of Santo André de Almoçageme and the findings are sent to the Archaeological Museum of São Miguel de Odrinhas – a 40-minute drive away.

Almoçageme boasts the beach of Adraga with a vintage fish restaurant right by the sand that is the delight of the visitor.
