= Jinmu =

Jinmu may refer to:

- Emperor Jimmu, legendary first Emperor of Japan
- Queen Mother of the West, Chinese deity, also known as Jinmu (Golden Mother)
- Jinmu Cape, southernmost tip of Hainan Island, China
