= Praia da Adraga =

Beach in Portugal

Coordinates: 38°48′16″N 9°29′06″W

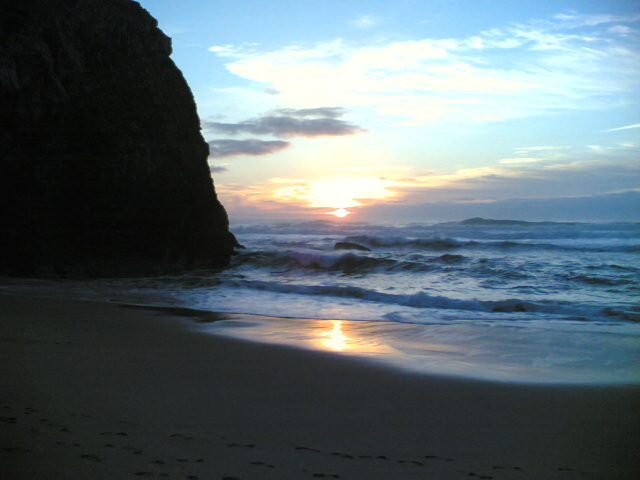
Sunset at "Praia da Adraga"

Praia da Adraga is a North Atlantic beach in Portugal, near to the town of Almoçageme, Sintra. It has been recommended in British newspapers. It is a "Blue Flag beach" with access for handicapped persons, It has an excellent restaurant and a very good emergency service system, although it is hard to reach by public transportation.

Because of its beauty it has been the subject of many photographs and many blogs.
