= Cabo da Roca Lighthouse =

Lighthouse in Sintra, Portugal

Cabo da Roca Lighthouse Farol do Cabo da Roca
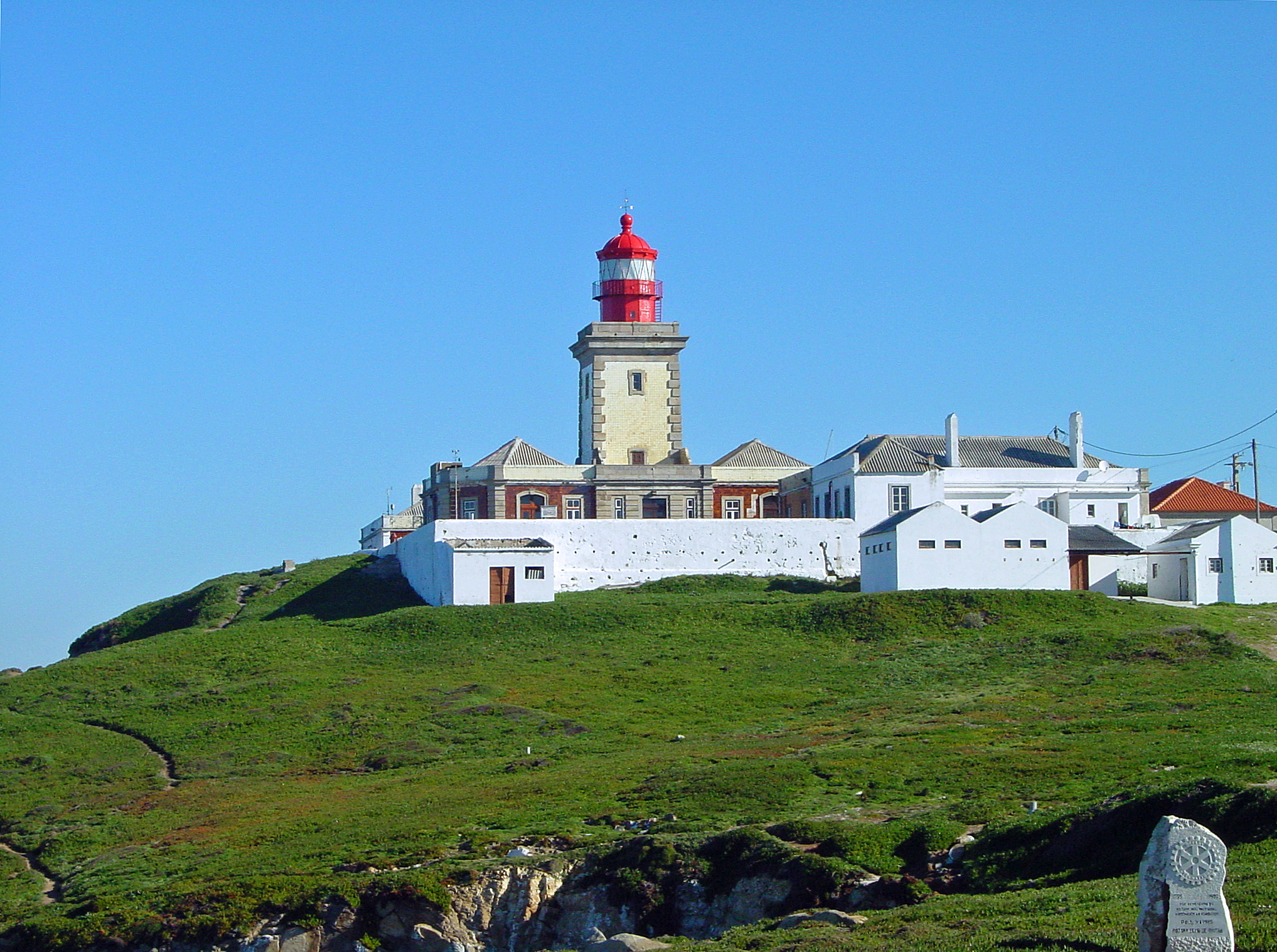
- The lighthouse complex on the edge of the Cape
- Location: Colares; Sintra; Portugal
- Coordinates: 38°46′55.2″N 9°29′50.4″W

Tower
- Constructed: 1772
- Construction: stone tower
- Automated: 1990
- Height: 22 metres (72 ft)
- Shape: square tower with balcony and lantern rising from a 1-storey keeper's house
- Markings: white tower and unpainted stone trim, red lantern
- Operator: Directorate for Lighthouses (Direcção de Faróis)
- Heritage: Included in the Protected Area of Sintra-Cascais (PT031111050264)
- Fog signal: inactive
- Racon: deactivated

Light
- First lit: 1772
- Focal height: 165 metres (541 ft)
- Lens: 16 Argand lamps with parabolic reflectors (original), crystal optic with a third-order Fresnel rotational beacon (current)
- Intensity: 3000 W
- Range: 26 nmi (48 km; 30 mi)
- Characteristic: Fl(4) W 18s
- Portugal no.: PT-186

The Cabo da Roca Lighthouse (Portuguese: Farol do Cabo da Roca) is a beacon/lighthouse located 165 metres (541 ft) above the Atlantic Ocean, on Portugal's (and continental Europe's) most westerly extent. It is located in the civil parish of Colares, in the municipality of Sintra, situated on a promontory made up of granite boulders and interspersed limestone. It is a third-order lighthouse, which originally began operating in 1772. It was the first new purpose-built lighthouse to be constructed in the country; the older lighthouses in existence at that time were constructed on existing platforms or from pre-existing beacons.

== History ==
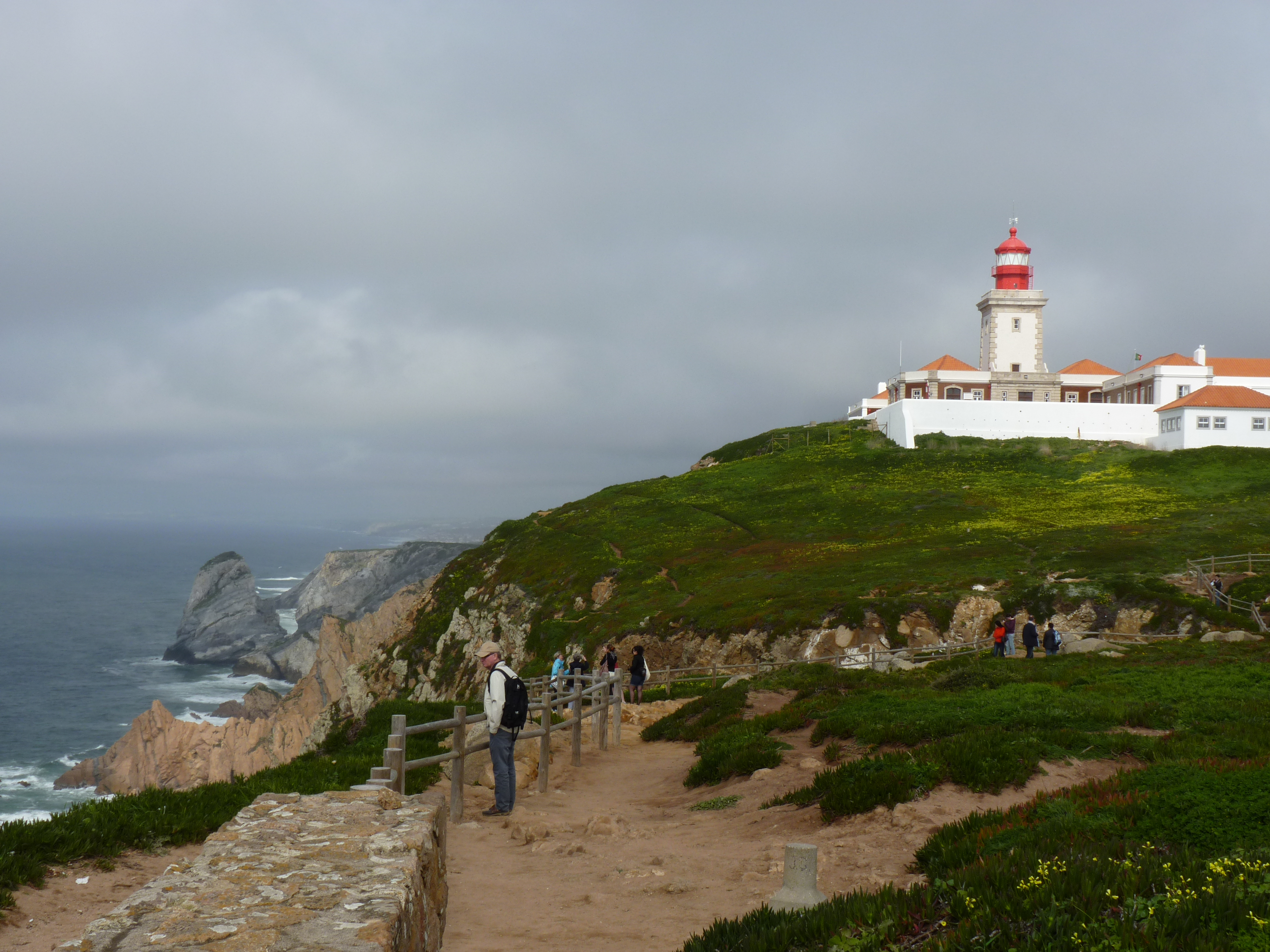
Cabo da Roca, a tourist attraction and limit of continental Europe, with the lighthouse in the background

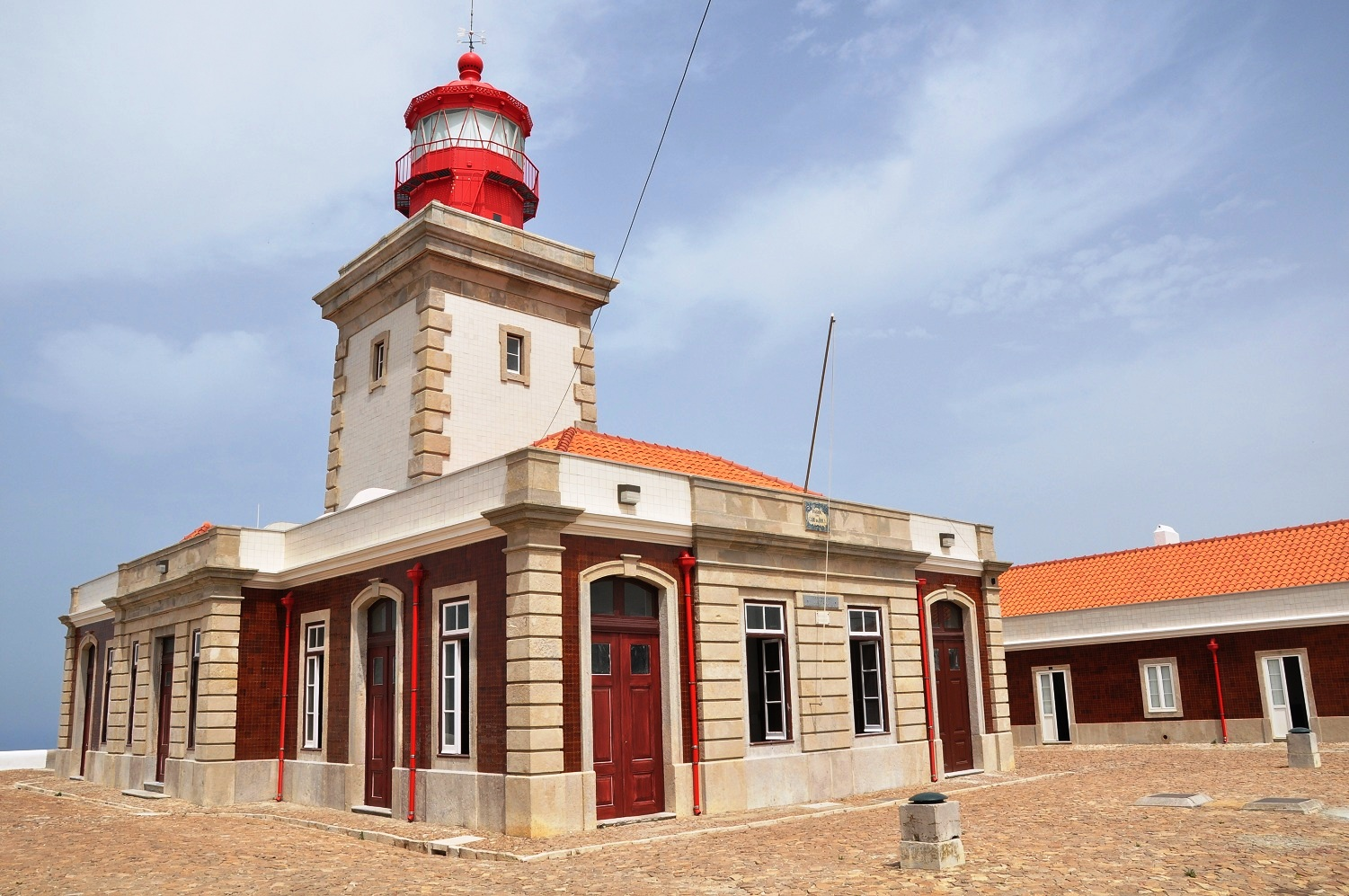
Close-up of the base and main tower of the Cabo da Roca complex

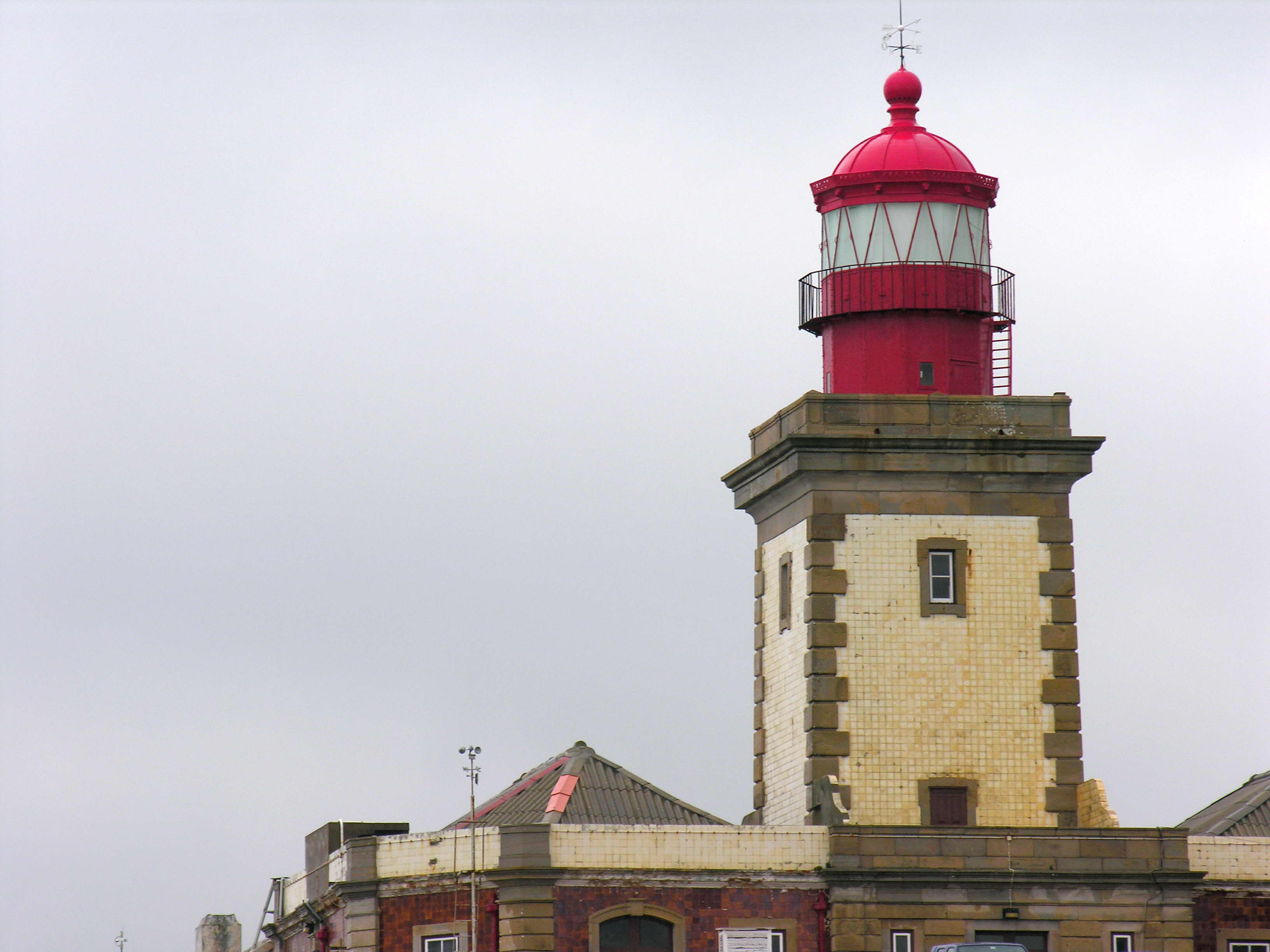
Main beacon on the lighthouse

The initiative to construct the lighthouse came from the Junta Geral da Fazenda do Reino on 1 February 1758, in an order to construct six lighthouses strategically along the coast to assist navigation.

Cabo da Roca lighthouse began operating in 1772, becoming the third oldest lighthouse along the Portuguese coast.

During the management of civil engineer Gaudêncio Fontana (1843), the lighthouse was updated with a new rotation platform, comprising sixteen Argand lamps with parabolic reflectors. However, by 1865, there were critics of the system, noting the inefficiency of the lighthouse. Over time this was addressed by the installation of a blow-horn signal and the installation of electric-powered machinery. The "electrical" lighthouse began functioning in 1897, with a system that included a backup petroleum lamp. The main unit was a fourth-order optical system, with rotational platform and clock mechanism, and was paired with a steam siren.

In 1917 a building was constructed to produce the acetylene gas necessary to power a new lamp system.

The siren was replaced in 1932 by a compressed air blow-horn, while a lighthouse radio system was installed in 1937. During the post-World War era a new fourth-order optical system replaced the older mechanism, but was quickly substituted by a third-order lamp with a 3000 Watt lamp. At the end of the 1940s, the site was provided with by public water and drainage.

During the mid-1950s, the Direcção Geral dos Edifícios e Monumentos Nacionais (DGEMN) (General Directorate for Buildings and National Monuments), and its Serviços de Construcção e Conservação (Construction and Conservation Service) branch, was responsible for periodical conservation and maintenance of the lighthouse; in 1956 a renovation was undertaken.

It was only in 1980 that the electrical grid reached the site, resulting in the 1982 installation of an electrical siren. By 1990, the lighthouse was automated and the acetylene production facility was closed.

In 2000, the electrical siren ceased to function, and the following year, the radio system was deactivated.

== Architecture ==
The lighthouse stands 22 metres at its base; its light commands a 165-metre beam from sea level. In addition to the main tower, the complex is composed of nine buildings, since prior to electrification, it was necessary to house a team to maintain the lamp, store valuable equipment and produce the acetylene necessary to run the torch. Currently, the lighthouse supports a team of three lighthouse keepers, in order to monitor the lamp and signal, and communicate between Cabo da Roca and Ericeira.

It is accessible by the Estrada do Cabo da Roca, and situated very close to the westernmost extent of continental Europe. Although not on that point, it does occupy the safest position on the Cape to monitor and safeguard the navigable seas, with a coastal panorama.

== See also ==
- List of lighthouses in Portugal
- Directorate of Lighthouses, Portugal
