= Colares (Sintra) =

- Civil parish
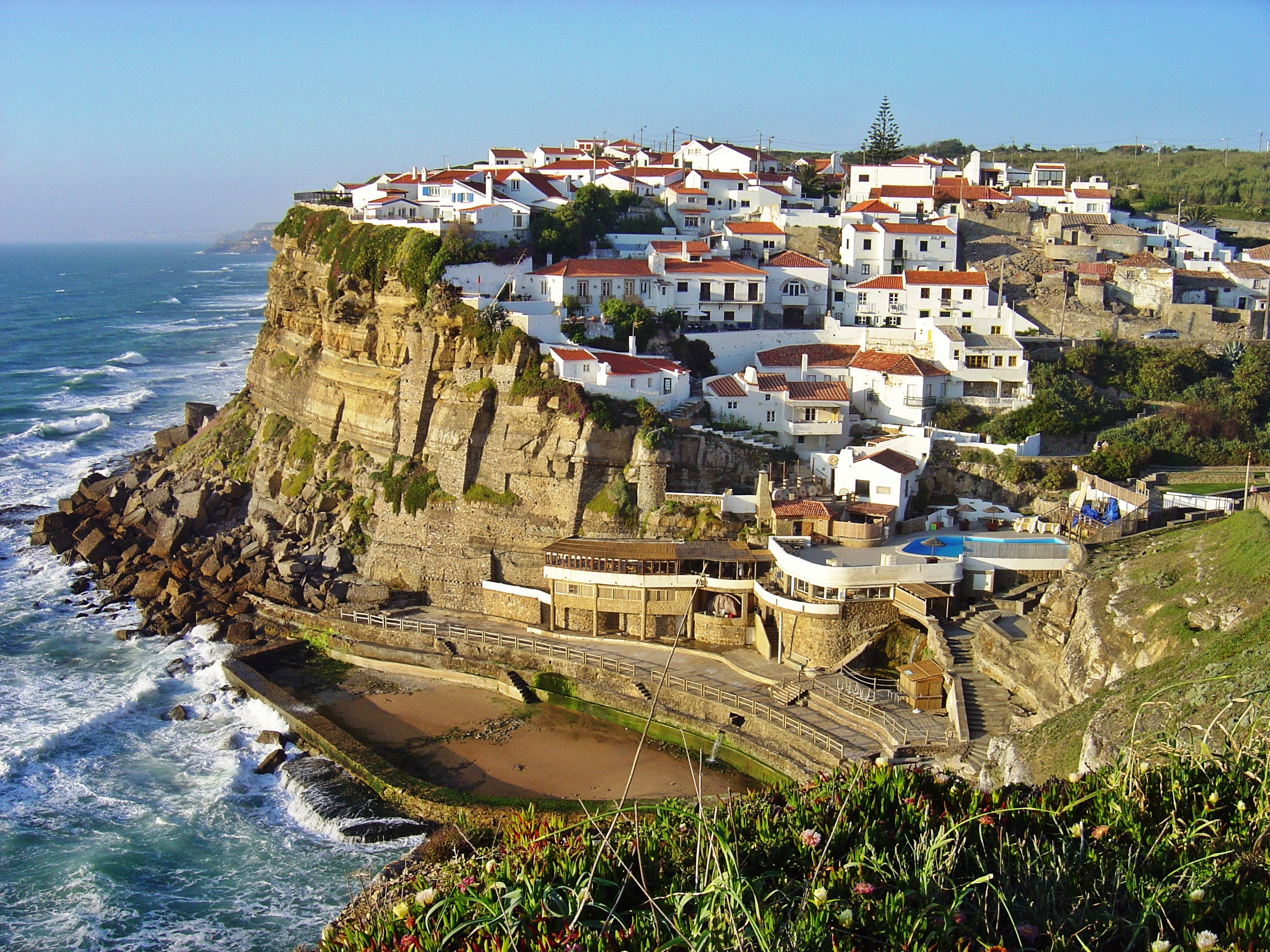
- Village of Azenhas do Mar on the Colares coast.

- Location in Portugal
- Coordinates: 38.803°N 9.450°W
- Country: Portugal
- Region: Lisbon
- Metropolitan area: Lisbon
- District: Lisbon
- Municipality: Sintra

Area
  - Total: 33.37 km^{2} (12.88 sq mi)

Population (2011)
  - Total: 7,628
  - Density: 228.6/km^{2} (592.0/sq mi)
- Time zone: UTC+00:00 (WET)
  - Summer (DST): UTC+01:00 (WEST)
- Postal code: 2705
- Area code: 219
- Patron: Nossa Senhora da Assunção
- Website: https://www.jf-colares.pt

Colares (Portuguese pronunciation: [kuˈlaɾɨʃ]) is a civil parish along the coast of the municipality of Sintra. The population in 2011 was 7,628, in an area of 33.37 square kilometres (12.88 sq mi).

== History ==
Cabo da Roca, the westernmost point of mainland Europe.

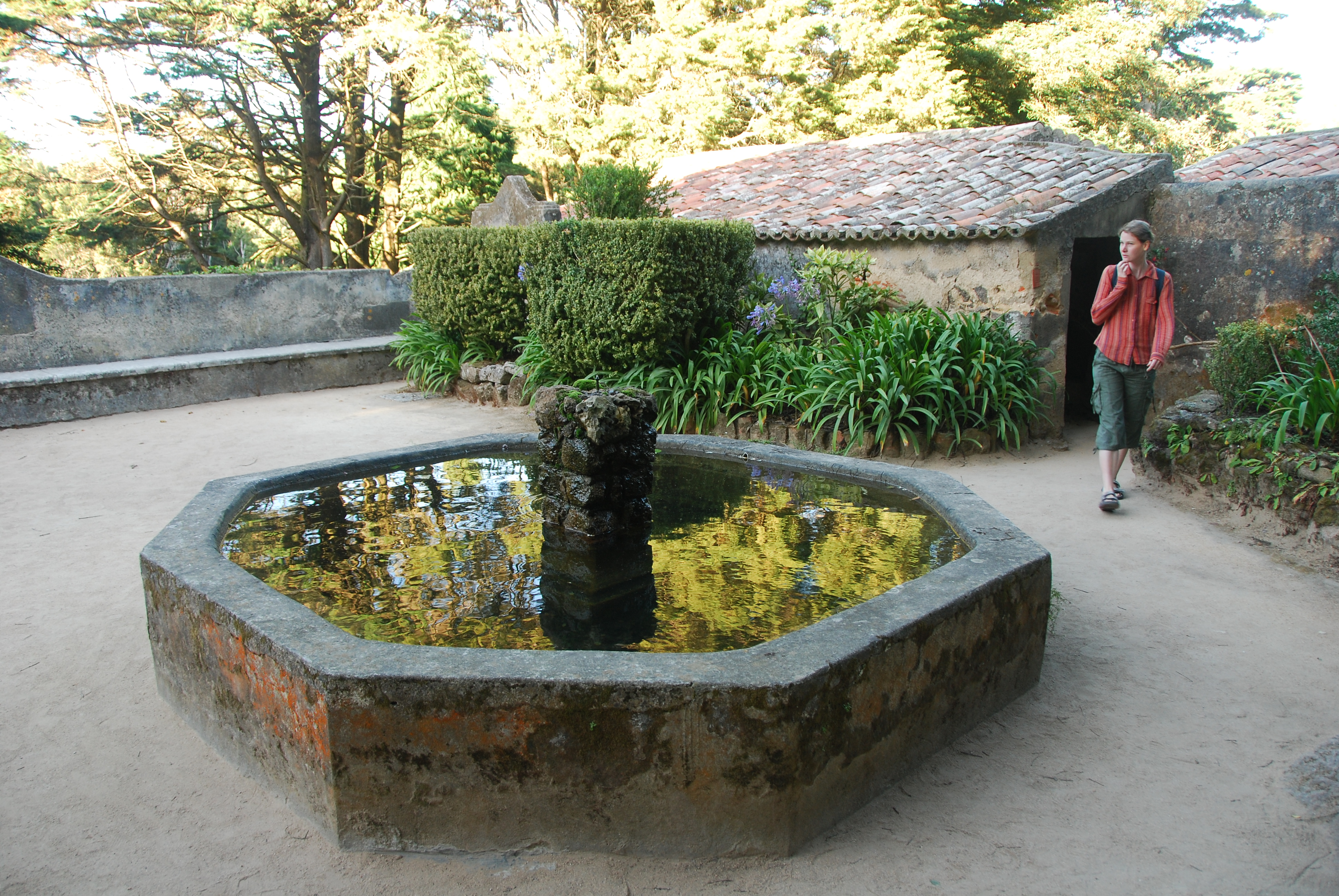
The Convent of the Capuchos.

Even before there was a "Portugal", the region of Colares was a place of human movement and settlement. By the Roman occupation of the Iberian Peninsula, the architecture of Colares was carved by Latin inscriptions, such as one found near the mouth of the Maçãs River: SOLI ET LUNAE CESTIVIUS ACIDIVIS PERENNIS LEG. AVG. PR. PR. PROVINCIAE LUSITANAE.

It was conquered and held by Sigurd I of Norway for a few months in 1108, during the Norwegian Crusade.

After a period of Moorish occupation, armies loyal to Afonso Henriques conquered the region, as a sequence of their victory in Sintra, around 1147. The region remained in the hands of the Crown until 1385, when it was donated by John I to the constable Nuno Álvares Pereira to compensate the mercenary for his support against Castile.

These lands returned to the crown following the death of Infanta Beatrice, mother of Manuel I.

The historical village of Colares, which was important in the nation's pre-history, obtained a foral early after its creation. The parish of Nossa Senhora da Assunção was a bishopric rectory in the old comarca of Torres Vedras, and Colares was the seat of its own municipality, attributed to King Afonso III, in May 1255. A new foral was issued on 10 November 1516 by Manuel I.

In 1801, the municipality of Colares included 1930 inhabitants, and by 1849, it already had 3341 inhabitants.

During the administrative reforms of 24 October 1855, the municipality of Colares was extinguished and the territory integrated into the municipality of Sintra, as a civil parish.

Grapevines are grown directly upon the sand in the Colares DOC, which covers 50 acres of remaining vineyards. In the 1940s, vineyards covered 2,500 acres. Between 1934 and 1994, only the local co-op could use the Colares appellation.

Red wines, which make up 75% of platings, are grown from ramisco grape and are aged over ten years before being marketed. White wines, grown from a local variant of malvasia, are not aged as long. Because phylloxera aphids cannot live on sand, Colares vineyards are some of the only European vines that are not grafted upon American rootstocks.

== Geography ==
The civil parish is located on the western coast of Portugal, and marked by Europe's extreme western extent: Cabo da Roca. Its contains the settlements Almoçageme, Atalaia, Azenhas do Mar, Azóia, Colares, Eugaria, Gigarós, Mucifal, Penedo, Praia das Maçãs and Ulgueira.

=== Climate ===
Climate data for Colares, 1970-1991 normals, altitude: 25 m (82 ft)
Month	Jan	Feb	Mar	Apr	May	Jun	Jul	Aug	Sep	Oct	Nov	Dec	Year
Mean daily maximum °C (°F)	15.1 (59.2)	15.1 (59.2)	16.3 (61.3)	17.3 (63.1)	19.1 (66.4)	19.2 (66.6)	23.3 (73.9)	23.9 (75.0)	24.2 (75.6)	21.4 (70.5)	18.1 (64.6)	15.7 (60.3)	19.1 (66.3)
Daily mean °C (°F)	11.1 (52.0)	11.6 (52.9)	12.4 (54.3)	13.4 (56.1)	15.2 (59.4)	17.5 (63.5)	19.1 (66.4)	19.5 (67.1)	19.4 (66.9)	16.9 (62.4)	14.2 (57.6)	11.9 (53.4)	15.2 (59.3)
Mean daily minimum °C (°F)	7.2 (45.0)	8.0 (46.4)	8.5 (47.3)	9.6 (49.3)	11.2 (52.2)	13.6 (56.5)	14.9 (58.8)	15.1 (59.2)	14.7 (58.5)	12.4 (54.3)	10.2 (50.4)	8.2 (46.8)	11.1 (52.1)
Average precipitation mm (inches)	94 (3.7)	94 (3.7)	57 (2.2)	66 (2.6)	47 (1.9)	20 (0.8)	6 (0.2)	8 (0.3)	28 (1.1)	77 (3.0)	109 (4.3)	118 (4.6)	724 (28.4)
Source: IPMA

== Architecture ==
=== Prehistoric ===
- Dolmen of Adrenunes (Portuguese: Anta de Adrenunes)
- Praia das Maçãs Prehistoric Monument

=== Archaeological ===
- Archaeological Site of Alto da Vigia (Portuguese: Sítio Arqueológico do Alto da Vigia)
- Roman villa of Santo André de Almoçageme (Portuguese: Vila Romana de Santo André de Almoçageme)
- Tholos tomb of Bela Vista (Portuguese: Tholos da Bela Vista)
- Tholos tomb of Monge (Portuguese: Tholos do Monge)

=== Civic ===
- Building of Correios, Telégrafos e Telefones (CTT) de Colares
- Vila Vitorino
- Cinema/Theatre Gomes da Silva (Portuguese: Cine-Teatre Gomes da Silva)
- Cellar of the Viscount Salreu (Portuguese: Adega do Visconde Salreu)
- Estate of Quinta do Casas Novas
- Estate of Quinta da Fonte
- Estate of Quinta da Fonte Velha
- Estate of Quinta de Vale Marinha
- Estate of Quinta do Pé da Serra
- Estate of Quinta do Rio Milho
- Estate of Quinta dos Freixes
- Estate of Quinta Mazziotti/Quinta do França
- Estate of Quinta Milides
- Estate of Nossa Senhora de Melides
- Fountain of Espoujeiro (Portuguese: Chafariz do Espoujeiro)
- Lighthouse of Cabo da Roca (Portuguese: Farol do Cabo da Roca)
- Pillory of Colares (Portuguese: Pelourinho de Colares)
- Primary School of Azenhas do Mar (Portuguese: Escola Primária das Azenhas do Mar)
- Residence of Quinta da Bela Vista (Portuguese: Casa da Quinta da Bela Vista)
- Residence of Quinta do Cosme (Portuguese: Casa dos Lafetás/Quinta do Cosme)
- Residence of Quinta do Vinagre (Portuguese: Casa da Quinta do Vinagre)
- Residence (Pombaline) on Largo do Pelourinho (Portuguese: Casa Pombalino no Largo do Pelourinho)
- Residence (17th century) on Largo do Pelourinho (Portuguese: Casa Setecentista no Largo do Pelourinho)
- Residence on Avenida do Atlântico, 180 (Portuguese: Moradia na Avenida do Atlântico, 180)
- Residence on Rua da Abreja (Portuguese: Casa na Rua da Abreja)
- Residence on Rua da República (Portuguese: Casa na Rua da República)
- Residence Saloia (Portuguese: Casa Saloia no Penedo)
- Summer cottage of Praia das Maçãs (Portuguese: Colónia de Férias de Praia das Maçãs)
- Villa Guida
- (Old) Casino of Praia das Maçãs (Portuguese: Antigo Casino de Praia das Maçãs)

=== Military ===
- Castle of Colares (Portuguese: Castelo Velho de Colares)

=== Religious ===
- Chapel of the Misericórdia of Colares (Portuguese: Capela da Misericórdia de Colares)
- Chapel of Nossa Senhora das Mercês (Portuguese: Capela da Nossa Senhora das Mercês)
- Chapel of Nossa Senhora da Praia (Portuguese: Capela da Nossa Senhora da Praia)
- Chapel of São Lourenço (Portuguese: Capela de São Lourenço)
- Church of Almoçageme (Portuguese: Igreja Parochial de Almoçageme)
- Church of Nossa Senhora da Assunção (Portuguese: Igreja Matriz de Nossa Senhora da Assunção)
- Convent of Santa Ana (Portuguese: Convento de Santa Ana da Ordem do Carmo)
- Convent of Santa Cruz (Portuguese: Convento de Santa Cruz do Capuchos)
- Convent of São Saturino (Portuguese: Convento de São Saturino)
- Hermitage of Nossa Senhora da Conceição de Ulgueira (Portuguese: Ermida de Nossa Senhora da Conceição da Ulgeira)
- Sanctuary of Nossa Senhora da Peninha (Portuguese: Santuário da Peninha / Capela de Nossa Senhora da Penha e dependências)

== See also ==
- Colares DOC
