= Archaeological Site of Alto da Vigia =

Portuguese archaeological site

- Estação Arqueológica de Alto da Vigia (Portuguese)
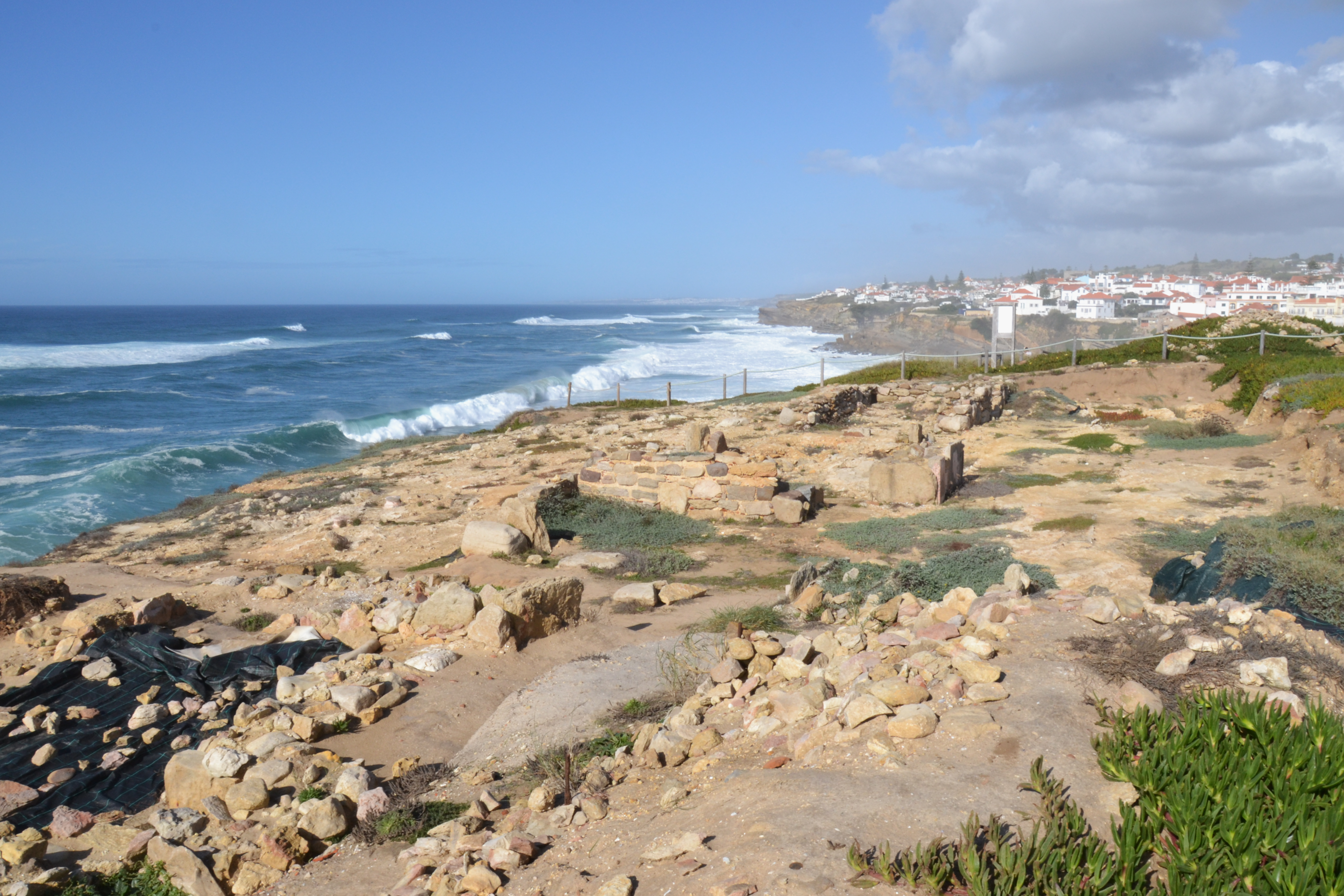

- Location of the site in Portugal
- Interactive map of Archaeological Site of Alto da Vigia
- 38°49′25″N 9°28′18″W
- Type: Necropolis
- Cultures: Roman Empire (Lusitania), Al-Andalus
- Location: Colares, Sintra, Lisboa District, Portugal

Site notes
- Elevation: 20 m (66 ft)
- Length: 19.25 m (63.2 ft)
- Width: 22.5 m (74 ft)
- Excavation dates: Since 2008
- Archaeologists: unknown
- Owner: Portuguese Republic
- Public access: Private
- Website: Official website

The Archaeological Site of Alto da Vigia (Portuguese: Estação Arqueológica de Alto da Vigia, [ˈaltu ðɐ viˈʒi.ɐ], "Lookout Height") is an archaeological site associated with Roman interventions in the Portugal, situated along the Praia das Maçãs in the civil parish of Colares, in municipality of Sintra.

== History ==
The existence of a Roman sanctuary dates to the 2nd or 3rd century AD, when the lands overlooking the coast were dedicated to Sun, Moon and Imperial cult. At that time a circular temenos, an open air religious space, was used by holders of high imperial positions in the territory.

Little is known about the intervening years, although a Moorish settlement occupied the lands sometime in the 12th century. The group eventually disappeared, and the area was abandoned. Much of the stonework was used by locals to build their own residences or used in public construction.

The re-discovery of these ruins date back to Valentim Fernandes in 1505; and Francisco de Holanda, around 1541, with the latter including designs and observations of the structures, which he observed were a Roman sanctuary. The identification of these ruins, corresponded to the first archeological discovery in Portugal. Its importance was largely recognized by the number of local, national and international visitors during the Renaissance. Among the illustrious visitors were members of the Portuguese royal family, namely King D. Manuel, and later, the Infante D. Luís, brother of King D. John III.

These descriptions suggest that the site was visitable during the 16th century, at a time when the structures were largely submerged in the sand. Yet, local memory helped the stories to continue, and the existence of a Roman sanctuary along the Sintra coast remained in the minds of locals, even as its specific location could not be identified. Various studies and scientific work finally identified its presence on a small hilltop escarpment overlooking the Praia das Maçãs, known locally as the Alto da Vigia and Alconchel. A team from the Archaeological Museum of São Miguel de Odrinhas began excavations in 2008, alongside a tower structure, unearthing a monumental Roman sanctuary.

In 2021 the site was classified by the Ministry of Culture as a "Place of Public Interest".

== Architecture ==
The site is situated above cliffs overlooking the beach of Praia das Maçãs, on barren lands. The complex includes a Roman sanctuary and a tower dating from the 16th century. In addition, there were also identified vestiges from the Islamic epoch, totally unknown until their discovery, although the toponym Alconchel (al-concilium) may have alluded to its presence. Architectural artefacts from the Moorish period correspond to a ribat (or convent) that included various halls, with a mihrab oriented towards the southeast (in the direction of Mecca). The remaining materials associated with the Moors are residual, and include ceramics from the 12th century (likely associated the final phase of occupation), as well as shells and fires (suggesting a link between the coastal activities and food for these locals. In addition to the buildings, an area of graves were identified without any artefacts linked to the Islamic presence. The structures of the ribat also reused many of the architectural elements of the Roman epoch, that identifiable by the inscriptions, already identified by Fernandes and de Holanda during their excavations in the 16th century.

The importance of the sanctuary during the Roman period is reflected in the votive inscriptions, expressing health to the Emperor and long life to the Empire. These wishes are not normally associated with particular devotees, nor by local or provincial elites, but suggest that they were contracted by members of the Imperial class, namely governors of Lusitania or Imperial legates, by way of the Senate of Olissipo. The inscriptions were dedicated by Sextus Tigidius Perennis, governor of Lusitania, to the Soli et Lunae in 185 AD; between 200 and 209 by Junius Celanius, a governor, to the Soli aeterno Lunae and by Caius Julius Celsus, procurator province Lusitaniae in the late 2nd century.

During excavations an inscription was recovered that attests to the importance of the location, since it was dedicated to the Sun and the Ocean, by a procurator. In addition to the altar and funerary inscription, there were other Roman architectural elements discovered on the site, including framed pots, fragments of columns and altars and large blocks for construction.

== See also ==
- Archaeological Museum of São Miguel de Odrinhas
- Olisipo
