= Azóia, Sintra =

Village in the municipality of Sintra, Portugal

Coordinates: 38.776°N 9.481°W

Azóia is a village in the municipality of Sintra (freguesia Colares) in the southwest of the district of Lisbon, Portugal. Azóia lies 1 km from the Cabo da Roca, the most westerly point of the European continent, which makes it the westernmost village on the European continent.

The main church, the "Igreja de Nossa Senhora da Saúde" ("Our Lady of Health", the patron saint of Azóia) stands somewhat decentralized in the village. It is the newest church in the freguesia of Colares. The church was designed by architects José Cornélio da Silva and José Baganha, winner of the Rafael Manzano Prize. Construction began in 1987; the church was inaugurated on September 23, 1995 by the Cardinal-Patriarch of Lisbon Dom António Ribeiro.

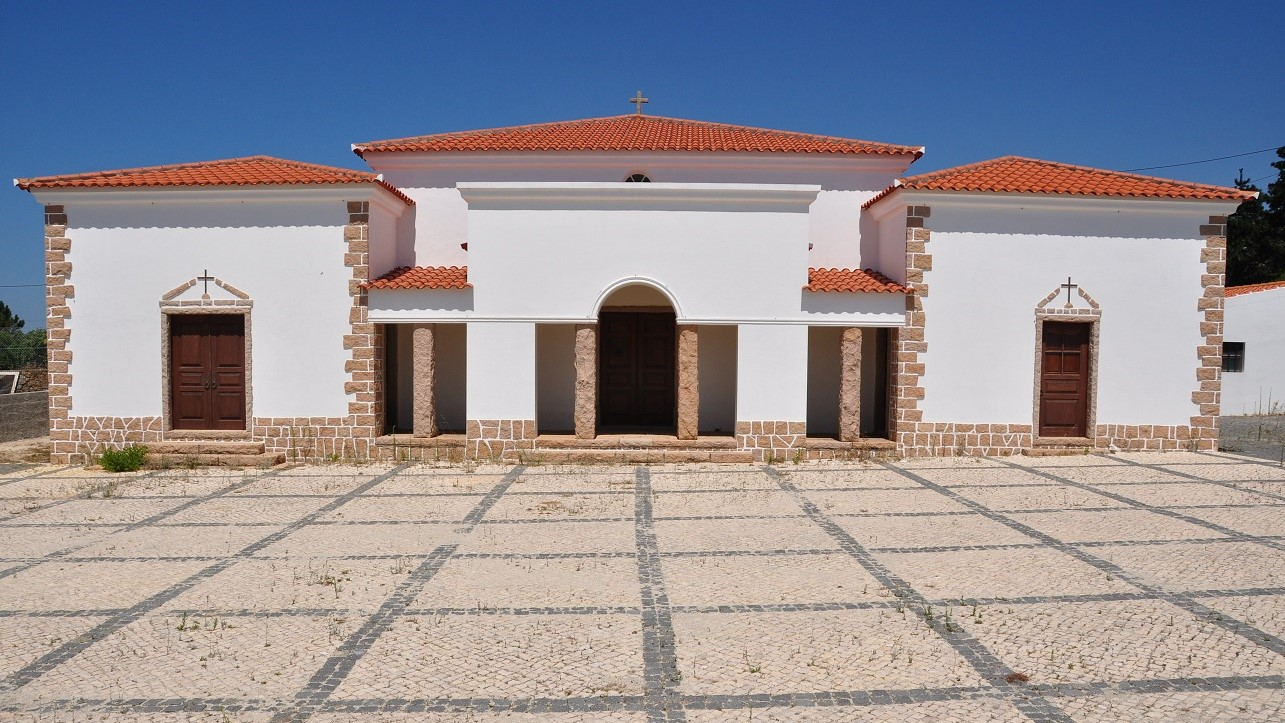
Igreja de Nossa Senhora da Saúde

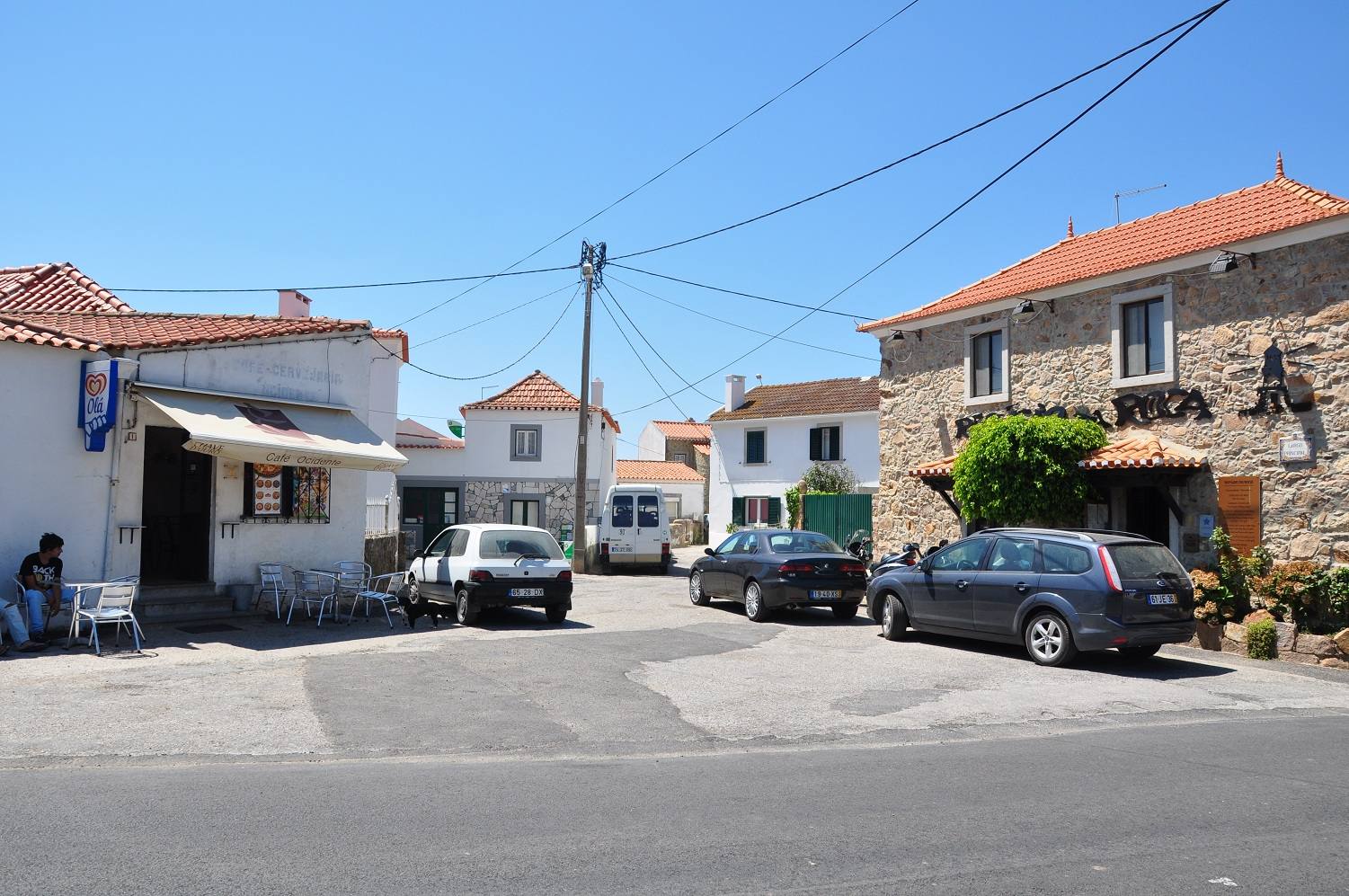
The main square (Largo Principal) of Azóia
