= Roman villa of Santo André de Almoçageme =

Roman ruins of Santo André de Almoçageme
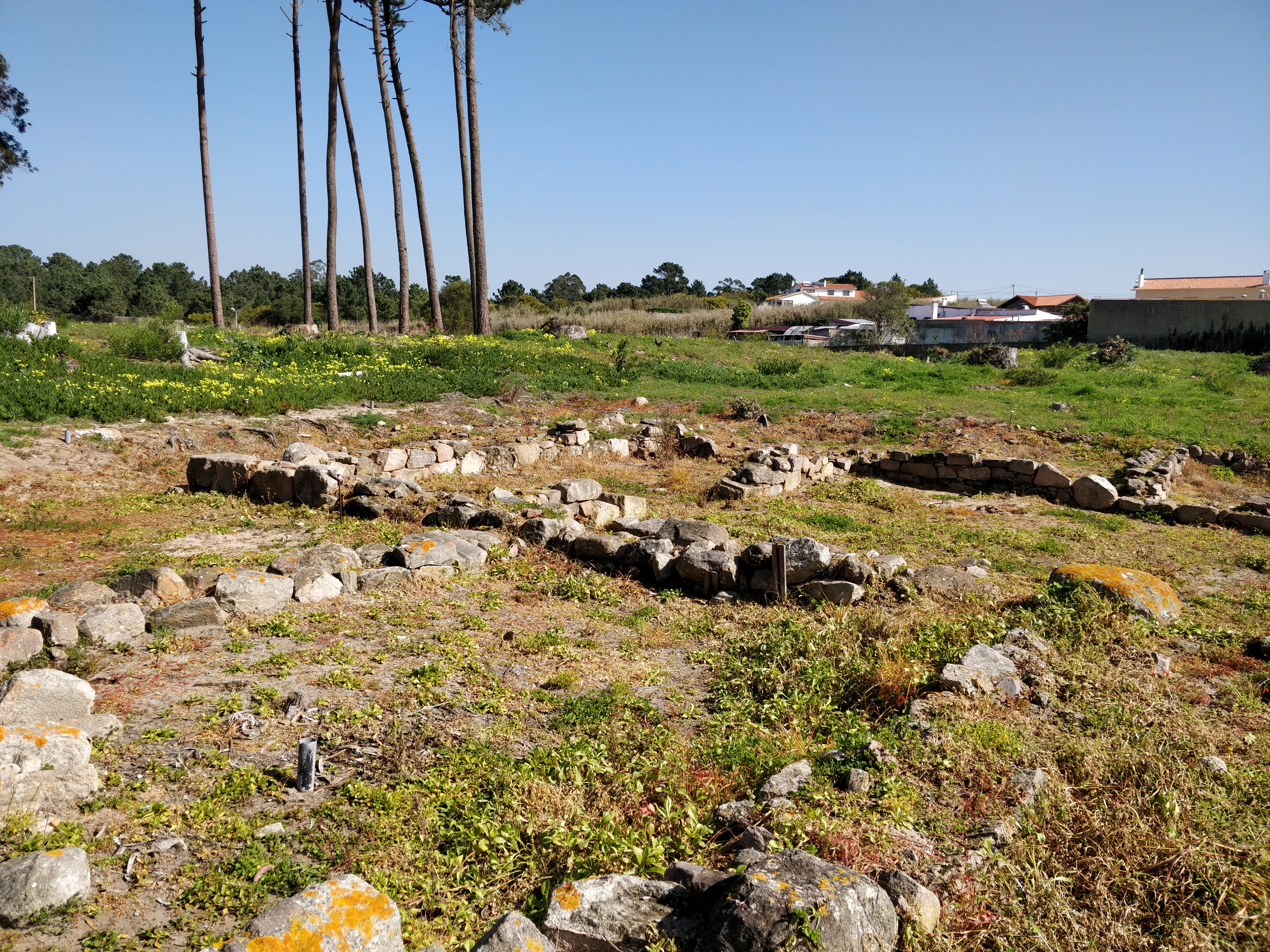
- Interactive map of Roman ruins of Santo André de Almoçageme
- 38°48′01″N 9°28′05″W
- Type: Ruins
- Location: Lisbon, Greater Lisbon, Lisbon, Portugal

Site notes
- Archaeologists: unknown
- Owner: Portuguese Republic
- Public access: Public Roadway to Rodízio, Santo André de Almoçageme

The Roman ruins of Santo Andre de Almoçageme (Portuguese: Ruinas romanas de Santo Andre de Almoçageme) is a Portuguese archaeological site located in the rural civil parish of Colares, in the municipality of Sintra. It includes a group of structures with typological, stylistic or historic value, whose structural elements are worthy of preservation.

== History ==
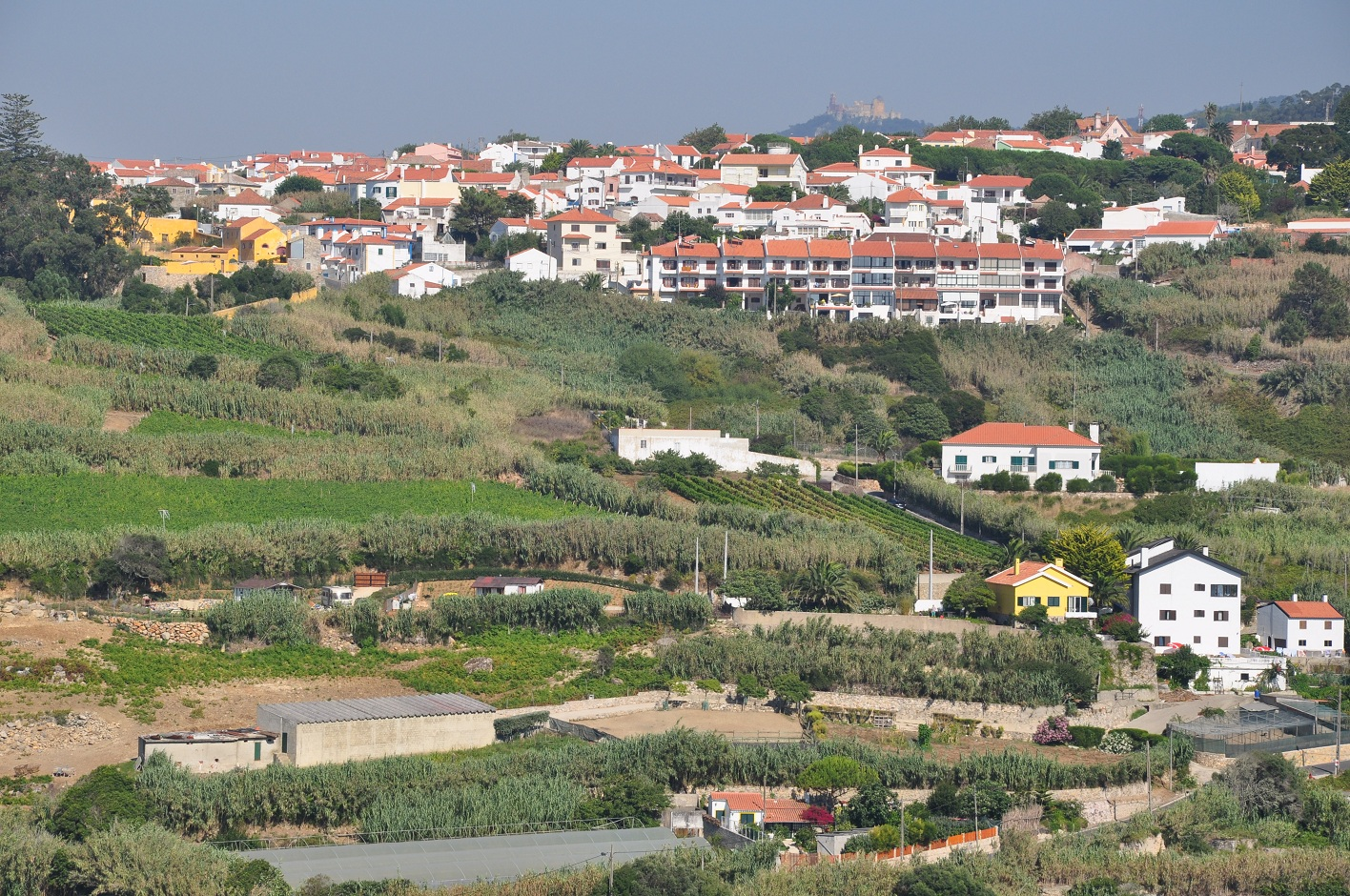
The village of Santo Andre de Almoçageme

The settlement was constructed between the 3rd and 5th centuries.

In the 17th century a funerary inscription, unrelated to the physical structures was discovered, implying a more intricate history.

In 1905, a polychromatic mosaic was discovered, in addition to artefacts linked to its Roman history. The first official archaeological excavations began between 1980 and 1990: these excavations exposed a large area of the main house (pars urbana) that included several rooms with mosaic pavements to the north (that included peristyle). In the excavated pars rustica a brick oven was discovered, used for producing ceramics. Later, the structures became derelict and in the adjoining spaces a grave was discovered, where two newborn children were buried.

== Architecture ==
Inscriptions along the perimeter of the triangular plan are delimited by a metallic fence, defining the structures of the town. The settlement includes walls composed of irregular masonry 30–40 centimetres (12–16 in) in height. Its plan essentially comprises various rectangular spaces, many corresponding to halls and paved with mosaics (in the north and west).

In the excavated areas, there are two rectangular, plaster tanks: one situated at the end of the wall and the other irregular, located near a bunk of tiles. Also located near the excavated zone is a brick oven and child's burial grave, both near to each other.

== See also ==
- Olisipo
