= Azóia, Sesimbra =

Coordinates: 38.432°N 9.184°W

Azóia is a town in the municipality of Sesimbra, parish of Castelo, near Cabo Espichel. As of 2015, Azoia had a population of 219, with 110 males and 109 females. The median age, as of 2015, was 40.6. Since 1975, the population has increased by 49%, from 66 to 219 in 2015. As of 2015 the HDI (Human Development Index) was 0.8767.
