= Colares DOC =

Wine region in Portugal

Colares is a Portuguese wine region centred on the Colares parish in the municipality of Sintra. The region has Portugal's highest wine classification of Denominação de Origem Controlada (DOC). Located along the southwestern Atlantic coast, vineyards in the area are protected from the strong ocean winds by sandy dunes. In the 1940s, vineyards covered about 2,500 acres but have since been reduced by suburbanization to 50 acres. Between 1934 and 1994, only the local co-op could use the Colares appellation. Because grapevines there are grown directly in the sand, and phylloxera aphids cannot live on sand, Colares vineyards are some of the only European vines that are not grafted upon American rootstocks. The ungrafted Ramisco vines of the Colares region are some of the oldest in Portugal. The region is known for its deep colored, full bodied red wines that are high in astringent tannins.

== Grapes ==
The principal grapes of the Colares region includes Arinto, Galego Dourado, Jampal, Malvasia and Ramisco. Red wines, which make up 75% of production, are grown from Ramisco grape and are aged over ten years before being marketed. White wines, grown from a local variant of Malvasia, are not aged as long.

== See also ==
- List of Portuguese wine regions
