= Jinmu Cape =

Cape on Hainan Island, China

Jinmu Cape 锦母角 (Chinese)
- Cape
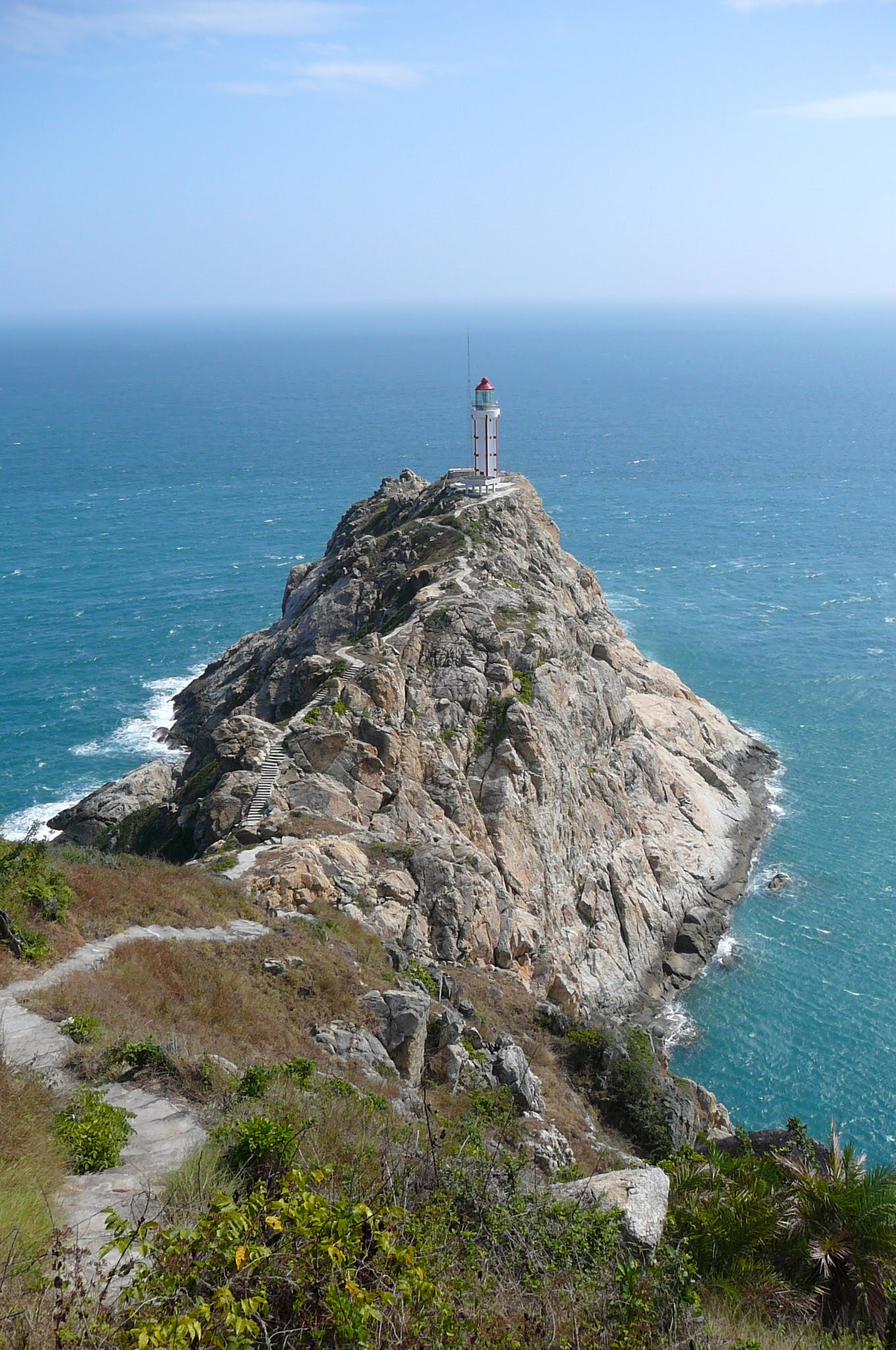

- Location within Hainan Location within China
- Coordinates: 18.16047°N 109.573525°E

Jinmu Cape, is administered as part of Sanya City, Hainan Island, China. It is some 20 km (12 mi) from Sanya itself. The cape is notable for being the southernmost point of China (China's territorial claims to the Spratly Islands notwithstanding). A lighthouse is situated upon it.

In 1996, the Chinese government announced that Jinmu Cape was to be considered one of China's maritime baselines.
