= Cabo da Roca =

Cape of the Sintra Mountain Range, Portugal

Cape Roca Cabo da Roca (Portuguese)

- Location within Portugal
- Coordinates: 38°46′51″N 9°30′2″W
- Location: Portugal, Lisboa, Lisbon, Sintra
- Part of: Serra da Sintra, Sintra-Cascais Natural Park
- Etymology: Roca: Portuguese for sea cliff
- Elevation: 140 m (460 ft)

Cabo da Roca (Portuguese: [ˈkaβu dɐ ˈʁɔkɐ]) or Cape Roca is a cape which forms the westernmost point of the Sintra Mountain Range, of mainland Portugal, of continental Europe, and of the Eurasian landmass. It is located in the municipality of Sintra, near Azóia, to the west of Lisbon. Notably, the point includes a lighthouse that started operation in 1772.

== History ==
Cabo da Roca was known to the Romans as Promontorium Magnum and during the Age of Sail as the Rock of Lisbon.

=== Lighthouse ===
The Cabo da Roca Lighthouse (Portuguese: Farol do Cabo da Roca) is a beacon/lighthouse located 165 metres (541 ft) above the Atlantic Ocean, on Portugal's (and continental Europe's) most westerly extent. It is located in the civil parish of Colares, in the municipality of Sintra, situated on a promontory made up of granite boulders and interspersed limestone. It is a third-order lighthouse, which originally began operating in 1772. It was the first new purpose-built lighthouse to be constructed in the country; the older lighthouses in existence at that time were constructed on existing platforms or from pre-existing beacons.

== Geography ==
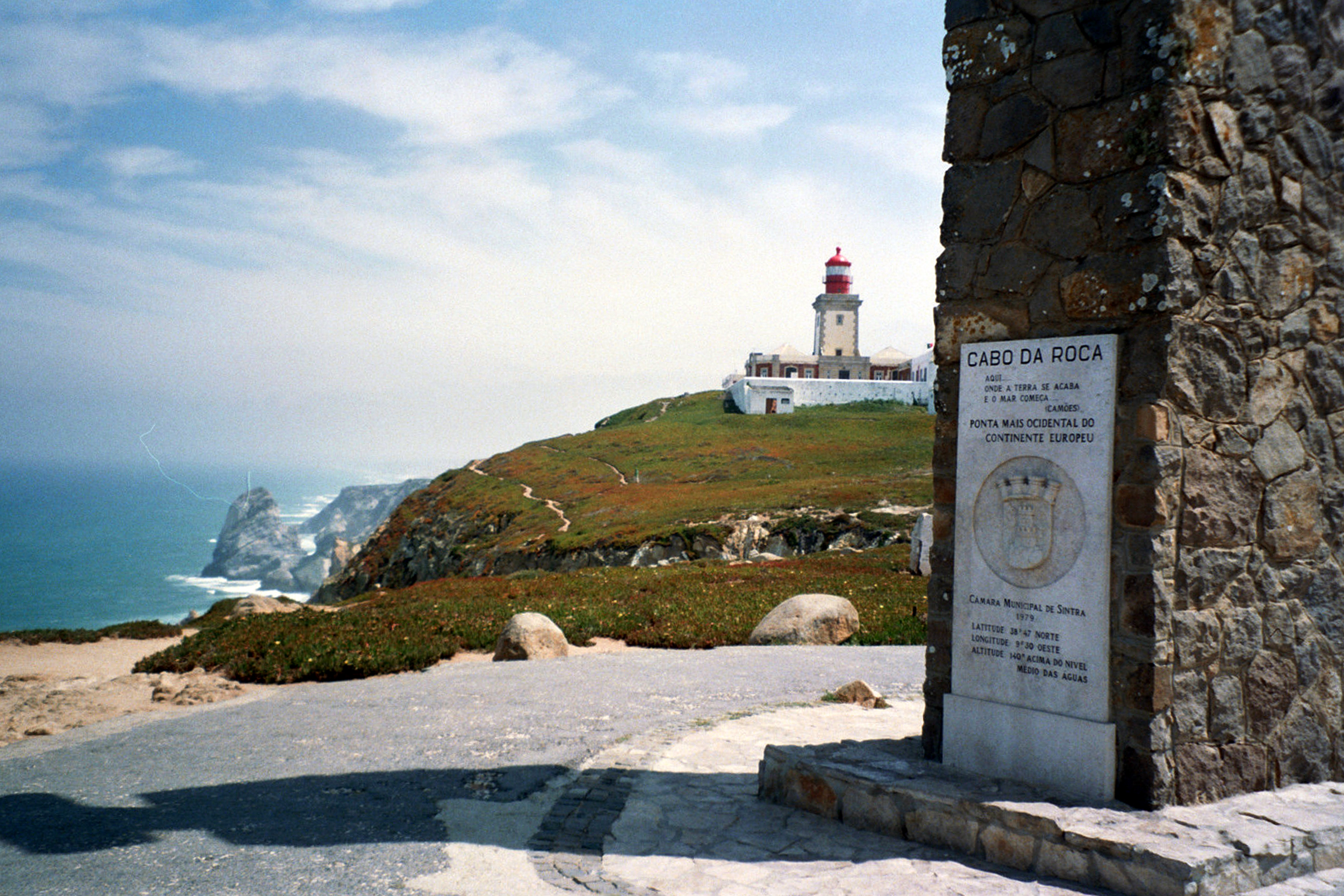
Monument announcing Cabo da Roca as the westernmost point of continental Europe

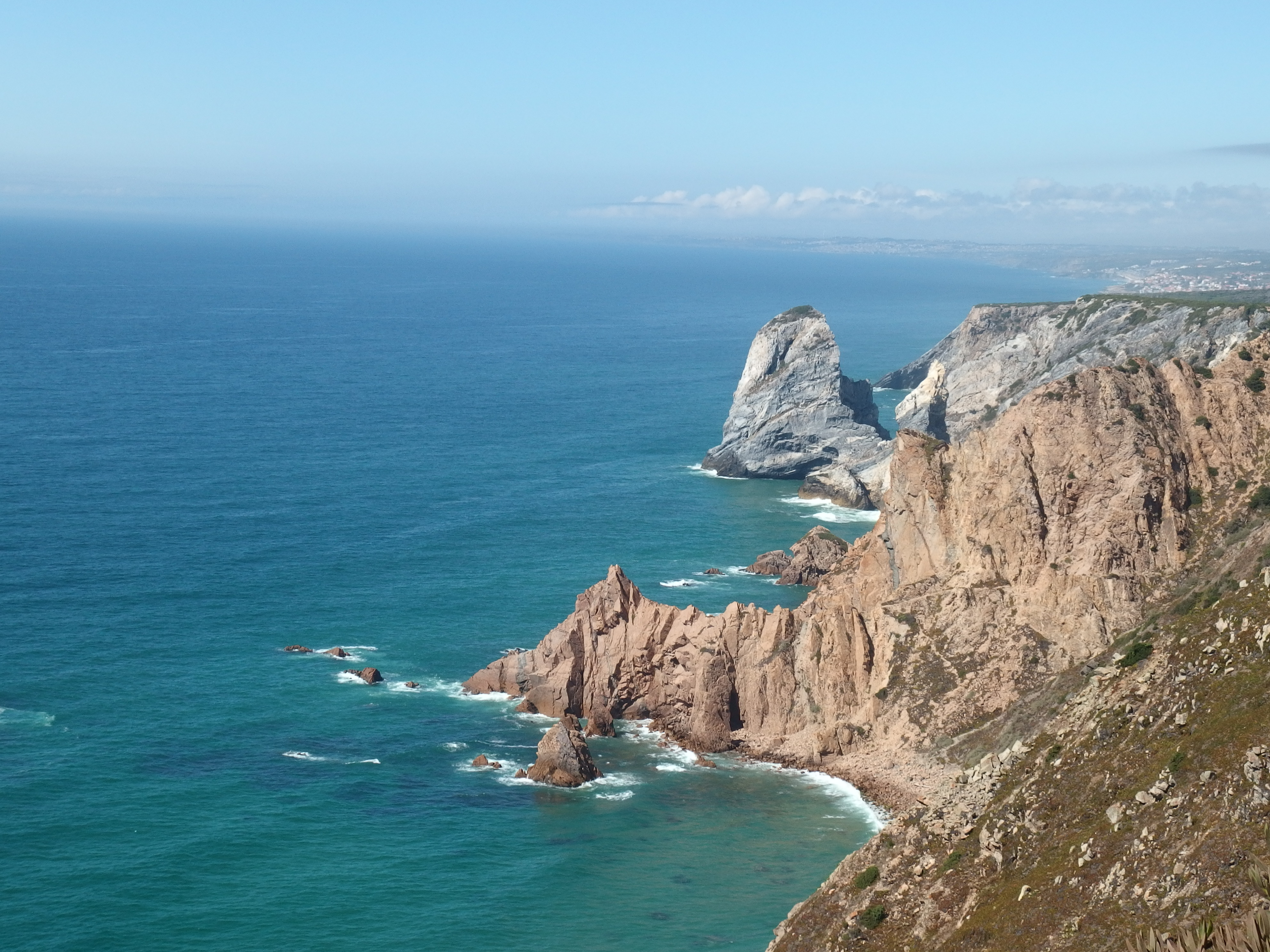
Granite boulders and sea cliffs along the coast, north of the cape

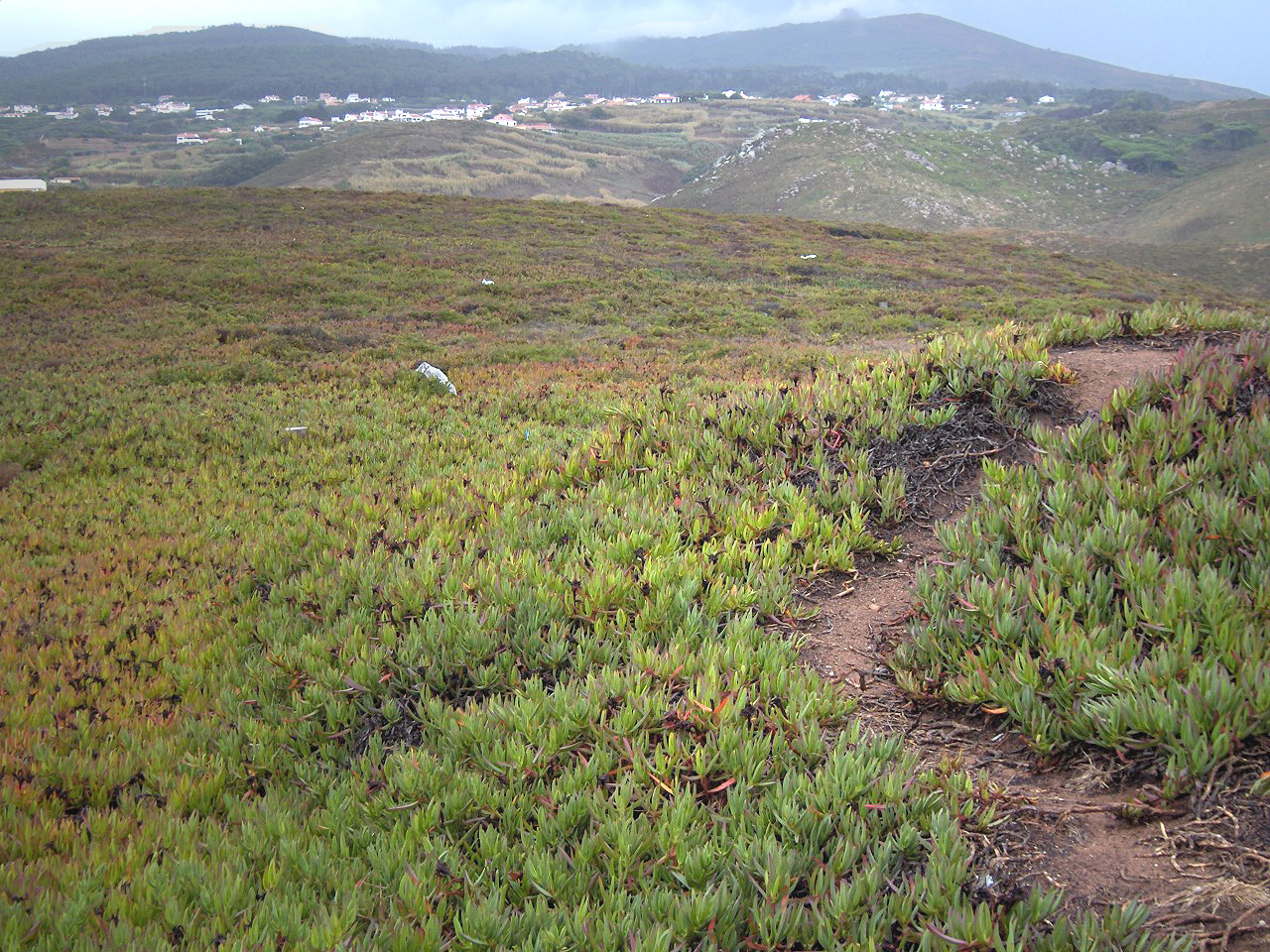
Invasive Carpobrotus edulis growing on the cape plateau

The cape is within the Sintra-Cascais Natural Park, 42 kilometres west of the city of Lisbon and in the southwest of Sintra. A location (38°47′N 9°30′W) is inscribed on a stone plaque, located on a monument at the site.

The western coast is a mixture of sandy beaches and rocky cliff promontories: around Cabo da Roca, cliffs are more than 100 metres in height, and cut into crystalline rocks, composed of strongly folded and faulted sedimentary units. These forms are disturbed by dikes and small beaches. This promontory of "high" beaches is the extreme western immersion of the ancient eruptive Sintra massif, as evident from the rose-coloured granite in the north and syenite of the Ribeira do Louriçal in the south. In the vicinity of the Cape, there are geomorphological examples of gabbro-diorite, volcanic breccia, and granite.

Part of the granite formations show evidence of strong coastal erosion, while in other areas there are limestone deposits embedded in the granite.

Much of the vegetation on this cape is low-lying and adapted to saltwater and windy conditions. Once home to a variety of plant life, Cabo da Roca has been overrun with the invasive plant species Carpobrotus edulis. This creeping, mat-forming plant, a member of the Aizoaceae succulent family, was introduced as ground cover by local residents several decades ago, but now covers much of the arable land on Cabo da Roca.

Many migratory and marine birds roost temporarily along the cliffs and protected coves of the coastal area.

=== Climate ===
The climate present at Cape Roca is extremely moderated by the ocean. Due to seasonal upwelling, the area comprising the cape has cool, stable summers with little to no rainfall but very common occurrences of fog which boosts the humidity and decreases insolation. Summer is also the windiest season of the year with July and August averaging around 15 km/h (9.3 mph). On the other hand, winters are rainy and have mild temperatures especially during the night, though the amount of precipitation received in this season is unparalleled with other places nearby such as the Sintra Mountains which can receive triple that precipitation. Due to the seasonal lag, September is warmer than July.

Climate data for Cabo da Roca (Lighthouse), 1991–2020 normals, 1940–1966 sun hours, 1961-1990 humidity, altitude: 142 m (466 ft), extremes (1981-present)
Month	Jan	Feb	Mar	Apr	May	Jun	Jul	Aug	Sep	Oct	Nov	Dec	Year
Record high °C (°F)	22.0 (71.6)	22.8 (73.0)	28.0 (82.4)	28.0 (82.4)	32.6 (90.7)	39.5 (103.1)	36.5 (97.7)	40.0 (104.0)	38.0 (100.4)	31.5 (88.7)	25.0 (77.0)	22.0 (71.6)	40.0 (104.0)
Mean daily maximum °C (°F)	14.3 (57.7)	14.5 (58.1)	16.0 (60.8)	16.8 (62.2)	18.6 (65.5)	20.3 (68.5)	20.9 (69.6)	21.9 (71.4)	21.5 (70.7)	20.1 (68.2)	17.1 (62.8)	15.3 (59.5)	18.1 (64.6)
Daily mean °C (°F)	12.1 (53.8)	12.3 (54.1)	13.5 (56.3)	14.3 (57.7)	16.0 (60.8)	17.8 (64.0)	18.5 (65.3)	19.2 (66.6)	19.0 (66.2)	17.7 (63.9)	14.9 (58.8)	13.2 (55.8)	15.7 (60.3)
Mean daily minimum °C (°F)	10.0 (50.0)	10.0 (50.0)	11.0 (51.8)	11.9 (53.4)	13.5 (56.3)	15.2 (59.4)	16.0 (60.8)	16.5 (61.7)	16.4 (61.5)	15.3 (59.5)	12.8 (55.0)	11.1 (52.0)	13.3 (56.0)
Record low °C (°F)	0.5 (32.9)	1.0 (33.8)	0.0 (32.0)	5.5 (41.9)	5.5 (41.9)	8.5 (47.3)	6.5 (43.7)	7.5 (45.5)	8.5 (47.3)	2.0 (35.6)	2.0 (35.6)	3.5 (38.3)	0.0 (32.0)
Average precipitation mm (inches)	55.4 (2.18)	46.7 (1.84)	42.1 (1.66)	41.1 (1.62)	35.4 (1.39)	10.3 (0.41)	3.2 (0.13)	6.2 (0.24)	23.7 (0.93)	69.5 (2.74)	77.4 (3.05)	58.7 (2.31)	469.7 (18.5)
Average precipitation days (≥ 1 mm)	8.7	6.2	6.3	6.3	5.1	1.8	0.5	0.9	3.3	8.0	9.0	8.3	64.4
Average relative humidity (%)	78	81	80	79	82	85	86	86	85	80	78	80	82
Mean monthly sunshine hours	136.4	146.9	167.4	216.0	248.0	246.0	272.8	275.9	219.0	204.6	147.0	139.5	2,419.5
Percentage possible sunshine	45	48	45	55	56	55	60	65	59	59	49	47	54
Source: IPMA

Average wind speed (km/h) 1961–1990
	Jan	Feb	Mar	Apr	May	Jun	Jul	Aug	Sep	Oct	Nov	Dec	Year
Cabo da Roca	13.5	14.1	13.6	13.0	13.0	13.7	15.0	15.2	13.6	13.6	13.7	13.8	13.8

== See also ==
- Extreme points of Europe
- Cape Finisterre
- Pointe de Corsen
- Cape Nordkinn
- Land's End

== Notes ==
- Fonseca, António Oliveira (November 2010), Relatório da Visita ao Parque Natural Sintra-Cascais (PDF) (in Portuguese), Lisbon, Portugal: Universidade Aberta, archived from the original (PDF) on 24 April 2012
- Scheffers, Anja; Kelletat, Dieter (2005), "Tsunami Relics on the Coastal Landscape West of Lisbon, Portugal", Science of Tsunami Hazards (PDF), vol. 23, Essen, Germany: University of Duisburg-Essen, pp. 3–16
