= Ramisco =

Variety of grape

- Grape (Vitis)
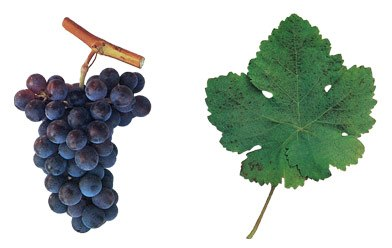
- Color of berry skin: Noir
- Species: Vitis vinifera
- Also called: Rasmisco nos Açores
- Origin: Portugal
- Formation of seeds: Complete
- Sex of flowers: Hermaphrodite
- VIVC number: 9899

Ramisco is a red Portuguese wine grape variety that is planted primarily in the Colares DOC. As a varietal, Ramisco produces very tannic and astringent wines.

== Synonyms ==
There are three synonyms of Ramisco: Ramisco de Colares, Rasmisco nos Açores and Ramisco Tinto.

== See also ==
- List of Portuguese grape varieties
