= List of administrative divisions of Hainan =

Hainan Province
- Province
- Capital: Haikou

Prefecture-level divisions
- Prefectural cities: 4

County level divisions
- County cities: 5
- Counties: 4
- Autonomous counties: 6
- Districts: 10

Township level divisions
- Towns: 183
- Townships: 21
- Subdistricts: 18

Villages level divisions
- Communities: 517
- Administrative villages: 2,553
- Danzhou districts are not counted into the figures above. However Sansha management committees are counted as towns.

Hainan uses a slightly different administrative system from other administrative regions of China. In Hainan, nearly all county-level divisions (the eight districts excepted) come directly under the province. This method of division is due to Hainan's relatively sparse population. However, it is planned that the counties and cities in Hainan (excluding Sansha) would be merged into five city-level cities, just like those in mainland China.

== Administrative divisions ==
Prefecture level (Division code)	County Level				
Prefecture level (Division code)	Name	Chinese	Hanyu Pinyin	Division code	
Haikou city 海口市; Hǎikǒu Shì (Capital) (4601 / HAK)	Xiuying District	秀英区	Xiùyīng Qū	460105	XYH
Haikou city 海口市; Hǎikǒu Shì (Capital) (4601 / HAK)	Longhua District	龙华区	Lónghuá Qū	460106	LOH
Haikou city 海口市; Hǎikǒu Shì (Capital) (4601 / HAK)	Qiongshan District	琼山区	Qióngshān Qū	460107	QOS
Haikou city 海口市; Hǎikǒu Shì (Capital) (4601 / HAK)	Meilan District	美兰区	Měilán Qū	460108	MEL
Sanya city 三亚市; Sānyà Shì (4602 / SYX)	Haitang District	海棠区	Hǎitáng Qū	460202	HTN
Sanya city 三亚市; Sānyà Shì (4602 / SYX)	Jiyang District	吉阳区	Jíyáng Qū	460203	JYV
Sanya city 三亚市; Sānyà Shì (4602 / SYX)	Tianya District	天涯区	Tiānyá Qū	460204	TYA
Sanya city 三亚市; Sānyà Shì (4602 / SYX)	Yazhou District	崖州区	Yázhōu Qū	460205	YZB
Sansha city (Note: Sansha city is administered partially by the People's Republic of China. Sansha city is also claimed and administered partially by Taiwan (Republic of China), Brunei, Malaysia, the Philippines, and Vietnam.) 三沙市; Sānshā Shì (4603 / SSB)	Xisha District	西沙区	Xīshā Qū	460302	
Sansha city 三沙市; Sānshā Shì (4603 / SSB)	Nansha District	南沙区	Nánshā Qū	460303	
Danzhou city 儋州市; Dānzhōu Shì (4604 / DNZ)	Chengqu Area (Note: These districts within Danzhou are not formal administrative subdivisions recognized by the Ministry of Civil Affairs.)	城区片区	Chéngqū Piànqū	460401	DNZ
Danzhou city 儋州市; Dānzhōu Shì (4604 / DNZ)	Binhai Area	滨海片区	Bīnhǎi Piànqū	460401	DNZ
Directly administered (4690)
Directly administered (4690)	Wuzhishan city	五指山市	Wǔzhǐshān Shì	469001	WZN
Directly administered (4690)	Qionghai city	琼海市	Qiónghǎi Shì	469002	QHA
Directly administered (4690)	Wenchang city	文昌市	Wénchāng Shì	469005	WEC
Directly administered (4690)	Wanning city	万宁市	Wànníng Shì	469006	WNN
Directly administered (4690)	Dongfang city	东方市	Dōngfāng Shì	469007	DFG
Directly administered (4690)	Ding'an County	定安县	Dìng'ān Xiàn	469021	DIA
Directly administered (4690)	Tunchang County	屯昌县	Túnchāng Xiàn	469022	TCG
Directly administered (4690)	Chengmai County	澄迈县	Chéngmài Xiàn	469023	CMA
Directly administered (4690)	Lingao County	临高县	Língāo Xiàn	469024	LGO
Directly administered (4690)	Baisha County (Note: Conventional name: Baisha Li Autonomous County; Chinese: 白沙黎族自治县; pinyin: Báishā Lízú Zìzhìxiàn)	白沙县	Báishā Xiàn	469025	BSX
Directly administered (4690)	Changjiang County (Note: Conventional name: Changjiang Li Autonomous County; Chinese: 昌江黎族自治县; pinyin: Chāngjiāng Lízú Zìzhìxiàn)	昌江县	Chāngjiāng Xiàn	469026	CJX
Directly administered (4690)	Ledong County (Note: Conventional name: Ledong Li Autonomous County; Chinese: 乐东黎族自治县; pinyin: Lèdōng Lízú Zìzhìxiàn)	乐东县	Lèdōng Xiàn	469027	LED
Directly administered (4690)	Lingshui County (Note: Conventional name: Lingshui Li Autonomous County; Chinese: 陵水黎族自治县; pinyin: Língshuǐ Lízú Zìzhìxiàn)	陵水县	Língshuǐ Xiàn	469028	LSL
Directly administered (4690)	Baoting County (Note: Conventional name: Baoting Li and Miao Autonomous County; Chinese: 保亭黎族苗族自治县; pinyin: Bǎotíng Lízú Miáozú Zìzhìxiàn)	保亭县	Bǎotíng Xiàn	469029	BTG
Directly administered (4690)	Qiongzhong County (Note: Conventional name: Qiongzhong Li and Miao Autonomous County; Chinese: 琼中黎族苗族自治县; pinyin: Qióngzhōng Lízú Miáozú Zìzhìxiàn)	琼中县	Qióngzhōng Xiàn	469030	QZG

== Administrative divisions history ==
=== Recent changes in administrative divisions ===
Date	Before	After	Note	Reference
1988-04-13	parts of Guangdong Province	Hainan Province	provincial established	Civil Affairs Announcement
1988-04-13	Haikou (PL-City) city district	Haikou (PL-City) city district	transferred	Civil Affairs Announcement
1988-04-13	Sanya (PL-City) city district	Sanya (PL-City) city district	transferred	Civil Affairs Announcement
1988-04-13	Hainan Administrative Region	provincial-controlled	disestablished & transferred	Civil Affairs Announcement
1988-04-13	↳ Tongshi (CL-City)	↳ Tongshi (CL-City)	transferred	Civil Affairs Announcement
1988-04-13	↳ Qiongshan County	↳ Qiongshan County	transferred	Civil Affairs Announcement
1988-04-13	↳ Qionghai County	↳ Qionghai County	transferred	Civil Affairs Announcement
1988-04-13	↳ Wenchang County	↳ Wenchang County	transferred	Civil Affairs Announcement
1988-04-13	↳ Wanning County	↳ Wanning County	transferred	Civil Affairs Announcement
1988-04-13	↳ Tunchang County	↳ Tunchang County	transferred	Civil Affairs Announcement
1988-04-13	↳ Ding'an County	↳ Ding'an County	transferred	Civil Affairs Announcement
1988-04-13	↳ Chengmai County	↳ Chengmai County	transferred	Civil Affairs Announcement
1988-04-13	↳ Lingao County	↳ Lingao County	transferred	Civil Affairs Announcement
1988-04-13	↳ Dan County	↳ Dan County	transferred	Civil Affairs Announcement
1988-04-13	↳ Baisha County (Aut.)	↳ Baisha County (Aut.)	transferred	Civil Affairs Announcement
1988-04-13	↳ Changjiang County (Aut.)	↳ Changjiang County (Aut.)	transferred	Civil Affairs Announcement
1988-04-13	↳ Ledong County (Aut.)	↳ Ledong County (Aut.)	transferred	Civil Affairs Announcement
1988-04-13	↳ Lingshui County (Aut.)	↳ Lingshui County (Aut.)	transferred	Civil Affairs Announcement
1988-04-13	↳ Baoting County (Aut.)	↳ Baoting County (Aut.)	transferred	Civil Affairs Announcement
1988-04-13	↳ Qiongzhong County (Aut.)	↳ Qiongzhong County (Aut.)	transferred	Civil Affairs Announcement
1988-04-13	↳ Dongfang County (Aut.)	↳ Dongfang County (Aut.)	transferred	Civil Affairs Announcement
1988-04-13	↳ Xisha, Nansha, and Zhongsha Islands; Authority (CL-Administration Office)	↳ Xisha, Nansha, and Zhongsha Islands; Authority (CL-Administration Office)	transferred	Civil Affairs Announcement
1990-11-15	Haikou (PL-City) city district	Zhendong District	established	
1990-11-15	Haikou (PL-City) city district	Xinhua District	established	
1990-11-15	Haikou (PL-City) city district	Xiuying District	established	
1992-11-06	Qionghai County	Qionghai (CL-City)	reorganized	Civil Affairs [1992]132
1993-03-03	Danzhou County	Danzhou (CL-City)	reorganized	Civil Affairs [1993]45
1994-01-24	Qiongshan County	Qiongshan (CL-City)	reorganized	Civil Affairs [1994]26
1995-11-07	Wenchang County	Wenchang (CL-City)	reorganized	Civil Affairs [1995]77
1996-08-05	Wanning County	Wanning (CL-City)	reorganized	Civil Affairs [1996]53
1997-04-22	Dongfang County (Aut.)	Dongfang (CL-City)	reorganized	Civil Affairs [1997]4
2001-07-05	Tongshen (CL-City)	Wuzhishan (CL-City)	renamed	Civil Affairs [2001]170
2002-10-16	Qiongshan (CL-City)	Qiongshan District	reorganized	State Council [2002]92
2002-10-16	Zhendong District	Meilan District	renamed	State Council [2002]92
2002-10-16	Xinhua District	Longhua District	renamed	State Council [2002]92
2012-06-21	provincial-controlled	Sansha (PL-City) city district	established	State Council [2012]51
2012-06-21	↳ Xisha, Nansha, and Zhongsha Islands; Authority (CL-Administration Office)	Sansha (PL-City) city district	established	State Council [2012]51
2014-01-25	Sanya (PL-City) city district	Jiyang District	established	State Council [2014]14
2014-01-25	Sanya (PL-City) city district	Tianya District	established	State Council [2014]14
2014-01-25	Sanya (PL-City) city district	Haitang District	established	State Council [2014]14
2014-01-25	Sanya (PL-City) city district	Yazhou District	established	State Council [2014]14
2015-02-19	provincial-controlled	Danzhou (PL-City) city district	established	State Council [2015]41
2015-02-19	↳ Danzhou (CL-City)	Danzhou (PL-City) city district	established	State Council [2015]41
2020-04-??	Sansha (PL-City) city district	Xisha District	established	
2020-04-??	Sansha (PL-City) city district	Nansha District	established	

== Population composition ==
=== Prefectures ===
Prefecture	2010	2000
Haikou	2,046,189	1,508,341
Sanya	685,408	482,296
Sansha	not established	not established
Danzhou	932,362	

=== Counties ===
Name	Prefecture	2010
Xiuying	Haikou	349,544
Longhua	Haikou	593,018
Qiongshan	Haikou	479,960
Meilan	Haikou	623,667
Jiyang	Sanya	not established
Fenghuang	Sanya	not established
Haitang	Sanya	not established
Yazhou	Sanya	not established
Xisha	Sansha	not established
Nansha	Sansha	not established
Wuzhishan	Directly administered	104,122
Qionghai	Directly administered	483,217
Wenchang	Directly administered	537,428
Wanning	Directly administered	545,597
Dongfang	Directly administered	408309
Ding'an	Directly administered	284,616
Tunchang	Directly administered	256,931
Chengmai	Directly administered	467,161
Lingao	Directly administered	427,873
Baisha	Directly administered	167,918
Changjiang	Directly administered	223,839
Ledong	Directly administered	458,876
Lingshui	Directly administered	32,046
Baoting	Directly administered	146,684
Qiongzhong	Directly administered	174,076
Yangpu	Directly administered	37,000
XNZIA (dissolved)	Directly administered	444
