= Tianya =

Tianya may refer to:

- Tianya District, Sanya, Hainan, China
  - Tianya Town (天涯镇), in Tianya District
  - Tianya Haijiao (天涯海角), tourist attraction
- Tianya Club (天涯虚拟社区), Internet forum in China
