= Lingao County =

Lingao 临高县 Limko
- County
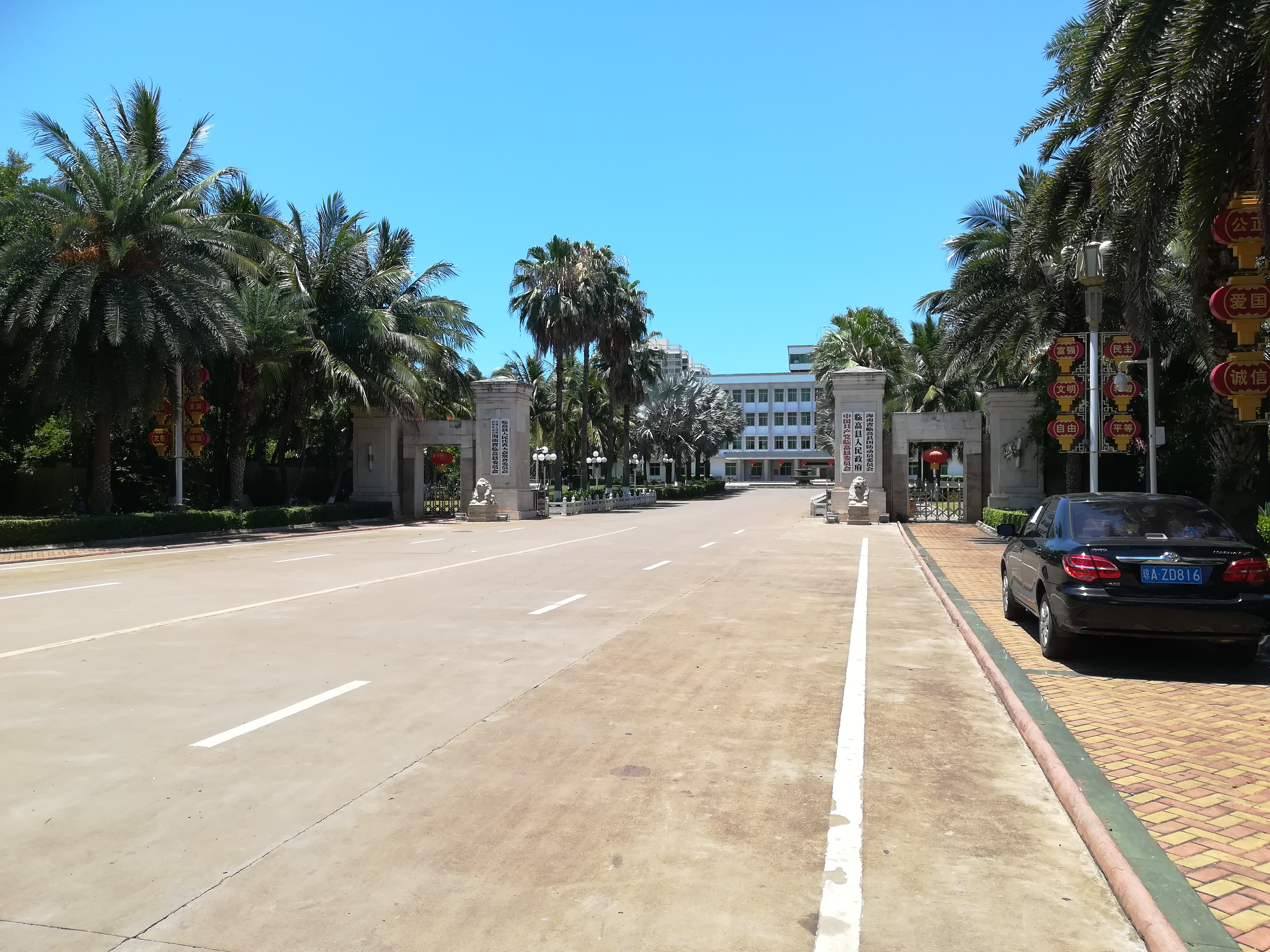

- Location of the seat in Hainan
- Coordinates: 19°57′0″N 109°41′6″E
- Country: People's Republic of China
- Province: Hainan

Area
  - Total: 1,317 km^{2} (508 sq mi)

Population (1999)
  - Total: 399,057
  - Density: 303.0/km^{2} (784.8/sq mi)
- Time zone: UTC+8 (China standard time)

Lingao County (formerly romanised as Limko or Limkao) is an administrative district in Hainan province, China. It is one of the 4 counties of Hainan. Its postal code is 571800, and in 1999, its population was 399,057 people, who mainly speak the Be language.

== Climate ==
Lingao has a tropical savanna climate (Köppen Aw).It borders the subtropical monsoon climate (Köppen Cwa).

Climate data for Lingao, elevation 32 m (105 ft), (1991–2020 normals, extremes 1967–present)
| Month | Jan | Feb | Mar | Apr | May | Jun | Jul | Aug | Sep | Oct | Nov | Dec | Year |
|---|---|---|---|---|---|---|---|---|---|---|---|---|---|
| Record high °C (°F) | 33.5 (92.3) | 36.5 (97.7) | 39.3 (102.7) | 42.8 (109.0) | 40.3 (104.5) | 39.8 (103.6) | 39.0 (102.2) | 37.0 (98.6) | 36.2 (97.2) | 33.8 (92.8) | 34.8 (94.6) | 31.8 (89.2) | 42.8 (109.0) |
| Mean daily maximum °C (°F) | 22.0 (71.6) | 23.6 (74.5) | 27.0 (80.6) | 30.5 (86.9) | 33.0 (91.4) | 34.0 (93.2) | 33.7 (92.7) | 32.7 (90.9) | 31.4 (88.5) | 29.2 (84.6) | 26.4 (79.5) | 22.8 (73.0) | 28.9 (84.0) |
| Daily mean °C (°F) | 17.8 (64.0) | 19.0 (66.2) | 21.9 (71.4) | 25.3 (77.5) | 27.8 (82.0) | 28.8 (83.8) | 28.7 (83.7) | 28.2 (82.8) | 27.1 (80.8) | 25.2 (77.4) | 22.5 (72.5) | 19.0 (66.2) | 24.3 (75.7) |
| Mean daily minimum °C (°F) | 15.1 (59.2) | 16.3 (61.3) | 18.9 (66.0) | 22.2 (72.0) | 24.4 (75.9) | 25.4 (77.7) | 25.4 (77.7) | 25.2 (77.4) | 24.4 (75.9) | 22.4 (72.3) | 19.7 (67.5) | 16.4 (61.5) | 21.3 (70.4) |
| Record low °C (°F) | 2.2 (36.0) | 5.5 (41.9) | 6.3 (43.3) | 13.4 (56.1) | 16.1 (61.0) | 20.6 (69.1) | 21.4 (70.5) | 21.9 (71.4) | 18.7 (65.7) | 13.1 (55.6) | 8.2 (46.8) | 2.6 (36.7) | 2.2 (36.0) |
| Average precipitation mm (inches) | 17.9 (0.70) | 20.3 (0.80) | 39.2 (1.54) | 49.9 (1.96) | 122.5 (4.82) | 180.6 (7.11) | 226.8 (8.93) | 326.2 (12.84) | 268.2 (10.56) | 219.9 (8.66) | 60.3 (2.37) | 30.9 (1.22) | 1,562.7 (61.51) |
| Average precipitation days (≥ 0.1 mm) | 8.6 | 8.3 | 9.0 | 8.8 | 12.1 | 15.1 | 15.2 | 15.5 | 14.5 | 10.5 | 7.8 | 7.6 | 133 |
| Average relative humidity (%) | 86 | 87 | 85 | 83 | 81 | 81 | 81 | 84 | 86 | 84 | 83 | 83 | 84 |
| Mean monthly sunshine hours | 108.4 | 109.2 | 141.5 | 172.0 | 219.2 | 212.1 | 229.3 | 208.8 | 177.5 | 175.8 | 139.2 | 106.8 | 1,999.8 |
| Percentage possible sunshine | 32 | 34 | 38 | 45 | 54 | 53 | 56 | 53 | 49 | 49 | 42 | 32 | 45 |
Source: China Meteorological Administration all-time extreme temperature All-time June Record

== Cuisine ==
Lingao suckling pig: One of the most representative traditional dishes of Lingao, known for its crispy skin, tender meat, and rich yet not greasy flavor. It is often served at festivals and banquets.

Duowen Water Spinach: A local specialty, known for its long, hollow stems and crisp texture, it is one of the more famous local vegetables in Hainan.

Lingao sandworms: a specialty seafood of the coastal area, which can be stir-fried, used in soups, or dried, and are considered to have a delicious taste.

Chive pancakes: made by frying chives and starch.

== See also ==
- List of administrative divisions of Hainan
