= Haitang, Sanya =

Haitang 海棠区
- District
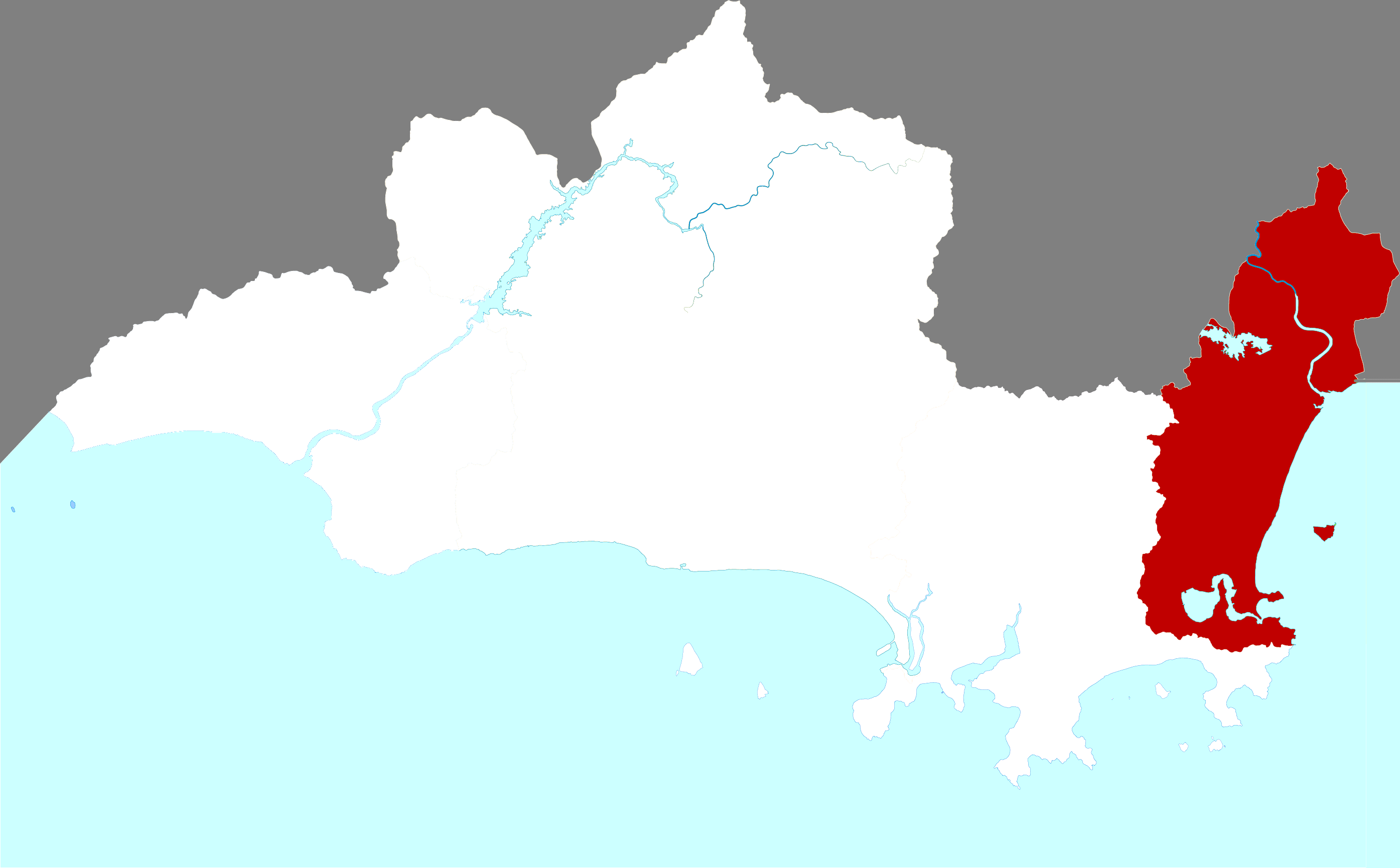
- Location of Haitang in Sanya

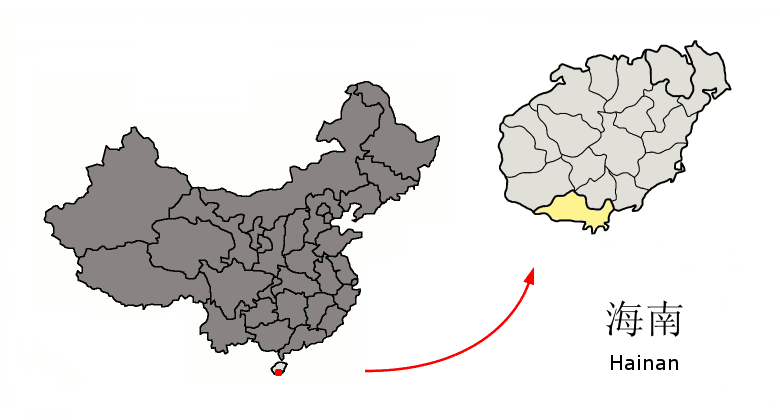
- Sanya in Hainan
- Coordinates: 18°24′27″N 109°45′39″E
- Country: People's Republic of China
- Province: Hainan
- Prefecture-level city: Sanya

Area
  - Total: 252.41 km^{2} (97.46 sq mi)

Population (2013)
  - Total: 90,000
  - Density: 360/km^{2} (920/sq mi)
- Time zone: UTC+8 (China standard time)

Haitang District (Chinese: 海棠区; pinyin: Hǎitáng Qū) is a county-level district under the jurisdiction of the city of Sanya, Hainan province, China. The district was established on 12 February 2014.

== Former administrative subdivisions ==
Haitang has jurisdiction over the former towns of:

English name	Simplified	Pinyin	Area	Population	Density
Haitangwan	海棠湾镇	Hǎitángwān Zhèn	254	44,617	176
Nantian Farm	国营南田农场	Guóyíng Nántián Nóngchǎng	N.D.	24,280	N.D.
