= Yazhou, Sanya =

Yazhou 崖州区
- District
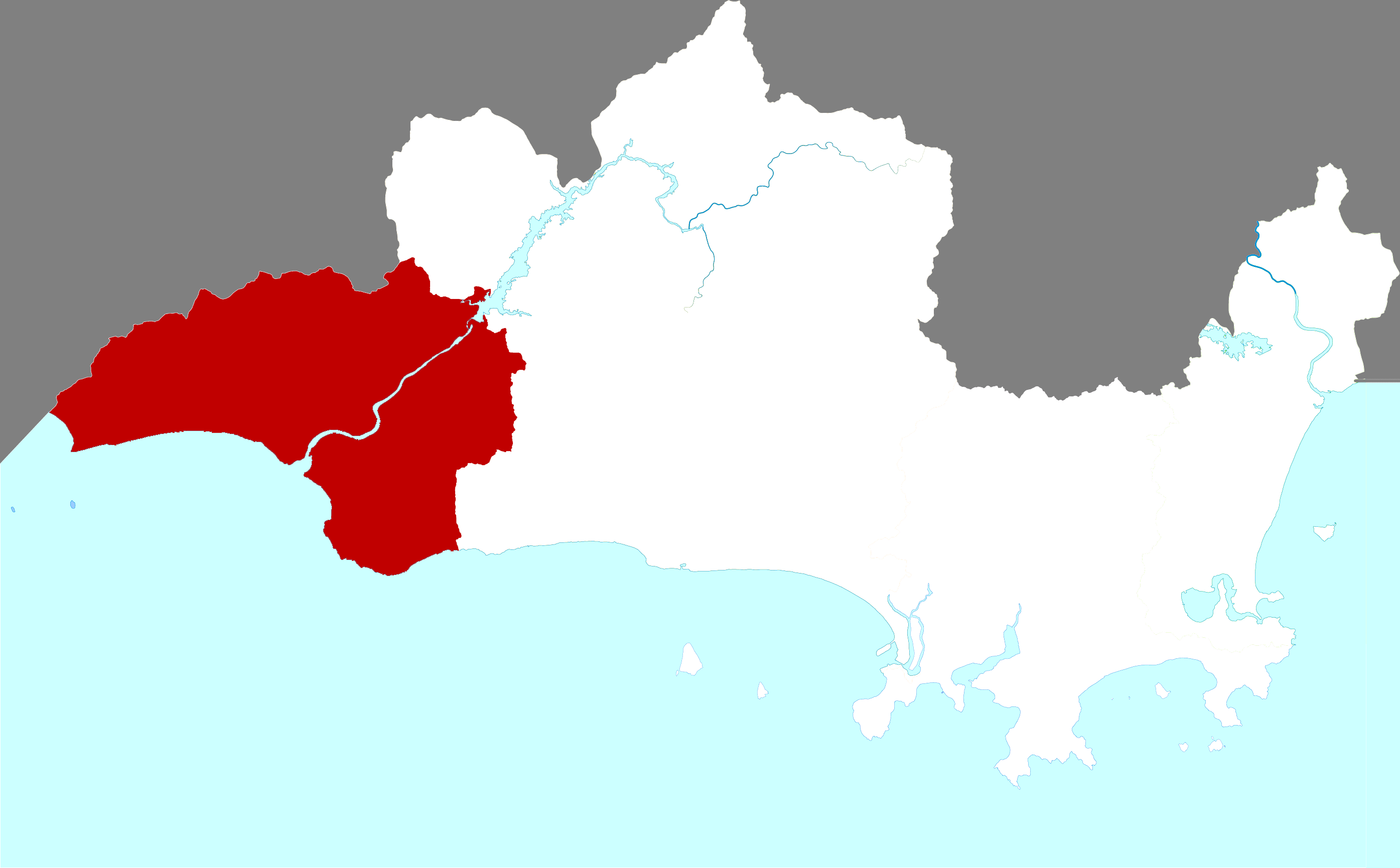
- Location of Yazhou in Sanya

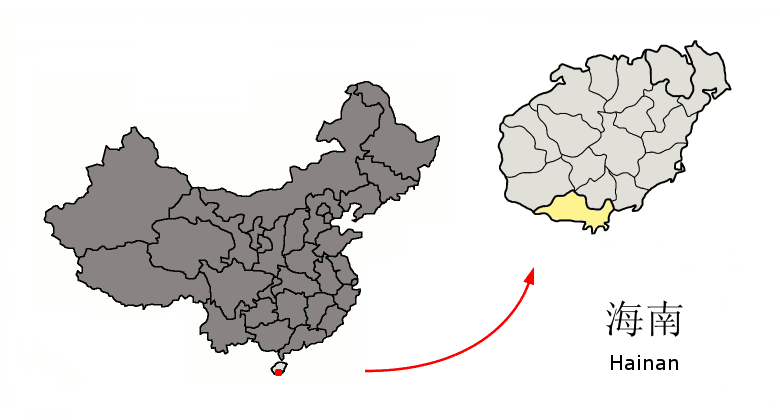
- Sanya in Hainan
- Coordinates: 18°21′25″N 109°10′19″E
- Country: People's Republic of China
- Province: Hainan
- Prefecture-level city: Sanya

Area
  - Total: 347 km^{2} (134 sq mi)

Population
  - Total: 110,000
  - Density: 320/km^{2} (820/sq mi)
- Time zone: UTC+8 (China standard time)

Yazhou, Sanya
- Simplified Chinese: 崖州区
Transcriptions
Standard Mandarin
- Hanyu Pinyin: Yázhōu Qū
- Wade–Giles: Ya^{2}-chou^{1} Ch'ü^{1}

Alternative Chinese name
- Traditional Chinese: 崖縣 (1912–1984)
- Simplified Chinese: 崖县 (1912–1984)
- Postal: Ngaihsien
Transcriptions
Standard Mandarin
- Hanyu Pinyin: Yáxiàn
- Wade–Giles: Ya^{2}-hsien^{4}

Second alternative Chinese name
- Chinese: 崖州 (until 1912; 1984–2014)
- Postal: Ngaichiu
Transcriptions
Standard Mandarin
- Hanyu Pinyin: Yázhōu
- Wade–Giles: Ya^{2}-chou^{1}

Yazhou (Chinese: 崖州区; pinyin: Yázhōu Qū) is a county-level district under the jurisdiction of the city of Sanya, Hainan. The district was established on 12 February 2014, and is Sanya's westernmost district.

== Former administrative subdivisions ==
Yazhou has jurisdiction over the former towns of:

English name	Simplified	Pinyin	Area	Population	Density
Yacheng	崖城镇	Yáchéng Zhèn	383	74,779	195
Nanbin Farm	国营南滨农场	Guóyíng Nánbīn Nóngchǎng	N.D.	14,736	N.D.
