= Sanya =

City on Hainan Island, China

Sanya 三亚市
- Prefecture-level city
- Sanya City
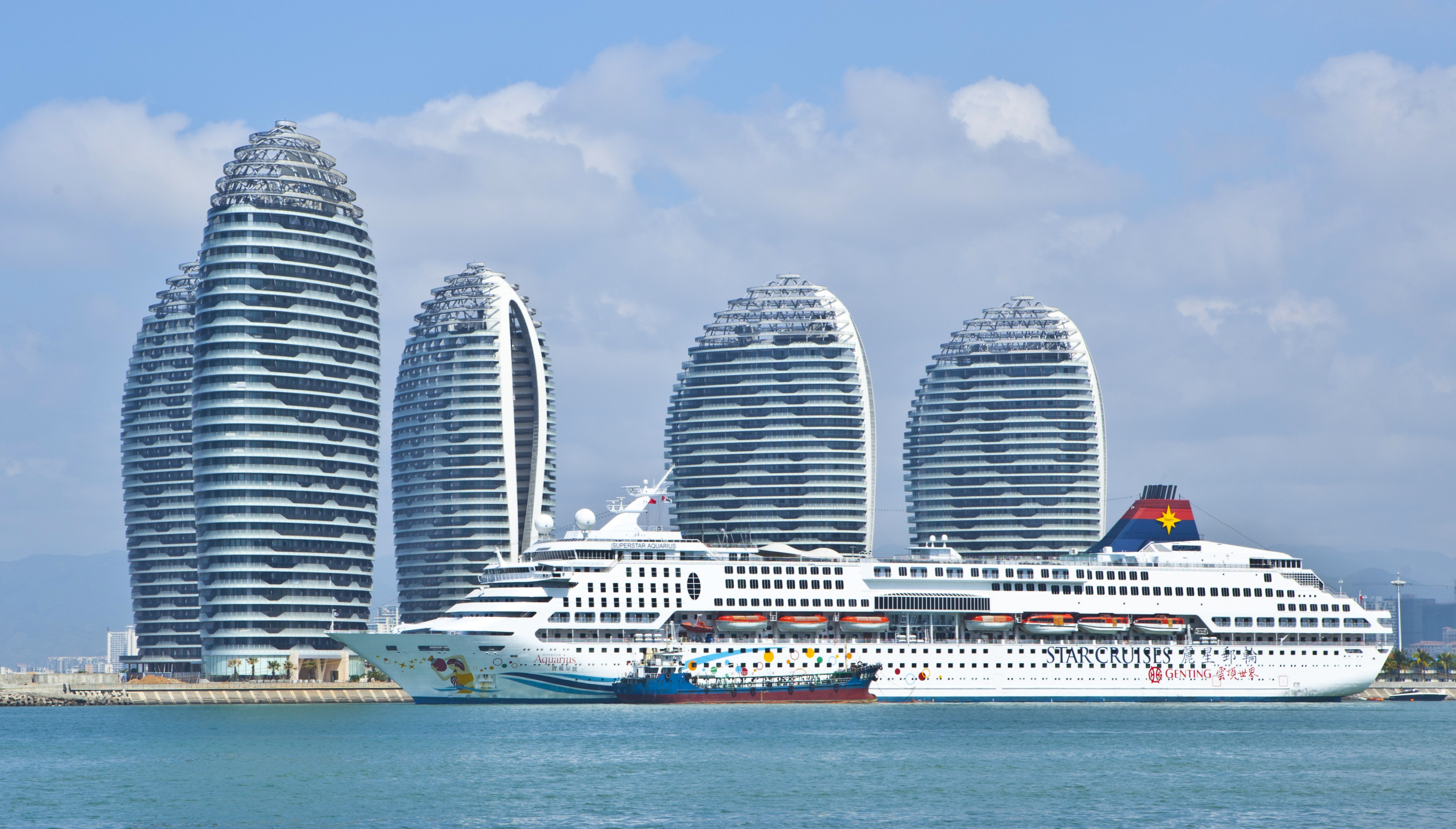
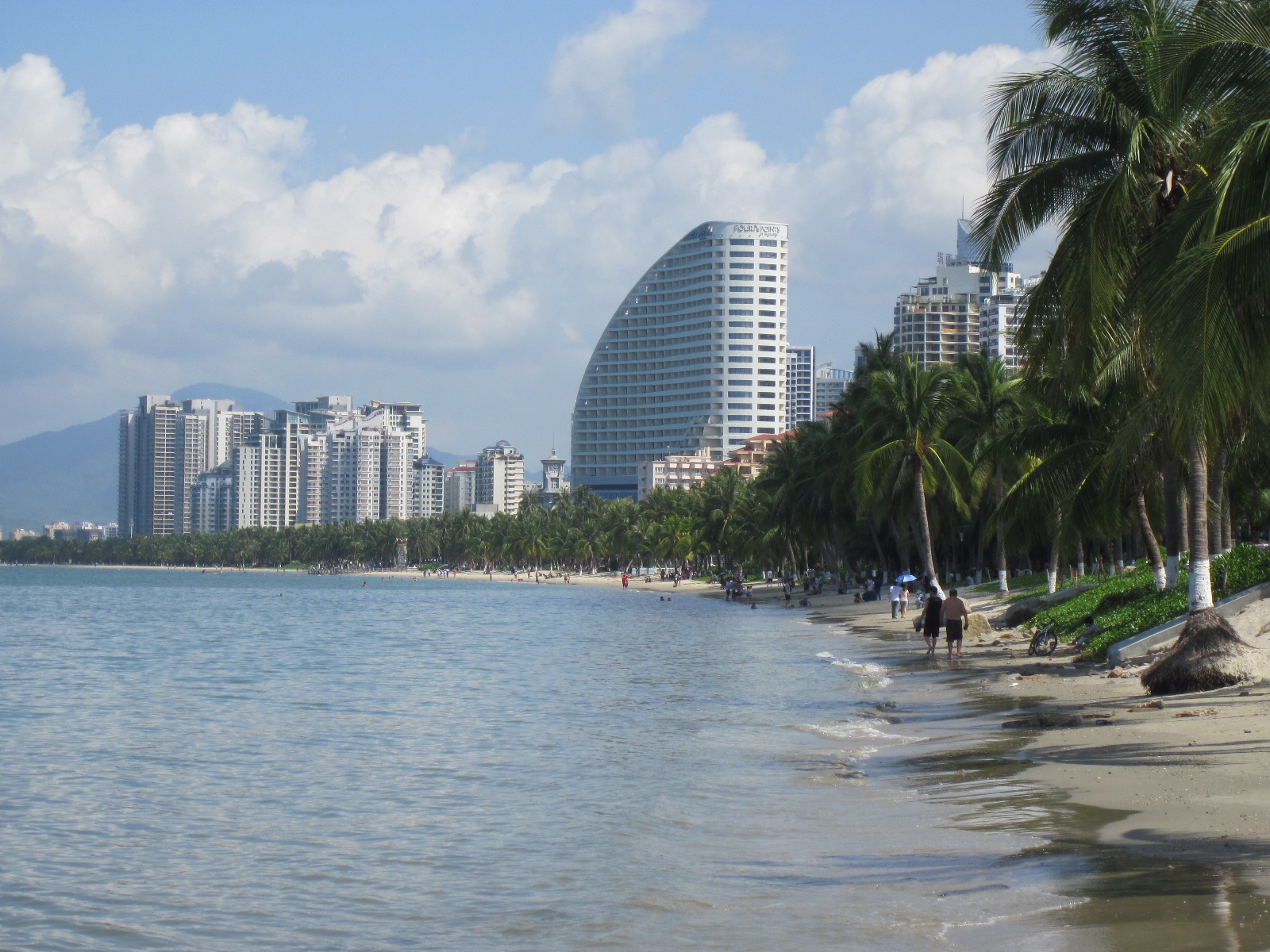
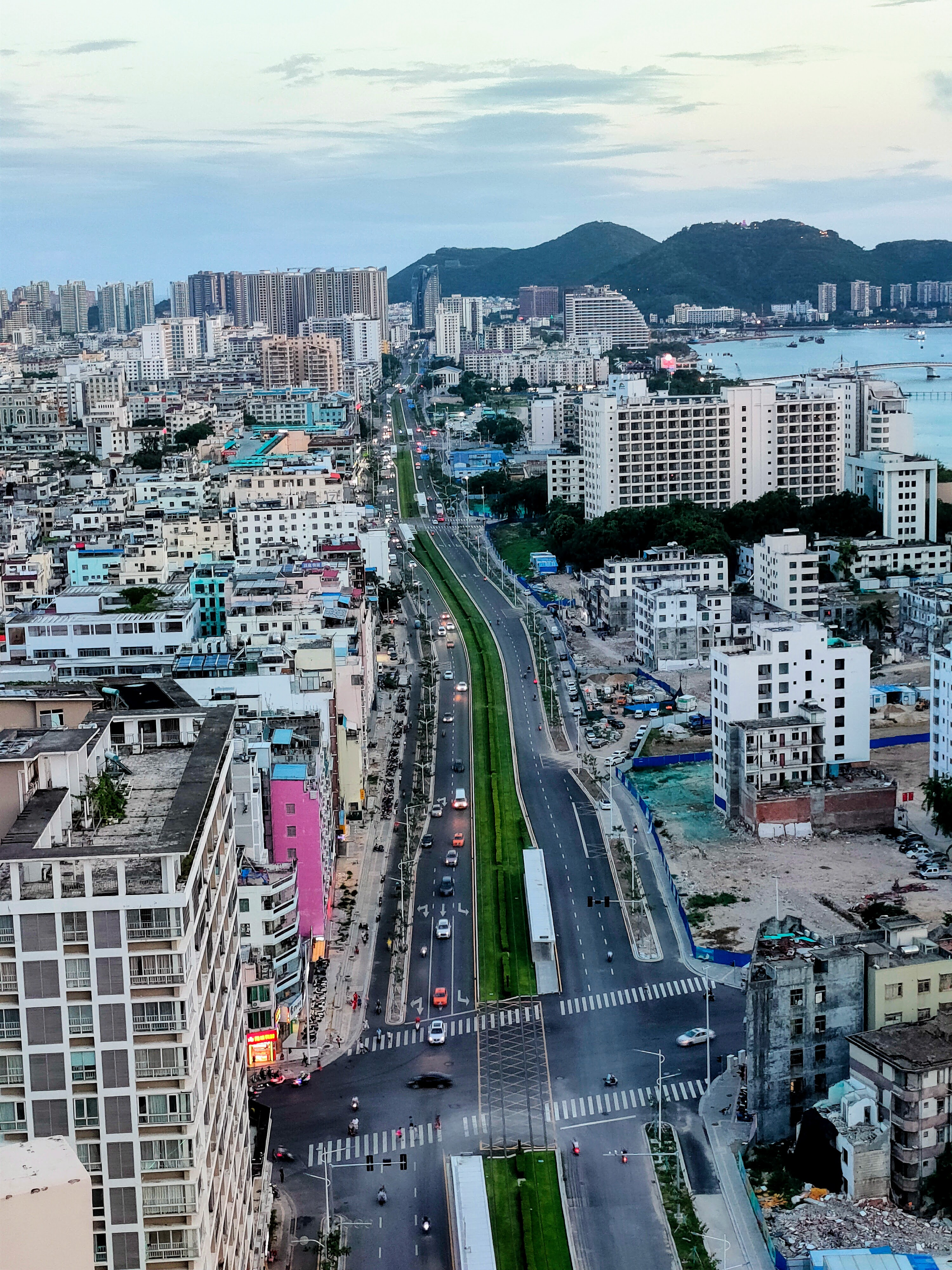
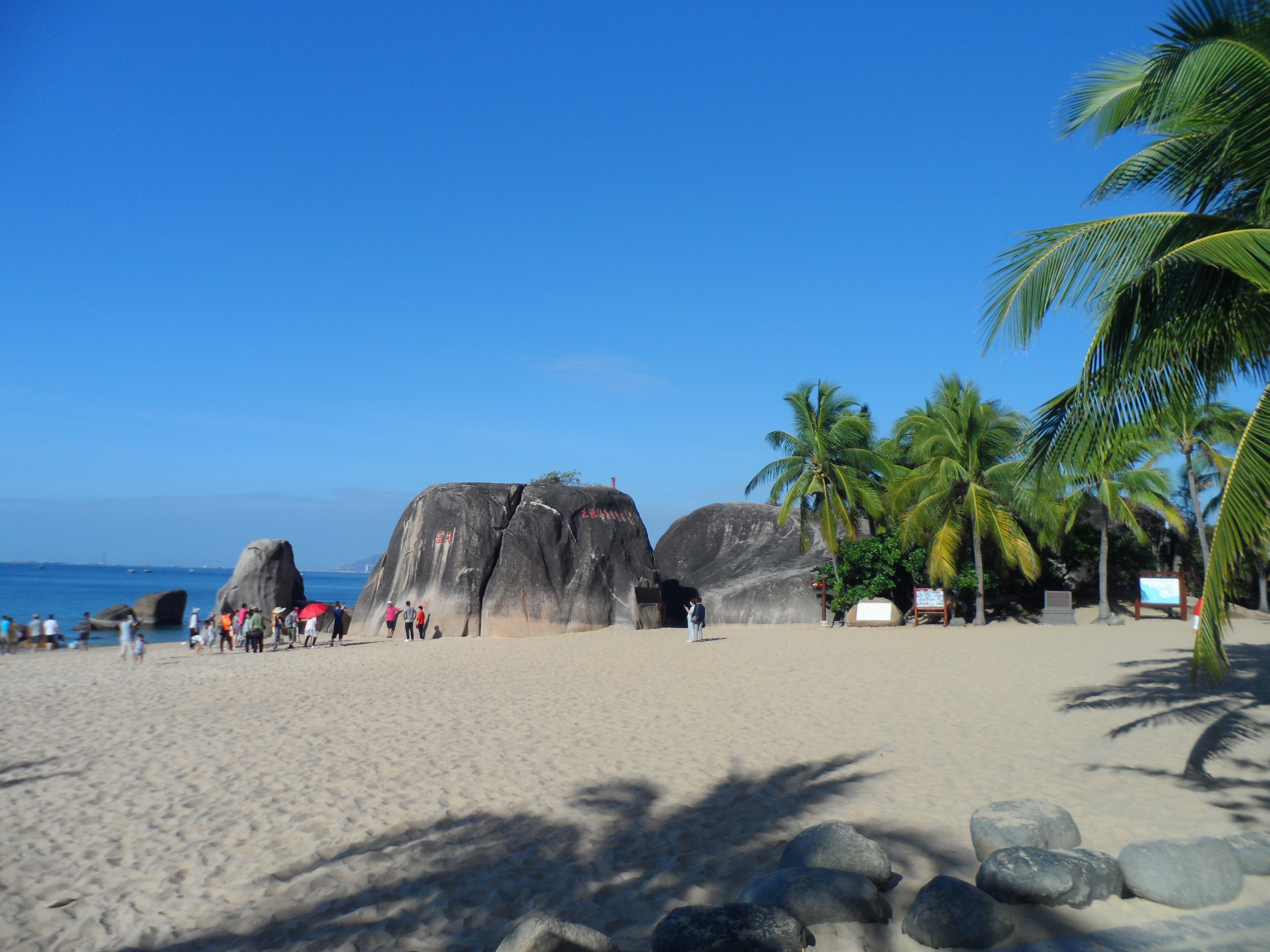
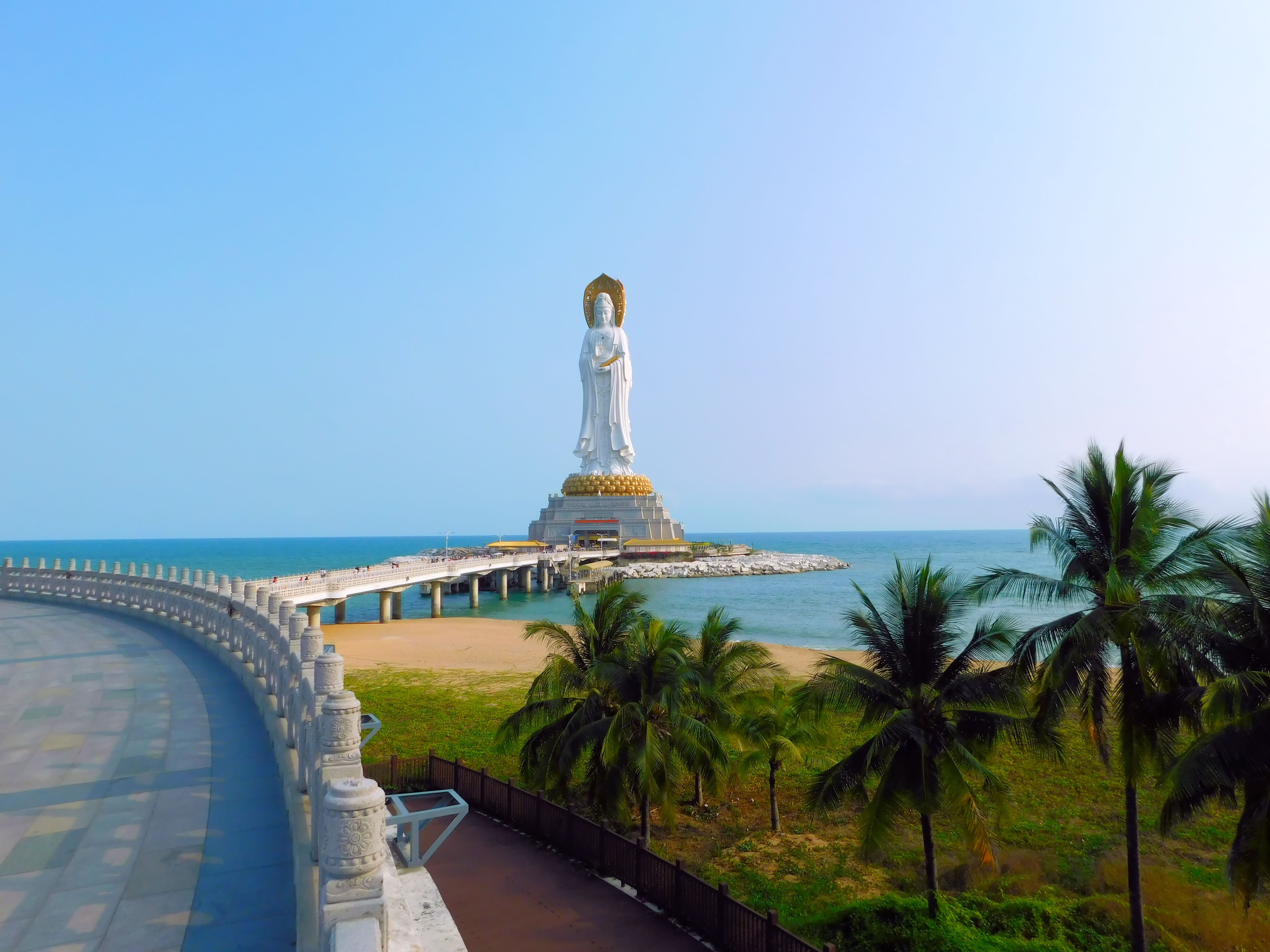
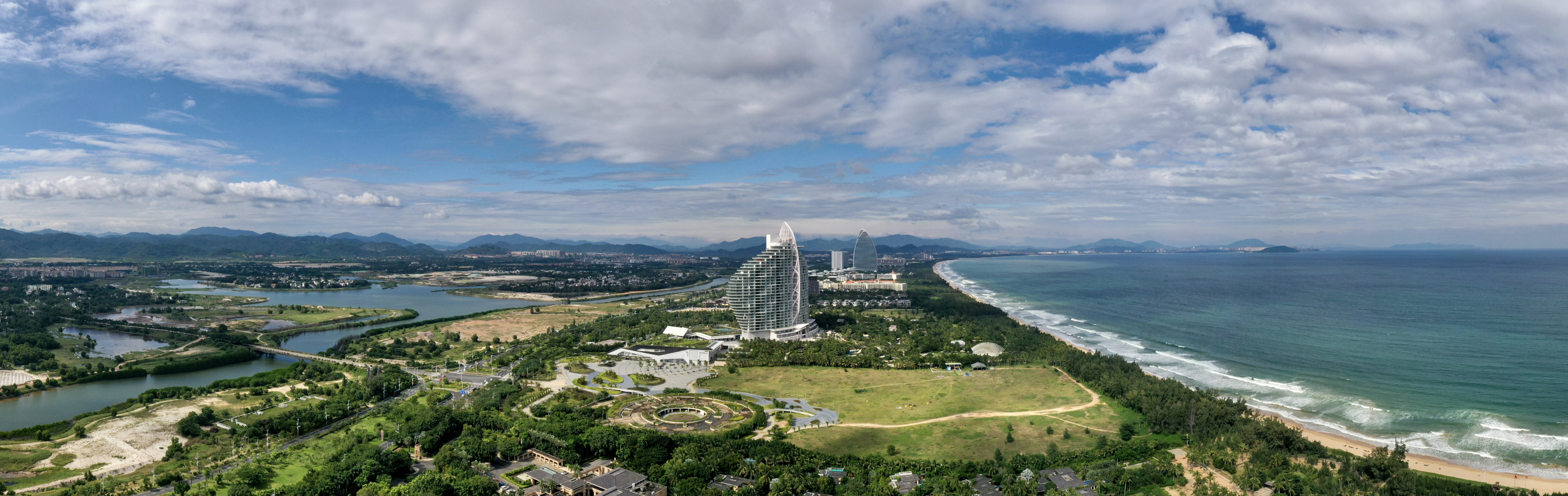
- Phoenix Island Sanya Bay Old City Tianya Haijiao Guanyin of Nanshan Haitang Bay

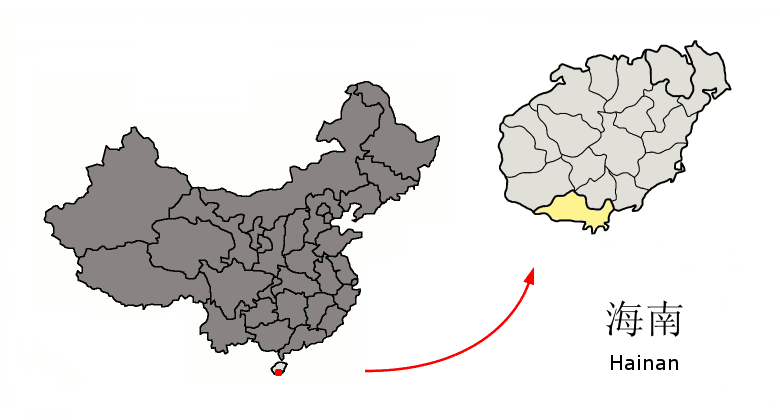
- Location of Sanya City jurisdiction in Hainan
- Interactive map of Sanya
- Coordinates (Sanya municipal government): 18°15′12″N 109°30′13″E
- Country: China
- Province: Hainan

Government
  - CPC Municipal Secretary: Jiang Sixian

Area
  - Prefecture-level city: 1,919.58 km^{2} (741.15 sq mi)
  - Urban: 1,919.58 km^{2} (741.15 sq mi)
  - Metro: 1,315.3 km^{2} (507.8 sq mi)

Population (2024 census)
  - Prefecture-level city: 1,116,100
  - Density: 581.43/km^{2} (1,505.9/sq mi)
  - Urban: 1,116,100
  - Urban density: 581.43/km^{2} (1,505.9/sq mi)
  - Metro: 818,000
  - Metro density: 622/km^{2} (1,610/sq mi)

GDP
  - Prefecture-level city: CN¥ 83.5 billion US$ 12.9 billion
  - Per capita: CN¥ 79,100; US$ 12,261
- Time zone: UTC+8 (China Standard)
- Postal code: 572100
- Area code: 0898
- ISO 3166 code: CN-HI-02
- Licence plate prefixes: 琼B
- Website: sanya.gov.cn

Sanya
- "Sanya" in Simplified (top) and Traditional (bottom) Chinese characters
- Simplified Chinese: 三亚
- Traditional Chinese: 三亞
- Postal: Samah
- Literal meaning: Third below the second
Transcriptions
Standard Mandarin
- Hanyu Pinyin: Sānyà
- Wade–Giles: San^{1}-ya^{4}
- IPA: [sán.jâ]
Yue: Cantonese
- Yale Romanization: Sāam-aa
- Jyutping: Saam^{1}-aa^{3}
- IPA: [sam˥ a˧]
Southern Min
- Hainanese Romanization: Tâ-ⁿa

Sanya (Note: Chinese: 三亚; also spelled Samah (Sam-ah).) is a resort city and the southernmost city on Hainan Island, and one of the four prefecture-level cities of Hainan Province in South China. It is a major tourist destination with several large scale resorts and contains the Sanya coral reef, a national protected nature reserve spanning 4000 hectares. Phoenix Island, an artificial island with a seven-star resort (one of the few in the world) and a complex of five-star hotels, is in Sanya Bay. The Guanyin of Nanshan, a Buddhist statue of Guanyin, is the thirteenth tallest statue in the world and is located in Sanya.

Until the end of 2024, the total population of Sanya was 1,116,100 inhabitants, living in an area of 1,919.58 km^{2} (741.15 sq mi). Its built-up (or metro) area was home to 818,000 inhabitants as of 2024.

The city is renowned for its tropical climate and has emerged as a popular tourist destination, also serving as the training site of the Chinese national beach volleyball team. Sanya is home to small concentrations of Utsul people (The name 'Huíhuī' is their pronunciation in spoken Chinese. As they have not yet received official recognition as a distinct ethnic group, they are administratively classified as part of the Hui nationality in China). Sanya is also the location of Yulin Naval Base, a major military facility on the South China Sea which is home to the People's Liberation Army Navy ballistic nuclear missile fleet.

== History ==
Known in ancient times as Yazhou, postal romanization: Aichow (崖州), literally "cliff state or prefecture", Sanya's history dates to the Qin dynasty (221–206 BCE). Due to its remoteness from the political centers during the Qin dynasty, Sanya was sometimes called Tianya Haijiao (天涯海角), meaning "the end of the sky and ocean" or "the end of the earth". As a result, the city served as a place of exile for officials who found themselves out of favor with the country's rulers.

During the Tang dynasty, a Buddhist monk accidentally landed here, using the site as a staging post on his missionary journey to Japan.

=== 20th century ===
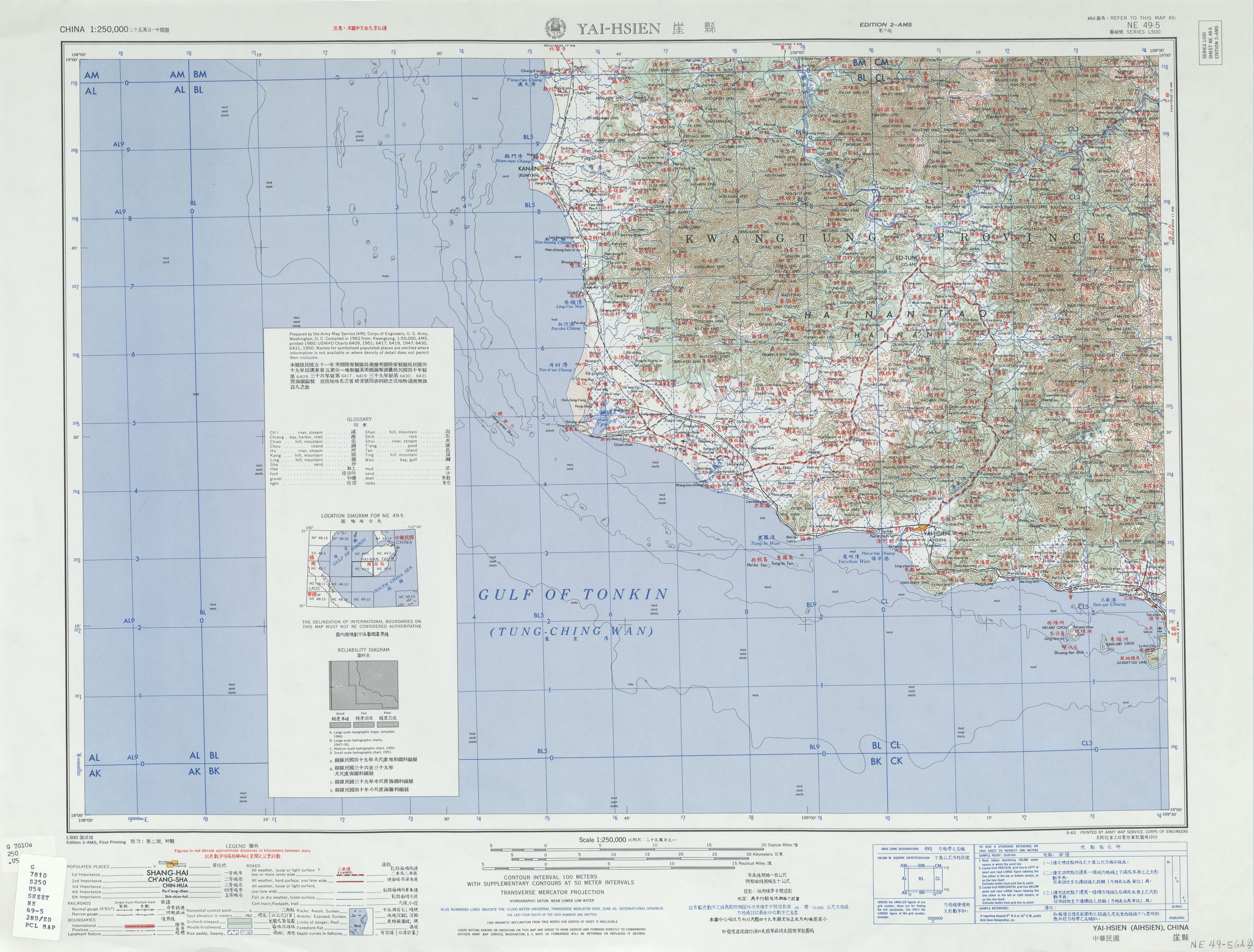
1962 map of Sanya

In 1912, Yazhou became Yaxian (Yai-hsien) (崖县; postal: Aihsien).

In 1958, administration of Yaxian relocated from Yacheng to Sanya and Yaxian merged with Baoting, Lingshui, Niulou, and Xinglong, Wanning, to become a large county. In 1959 and 1961, these areas were separated to establish Baoting and Lingshui while Yaxian County remained in its current prefecture. In 1987, approved by the State Council of China, Yaxian was established as a city named Sanya on 26 September 1987 and the city was officially established on 30 December 1987.

=== 21st century ===
In 2007, the Beijing Olympic Organizing Committee announced that the city of Sanya would become the first leg of the 2008 Summer Olympics torch relay in China.

== Geography ==
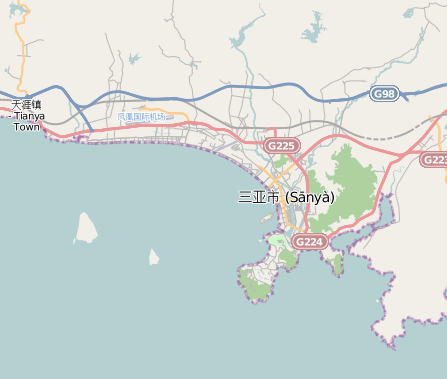
Sanya city map

Sanya lies at the southern tip of Hainan Island on Sanya Bay. Located at 18° 15' N latitude, Sanya is–after Sansha (also administered by Hainan Province)–the second-southernmost prefecture-level city nationally. Though the administrative area (Sanya City) has a rough topography, the city itself is generally flat, lying on a parcel of land between low-level mountains to the north and the South China Sea.

The city is one of the many coastal cities in China most at risk due to rapidly rising sea levels.

=== Climate ===
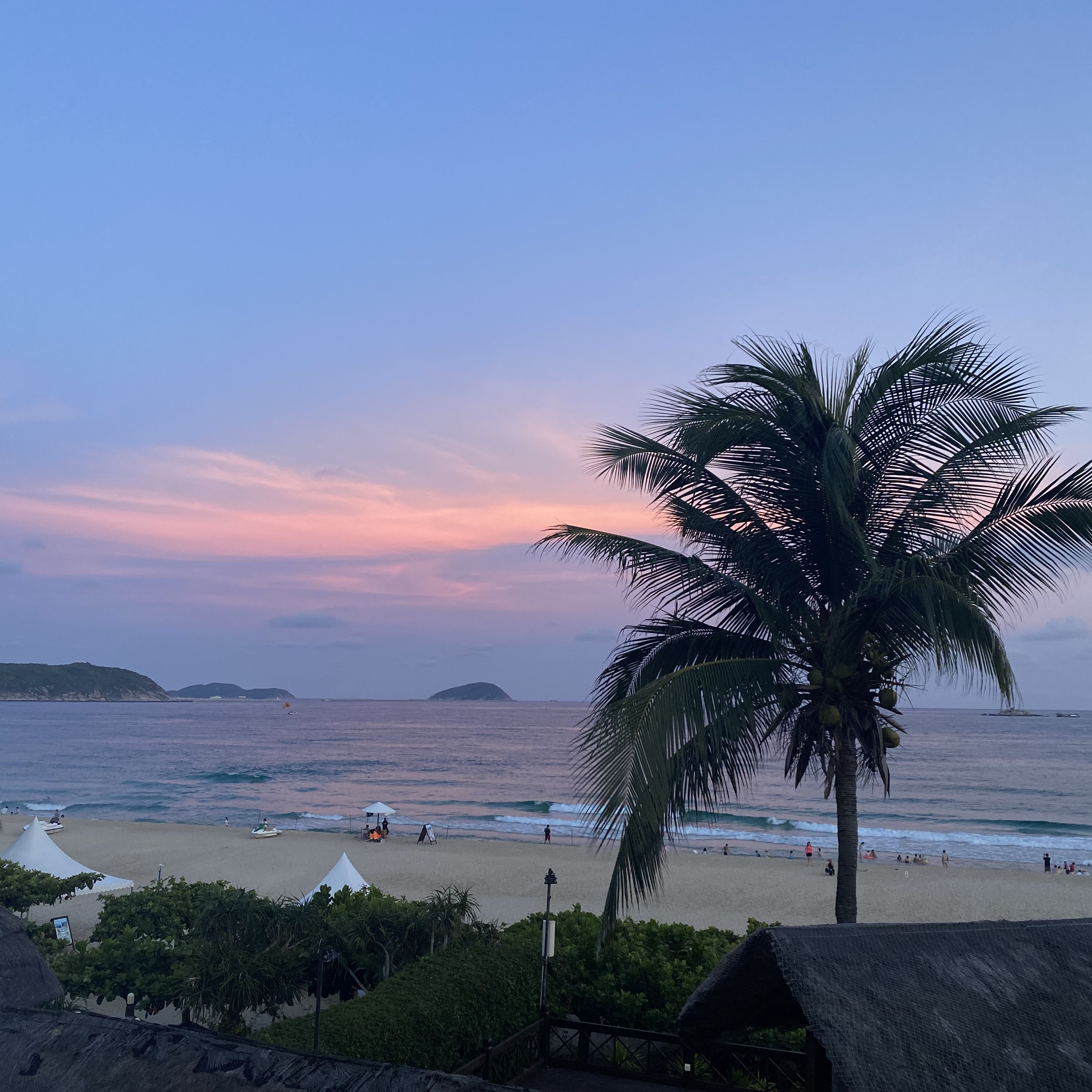
A beach in Sanya

The area has a tropical wet and dry climate (Köppen Aw), featuring hot weather all year around. Monsoonal influences are strong, with a relatively lengthy wet season and a pronounced dry season. The average annual temperature in the Sanya is 26.5 °C (79.7 °F). The coolest month is January, with an average temperature of 22.3 °C (72.1 °F), while the hottest, unlike much of the rest of China, is June, with an average temperature of 29.5 °C (85.1 °F). The average annual high temperature is 30.2 °C (86.4 °F). Water temperatures remain above 22 °C (72 °F) year-round.

Since meteorological records began, the average annual temperature in Sanya has warmed in fluctuations. Taking 2024 as an example, the average annual temperature in Sanya is 27.3 °C (81.1 °F), 0.8 °C higher than the average from 1991 to 2020. The average annual high temperature in 2024 is 31.3 °C (88.3 °F), and the average annual low temperature is 24.8 °C (76.6 °F).

From 2016 to 2025, the average temperature in Sanya is 27.0 °C (80.6 °F).

Climate data for Sanya, elevation 6 m (20 ft), (1991–2020 normals, extremes 1951–present)
Month	Jan	Feb	Mar	Apr	May	Jun	Jul	Aug	Sep	Oct	Nov	Dec	Year
Record high °C (°F)	31.2 (88.2)	32.2 (90.0)	34.5 (94.1)	35.8 (96.4)	37.5 (99.5)	36.7 (98.1)	37.1 (98.8)	37.0 (98.6)	35.9 (96.6)	35.0 (95.0)	34.0 (93.2)	33.0 (91.4)	37.5 (99.5)
Mean daily maximum °C (°F)	26.6 (79.9)	27.3 (81.1)	29.1 (84.4)	31.1 (88.0)	32.4 (90.3)	32.5 (90.5)	32.0 (89.6)	31.9 (89.4)	31.7 (89.1)	30.9 (87.6)	29.6 (85.3)	27.3 (81.1)	30.2 (86.4)
Daily mean °C (°F)	22.3 (72.1)	23.1 (73.6)	25.2 (77.4)	27.4 (81.3)	29.1 (84.4)	29.5 (85.1)	28.9 (84.0)	28.6 (83.5)	28.0 (82.4)	27.0 (80.6)	25.4 (77.7)	23.1 (73.6)	26.5 (79.6)
Mean daily minimum °C (°F)	19.6 (67.3)	20.6 (69.1)	22.8 (73.0)	25.0 (77.0)	26.5 (79.7)	26.5 (79.7)	26.9 (80.4)	26.2 (79.2)	25.4 (77.7)	24.2 (75.6)	22.7 (72.9)	20.4 (68.7)	23.9 (75.0)
Record low °C (°F)	5.1 (41.2)	8.9 (48.0)	10.5 (50.9)	15.5 (59.9)	19.8 (67.6)	21.3 (70.3)	22.0 (71.6)	21.8 (71.2)	18.8 (65.8)	14.7 (58.5)	7.9 (46.2)	7.1 (44.8)	5.1 (41.2)
Average precipitation mm (inches)	6.2 (0.24)	13.5 (0.53)	20.9 (0.82)	50.7 (2.00)	131.0 (5.16)	181.7 (7.15)	211.7 (8.33)	227.1 (8.94)	248.5 (9.78)	235.9 (9.29)	74.3 (2.93)	16.0 (0.63)	1,417.5 (55.8)
Average precipitation days (≥ 0.1 mm)	3.4	3.6	3.9	5.6	10.0	14.0	13.8	16.0	17.0	13.5	6.6	3.7	111.1
Average relative humidity (%)	77	80	82	83	83	84	85	85	84	79	77	74	81
Mean monthly sunshine hours	188.1	151.8	180.7	207.8	242.7	215.8	241.7	224.7	198.0	205.7	191.1	177.0	2,425.1
Average ultraviolet index	9	11	12	12	12	12	12	12	12	10	9	8	11
Source 1: China Meteorological Administration (precipitation and sun 1981–2008)
Source 2: Weather China (precipitation days 1971–2000)NOAA Weather Atlas

Climate data for Sanya, elevation 6 m (20 ft), (2016–2025 normals)
Month	Jan	Feb	Mar	Apr	May	Jun	Jul	Aug	Sep	Oct	Nov	Dec	Year
Mean daily maximum °C (°F)	27.4 (81.3)	28.0 (82.4)	30.0 (86.0)	31.7 (89.1)	33.6 (92.5)	33.8 (92.8)	33.2 (91.8)	32.9 (91.2)	32.9 (91.2)	31.2 (88.2)	30.4 (86.7)	28.0 (82.4)	31.1 (88.0)
Daily mean °C (°F)	23.0 (73.4)	23.3 (73.9)	25.6 (78.1)	27.6 (81.7)	29.7 (85.5)	30.0 (86.0)	29.5 (85.1)	29.2 (84.6)	28.7 (83.7)	27.5 (81.5)	26.2 (79.2)	23.6 (74.5)	27.0 (80.6)
Mean daily minimum °C (°F)	20.3 (68.5)	20.7 (69.3)	23.2 (73.8)	25.2 (77.4)	27.0 (80.6)	27.5 (81.5)	27.1 (80.8)	26.8 (80.2)	26.0 (78.8)	24.7 (76.5)	23.3 (73.9)	20.9 (69.6)	24.4 (75.9)
Source: China Meteorological Administration

== Subdivisions ==
Before 30 July 2014, there was direct jurisdiction over four county-level districts and two township-level subdistricts (乡级管理区; xiāngjí guǎnlǐqū), six towns (镇; zhèn) and four state-run farms in Sanya City. Now there are four districts in Sanya.

Map
District	Simplified Chinese	Hanyu Pinyin	Population (2010 census)	Area (km^{2})	Density (/km^{2})
Jiyang	吉阳区	Jíyáng Qū	257,061	372	691.02
Tianya	天涯区	Tiānyá Qū	269,935	944	285.94
Haitang	海棠区	Hǎitáng Qū	76,562	255	300.24
Yazhou	崖州区	Yázhōu Qū	160,000	347	460.10

== Tourism ==
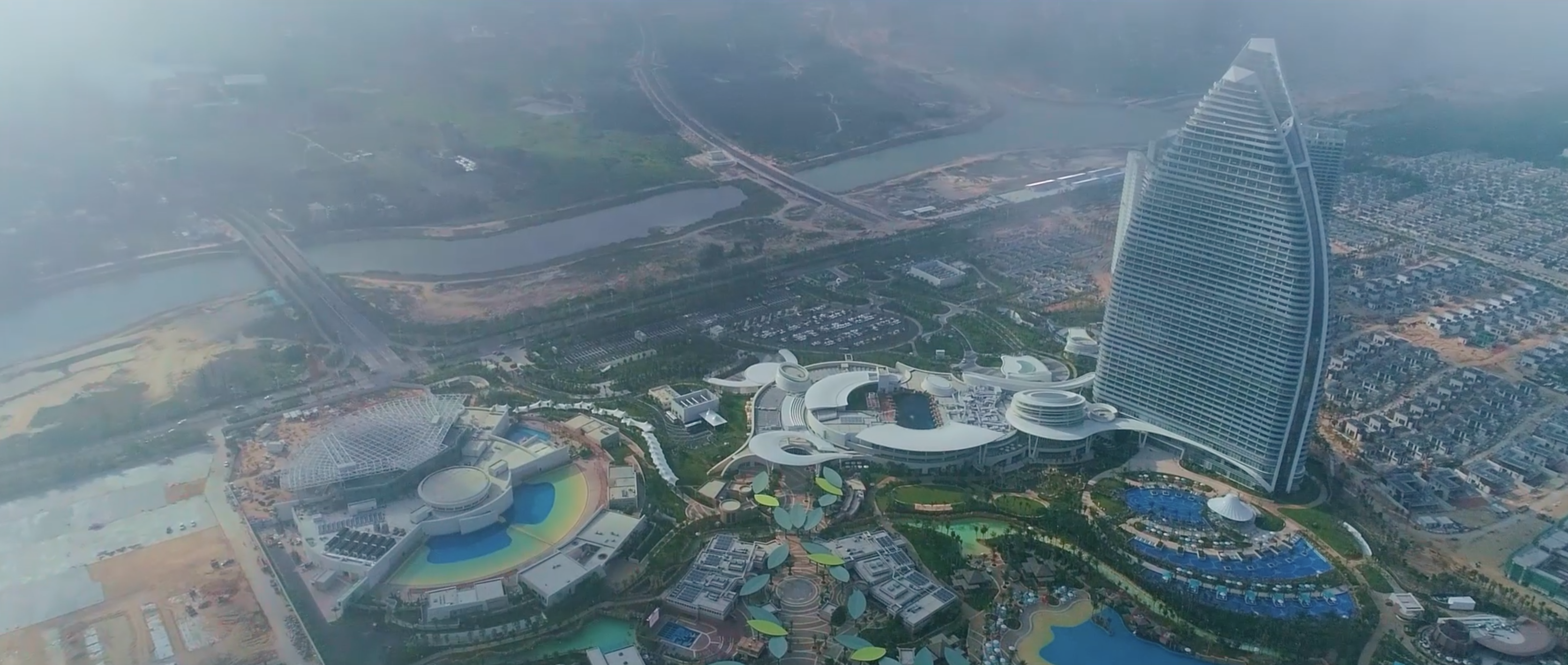
Atlantis Sanya is one of multiple resorts located in Sanya

In recent years Sanya has become a popular tourist destination. Numerous international five star luxury hotel and resort chains are now established in the area. In 2009, the luxury Mandarin Oriental, Sanya hotel opened in the Dadong Hai area, the first Mandarin Oriental property on Hainan Island. Atlantis Sanya opened in 2018, becoming the first Atlantis branded hotel in China. There are now over 100 hotels, ranging from international brands to locally managed resorts.

Russian and English signs can be seen throughout the city. In response to claims of over-charging of tourists (whether foreign or Chinese) at restaurants in the city, Hainan government officials and Sanya city officials have vowed to crack down on the practice. The Sanya Industrial and Commercial Bureau has implemented a real-time information system of the city's seafood restaurants during the May Day holiday for public supervision in order to stop any future price gouging by restaurants.

Sanya also hosts the Guanyin of Nanshan, that is located within the Nanshan Temple (Sanya).

Nature reserves of Yalong Bay Tropical Paradise Forest Park (亚龙湾热带 天堂森林公园) and Sanya Coral Reef National Nature Reserve (三亚珊瑚礁国家级自然保护区) are located nearby Yalong Bay, and Yalong Bay National Tourism Holiday Resort was created. In recent years, as the waters of Sanya Bay and others below mentioned are becoming clearer and healthier, several species of dolphins, including endangered Chinese white dolphins, appear along the coasts from time to time. However, they have not been considered as targeted tourism attractions.

== Transportation ==
The city is served by Sanya Phoenix International Airport. A second airport, Sanya Hongtangwan International Airport has been planned; however, construction has been halted by environmental concerns since 2020. Taxis are available throughout the city.

Buses from other parts of Hainan serve Sanya's bus terminal. The No. 8 bus connects the airport to Dadonghai Beach. From there tourists can take the 24 or 25 bus to Yalong Bay or the 28 bus to Haitang Bay. There is also a free bus from Luhuitou Square to the Duty-Free Shopping Center at Haitang Bay, the largest such center in China.

=== Hainan East Ring Intercity Rail ===
The Hainan East Ring Intercity Rail links Sanya and Haikou and runs along the east coast of Hainan Island. There are 15 stations in between, either in operation or still under construction. Trains are designed to travel at 250 km/h (160 mph). Travel time from Sanya to Haikou is approximately 1 hour and 22 minutes. The Hainan Western Ring High-Speed Railway, running along the west coast of the province also links Sanya to Haikou.

=== Tram ===
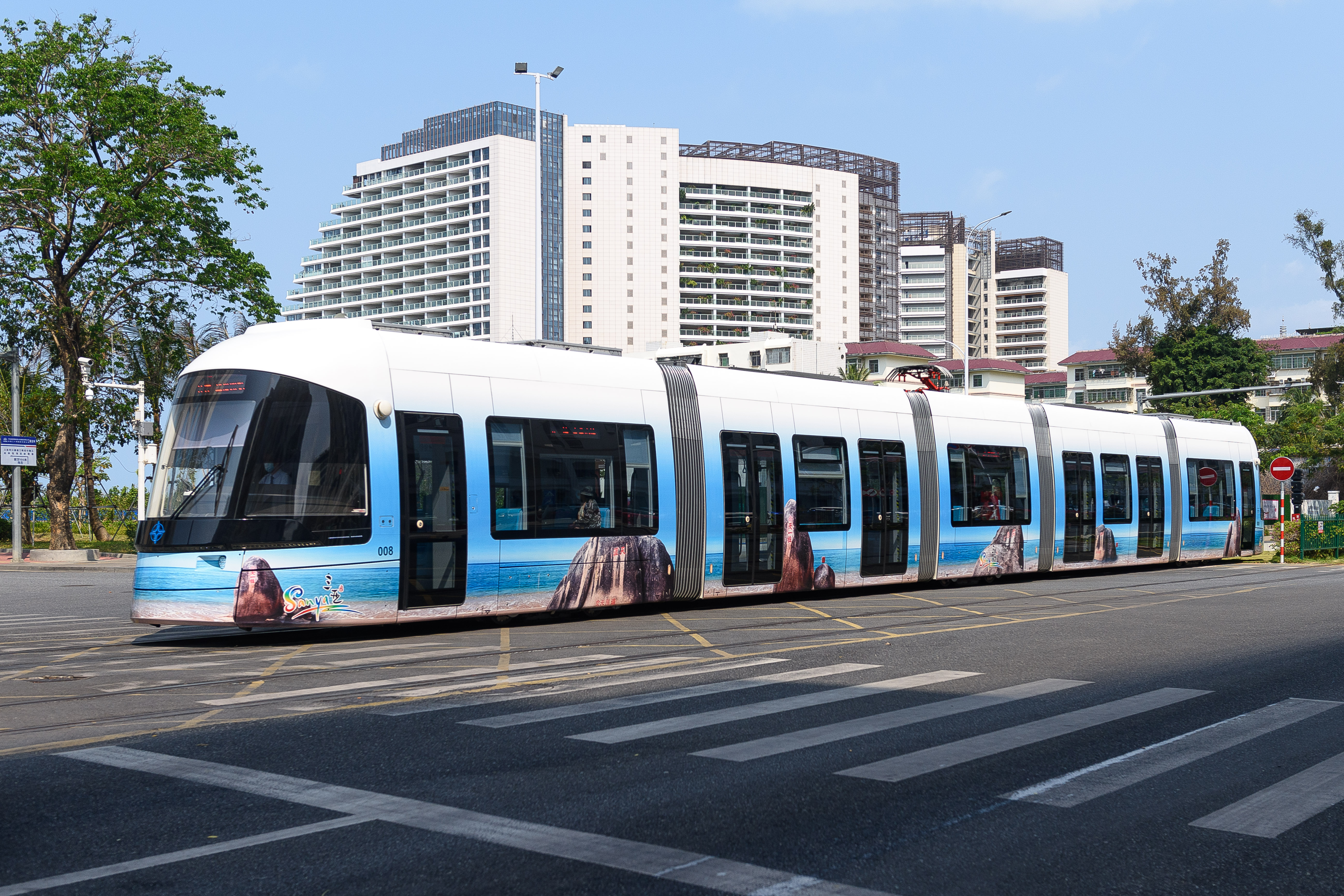
A tram approaching to Jiangang Road station

Sanya's tram service began trial operation on 7 January 2019. Trams are composed of five carriages with a maximum seating capacity of 362 people. In built up and urbanised areas, the maximum speed of the tram is 50 km/h. The current tram route begins at Sanya Railway Station and finishes at Jiangang Road Station, which is currently the southernmost railway station in China. Full operation of the first line started on 10 October 2020.

== Economics & social services ==
=== Hospitals ===
There are a total of 54 hospitals in Sanya as of March 2019, both public hospitals funded by the state and private hospitals. There are also numerous clinics for doing annual health-checks, which are usually brands of national chains in China.

Hainan 301 Hospital, a branch hospital of People's Liberation Army General Hospital, is located in the Haitang Bay area of Sanya. The hospital possesses a substantial number of state-of-the-art equipment for medical and research purposes which include a Da Vinci surgical system, different MIR system (including 1.5T MRI 3.0T MRI), Helical CT facilities (including 128-Slices CT), medical linear accelerator and electronic microscopes which are worth more than 450 million yuan. The hospital has 500 patient beds, and a total of 74 clinical, medical and nursing departments.

Sanya Traditional Chinese Medicine Hospital (三亚市中医院) is located on Fenghuang Road. It is a grade-A tertiary hospital offering medical care, education, research, healthcare services and International Chinese Medicine exchange and cooperation.

=== Medical tourism ===
The Sanya area of Hainan offers a free trade port offering opportunities for overseas service providers to enter the local market, and it is actively developing its commercial health services industry to promote medical tourism. A pilot project was approved by the People's Republic of China State Council in 2013 called the Boao Lecheng International Medical Tourism Pilot Zone, also known by 2024 as Boao Hope City, as the only medical tourism special zone in China. Specialist medical services as well as specially licensed drugs are available in the zone. The importation of medical technologies and equipment, or drugs approved for marketing outside of China but not yet approved in China, may be used in the pilot zone with special approval of state authorities. The zone is likewise available for trials and testing. Lecheng received approximately 300,000 medical tourists in 2023, and also served some 28,000 persons who reside in the zone.

== Education ==
=== Colleges and universities ===
Sanya University (三亚学院) Located at Xueyuan Rd., Yingbin Ave. Sanya Hainan 572022. Sanya University is an independent undergraduate university. The university has fourteen schools: Social Development, Law, Finance and Economics, Management, Tourism Management, Humanities and Communication, Arts, Foreign Languages, Engineering, Physical Education, General Education & Foundation Courses, International Tourism, International Education and Music, and other, and offers 56 undergraduate majors.

Qiongzhou University (琼州大学) is located at 1 Yucai Road. The only public university located in Sanya, Qiongzhou is actively pursuing more foreign enrollments, hoping to attract Chinese tourism and language students to the city. Courses offered to international students are: elementary Chinese, intermediate Chinese, advanced Chinese (listening, speaking, reading and writing), English, Russian (listening, speaking, reading and writing), Chinese calligraphy and painting, Chinese martial arts, Chinese history, studies of Li and Miao Cultures, tourism and recreational management, and music performance.

=== Primary and secondary schools ===
The city government states on its website that "Being the second-largest city in Hainan, the education in Sanya is relatively better than the average level in Hainan Province" but that the kindergartens are not as good as those in major Chinese cities and that the primary and secondary schools are still below the Chinese national average.

According to the city government, Primary schools No.7 and No.9 are the best in the city and that Bayi Primary School "is also of good quality". The city government identifies the best lower secondary (junior high school) and upper secondary (senior high school) institutions as Sanya Shiyan Middle School and Sanya No.1 High School, respectively.

The International School of Sanya (formerly Canadian International School of Sanya) is the first school to offer two programs: Canadian and Mandarin, in Hainan. The school has announced its relocation to the BanShanBanDao -Serenity Coast (半山半岛) residential area in August 2014, where the new campus will offer pre-K. day students and boarding facilities for students.

== Events ==
The city has hosted:

- Boao Forum for Asia Annual high level forums for world leaders focused on the Asian region and its stakeholders.
- 2014 WTTC Global Summit Keynote speakers: Kofi Annan, Jeffrey Katzenberg, Dame DeAnne Julius, Yao Ming
- 2011–12 Volvo Ocean Race Leg 4 Start to Auckland
- 2011 BRICS summit
- Elite Model Look in 2008 and 2009
- Miss World contest in 2003, 2004, 2005, 2007, 2010, 2015, 2017 and 2018
- Mister World contest in 2007
- World's Strongest Man contest in 2006 and 2013
- 2012 Sanya International Beach Musical Festival
- 2013 ITF Women's Circuit – Sanya
- 2014–15 Volvo Ocean Race In-port race and Leg 4 Start to Auckland
- FIA Formula E Sanya ePrix from 2019
- 2026 Asian Beach Games

== Sister cities ==
Country	City	Date
United States	Alhambra, California	1994.10.05
Philippines	Lapu-Lapu	1997.07.19
France	Cannes	1997.11.17
South Korea	Seogwipo	2008.04.04
Mexico	Cancún	2010.08.10
Russia	Khabarovsk	2011.11.28
United Kingdom	Blackpool	2016.09.06
Malaysia	George Town, Penang	2017
Croatia	Dubrovnik	2013

== Gallery ==
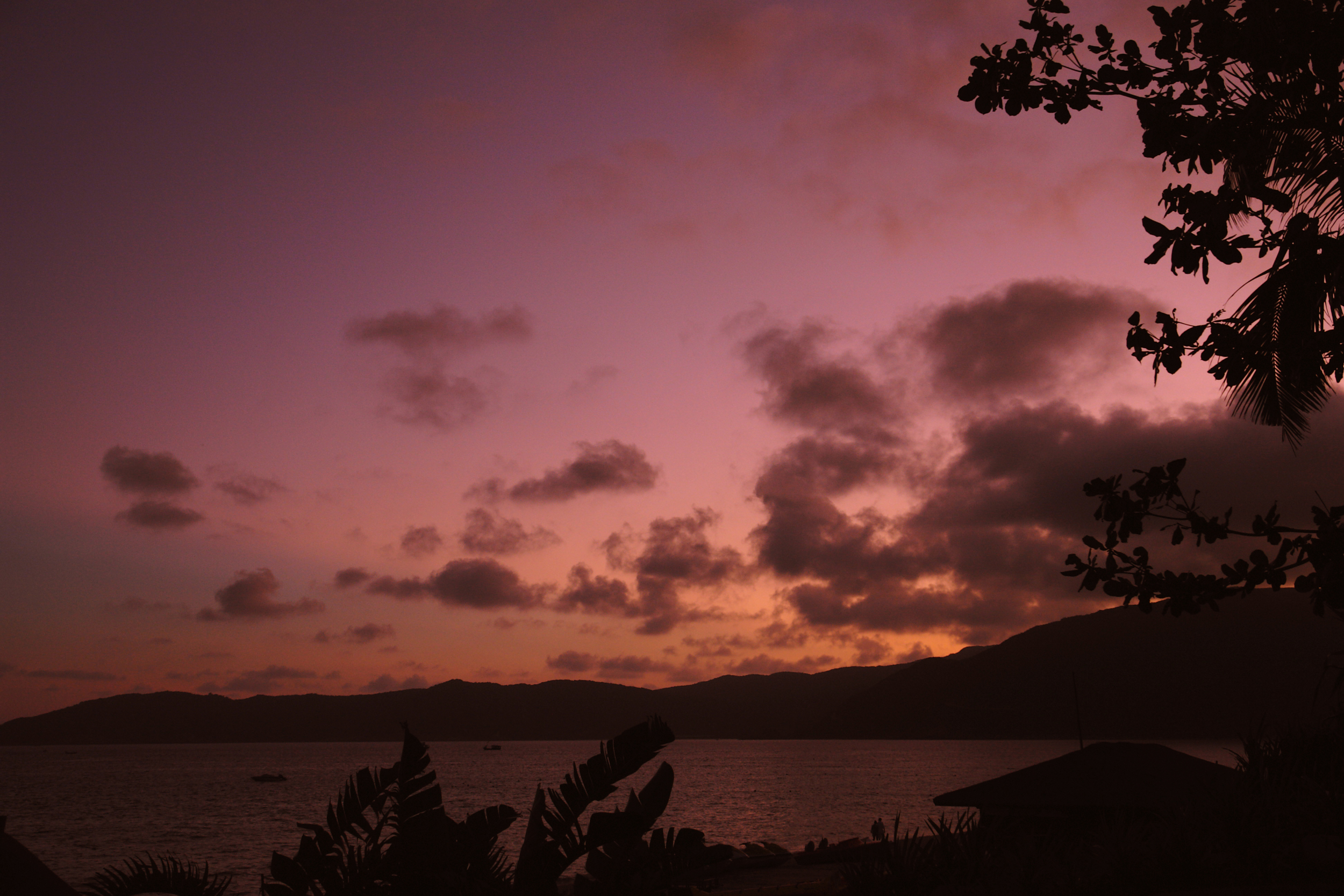
Sanya Sunset

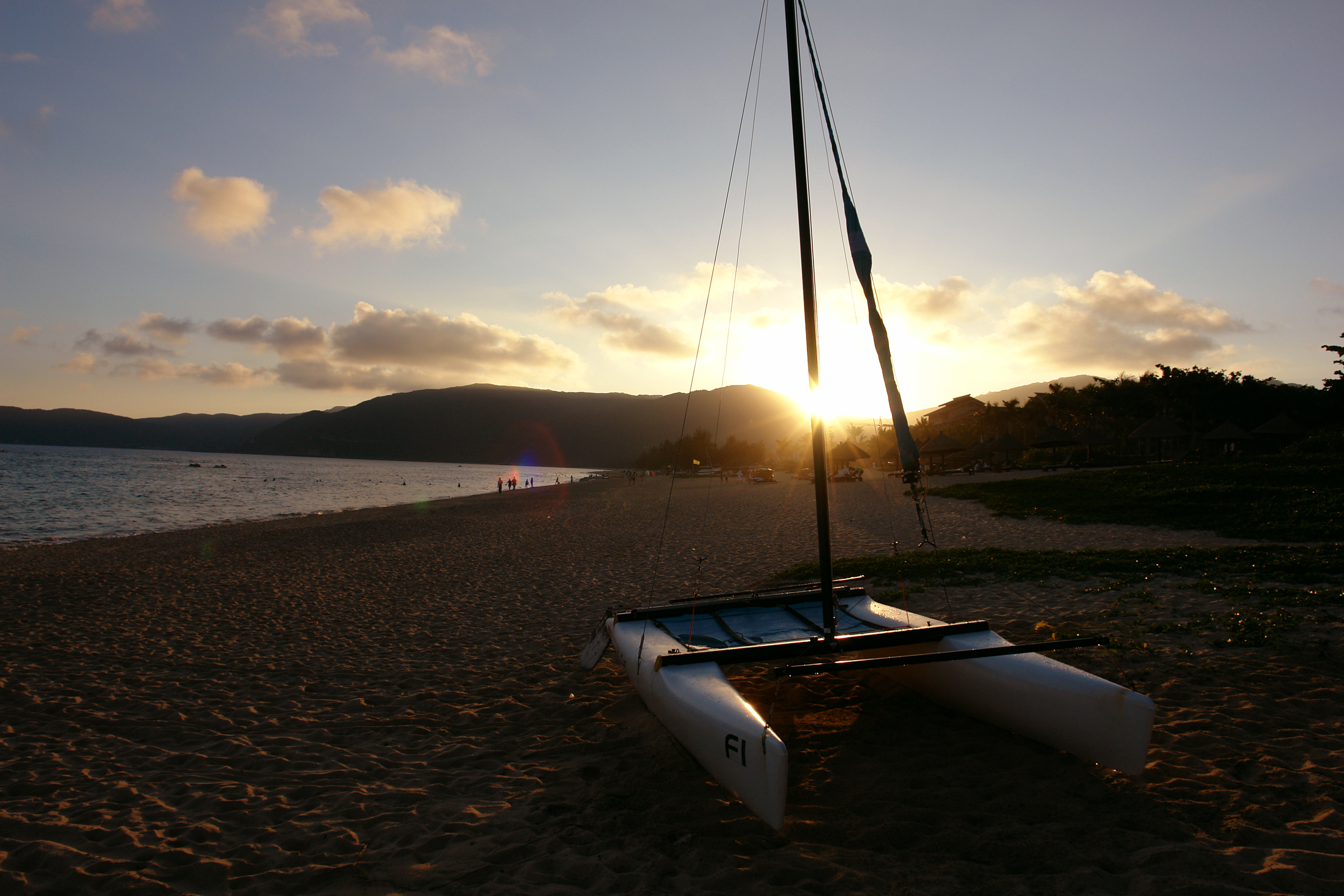
Setting Sun at Sanya Beach

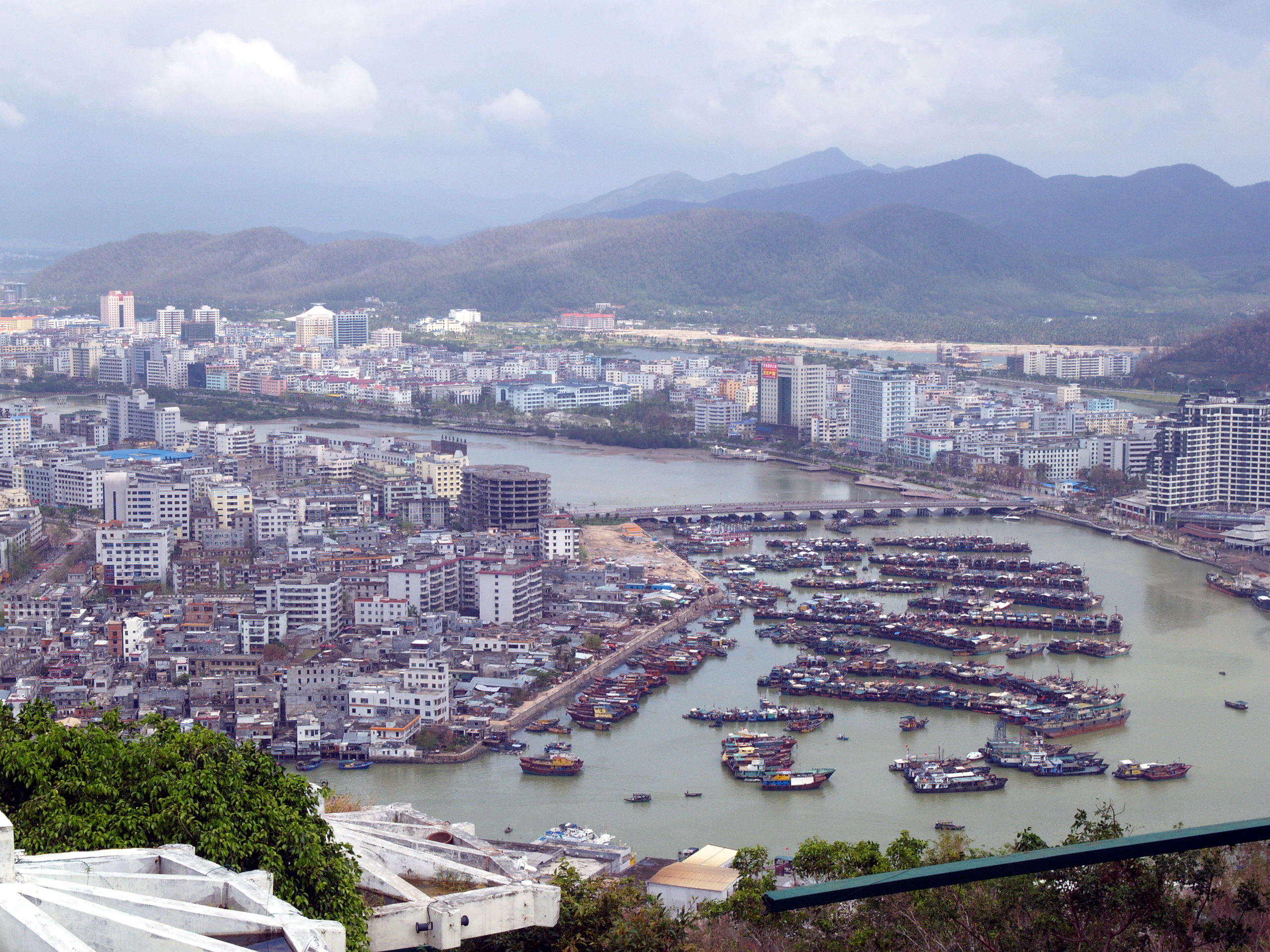
East part of Sanya

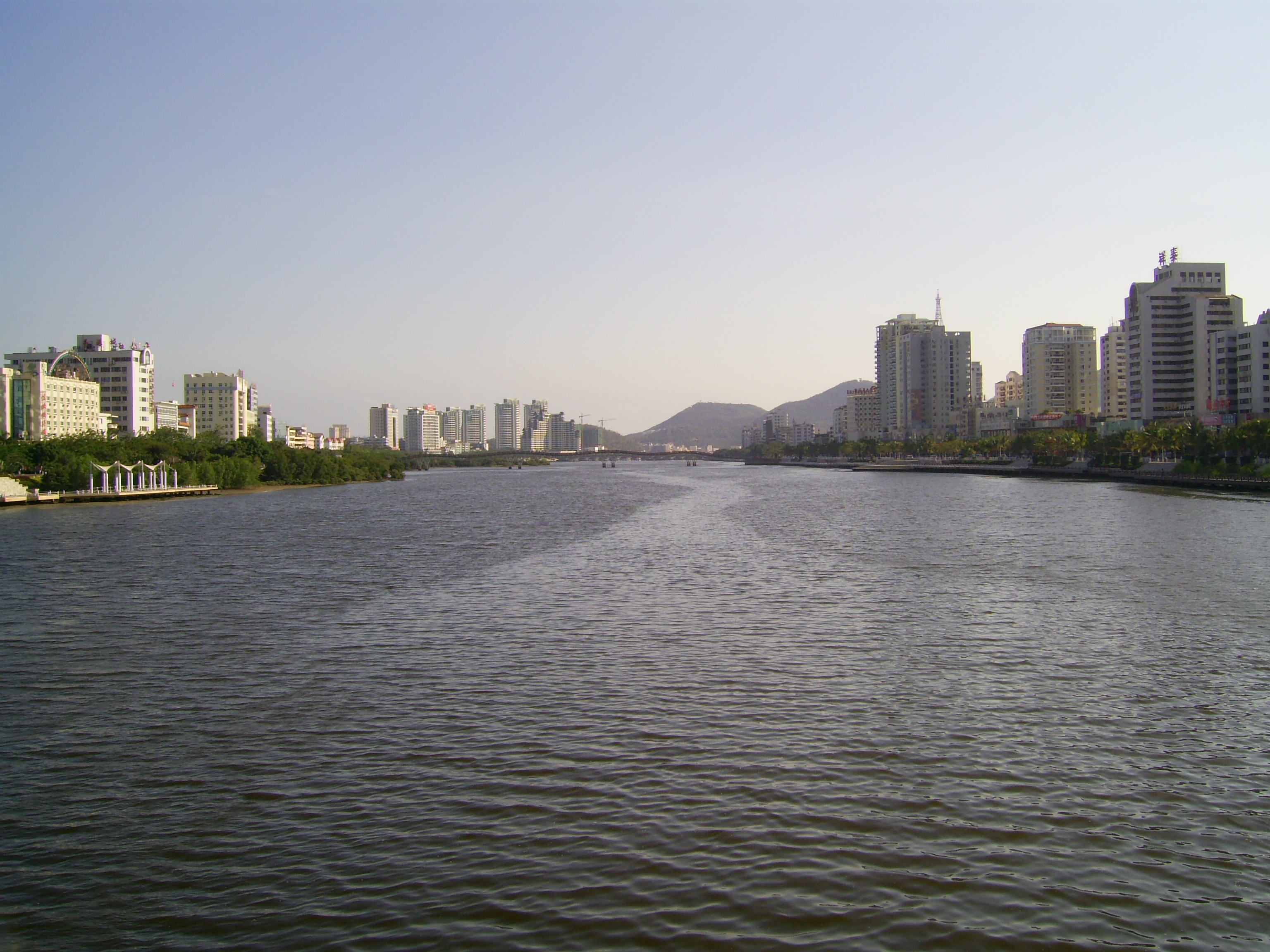
Sanya River

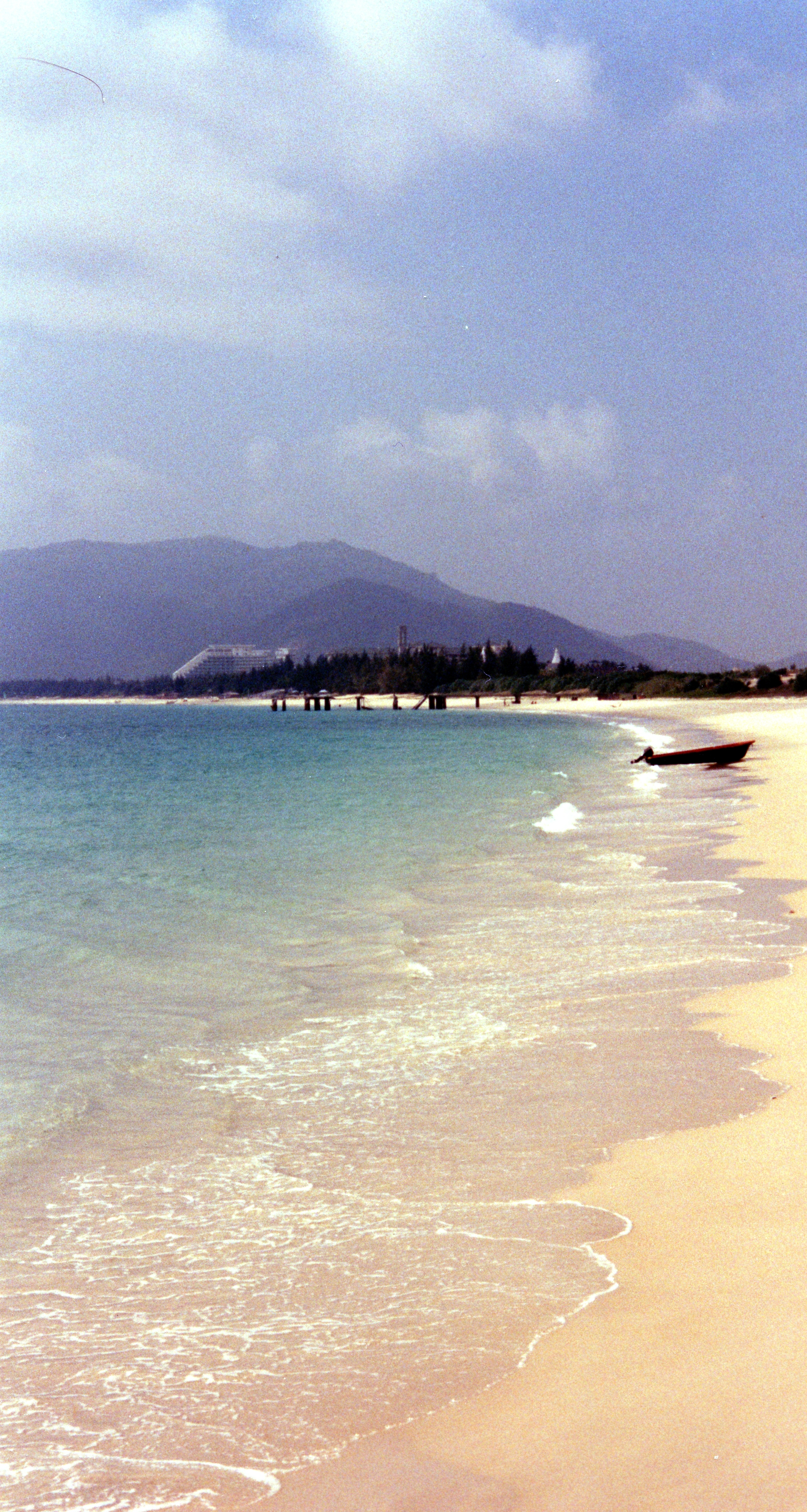
Beach Scene

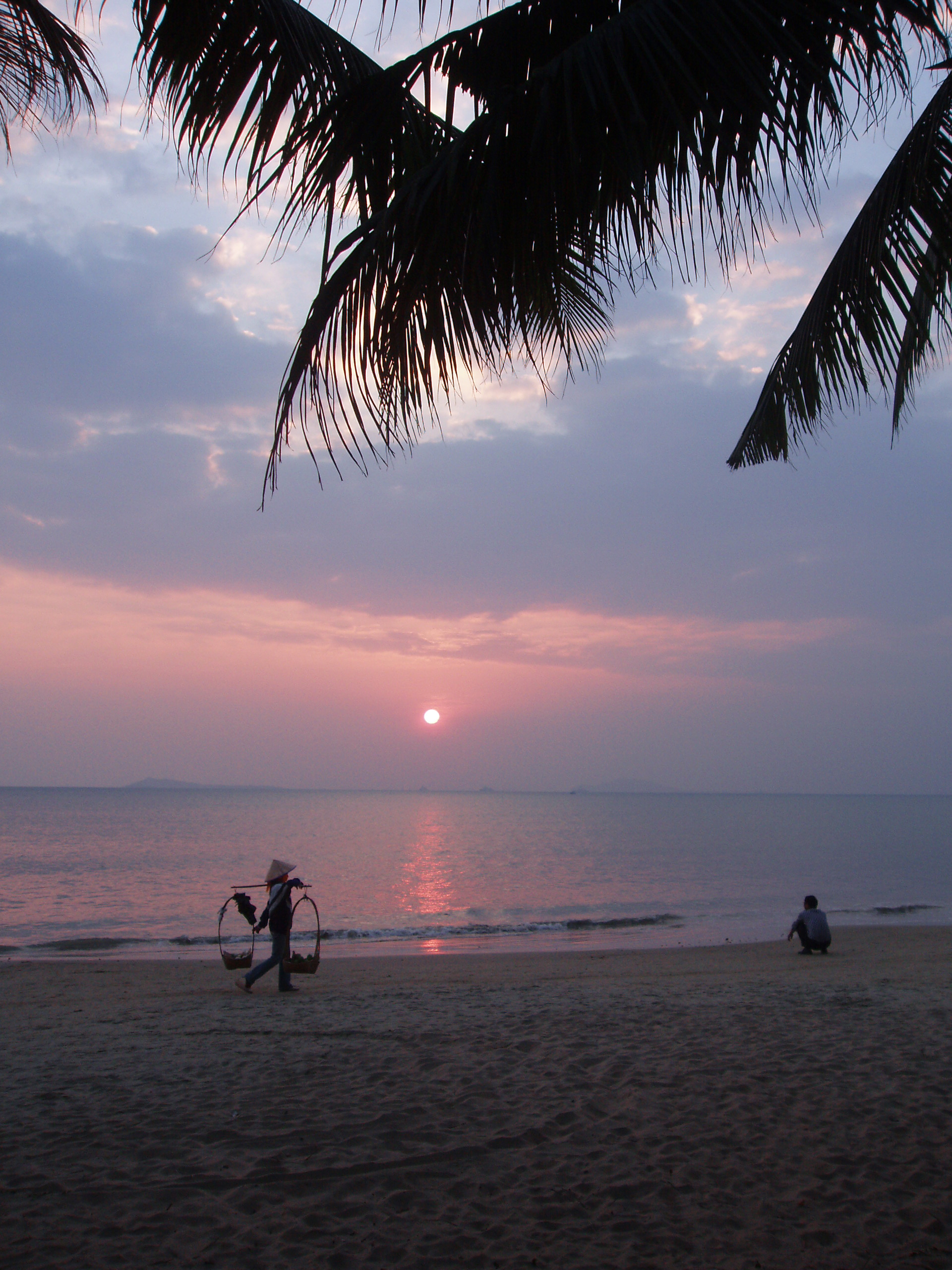
Sunset at Sanya Bay

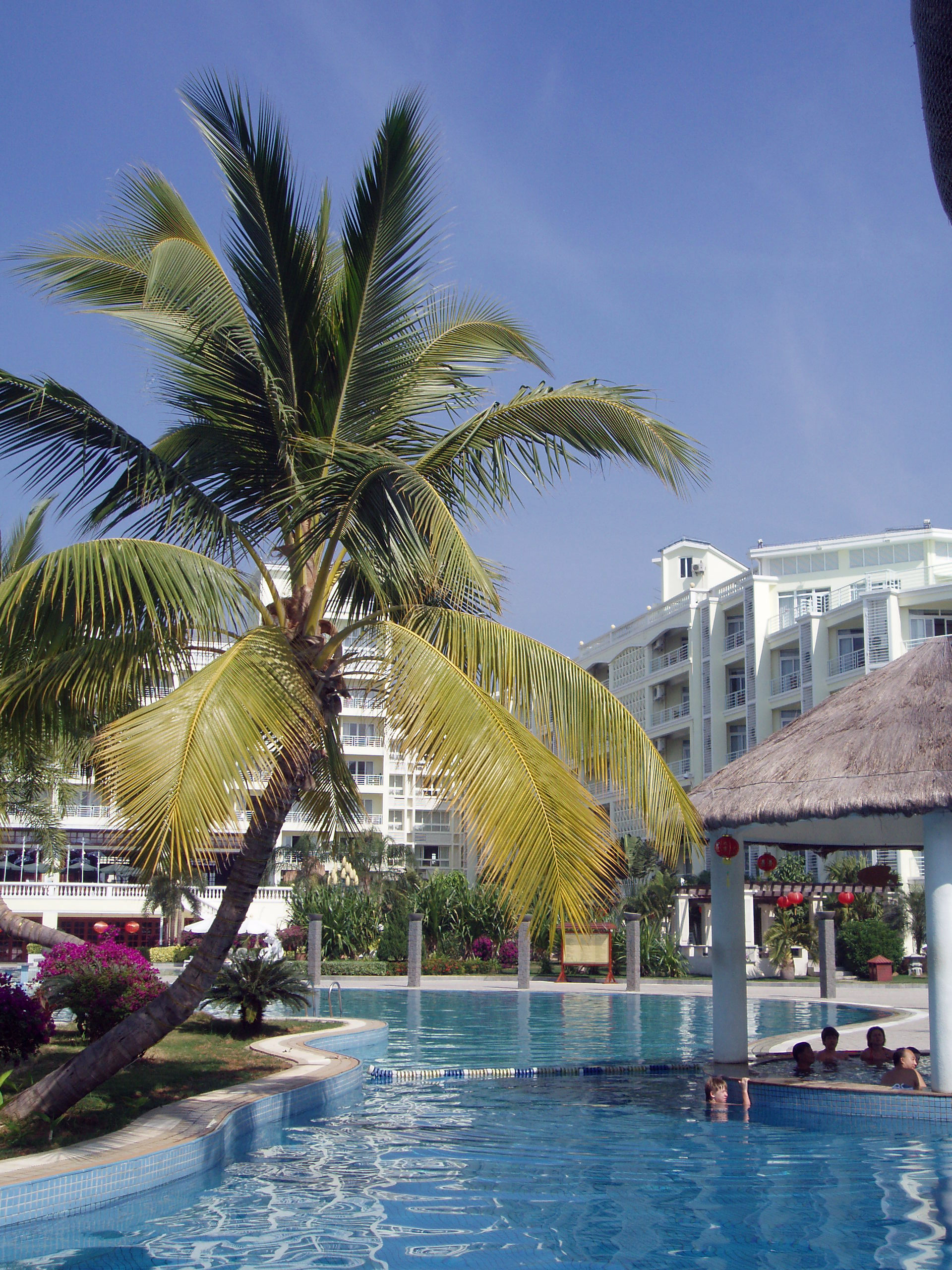
A hotel in Sanya

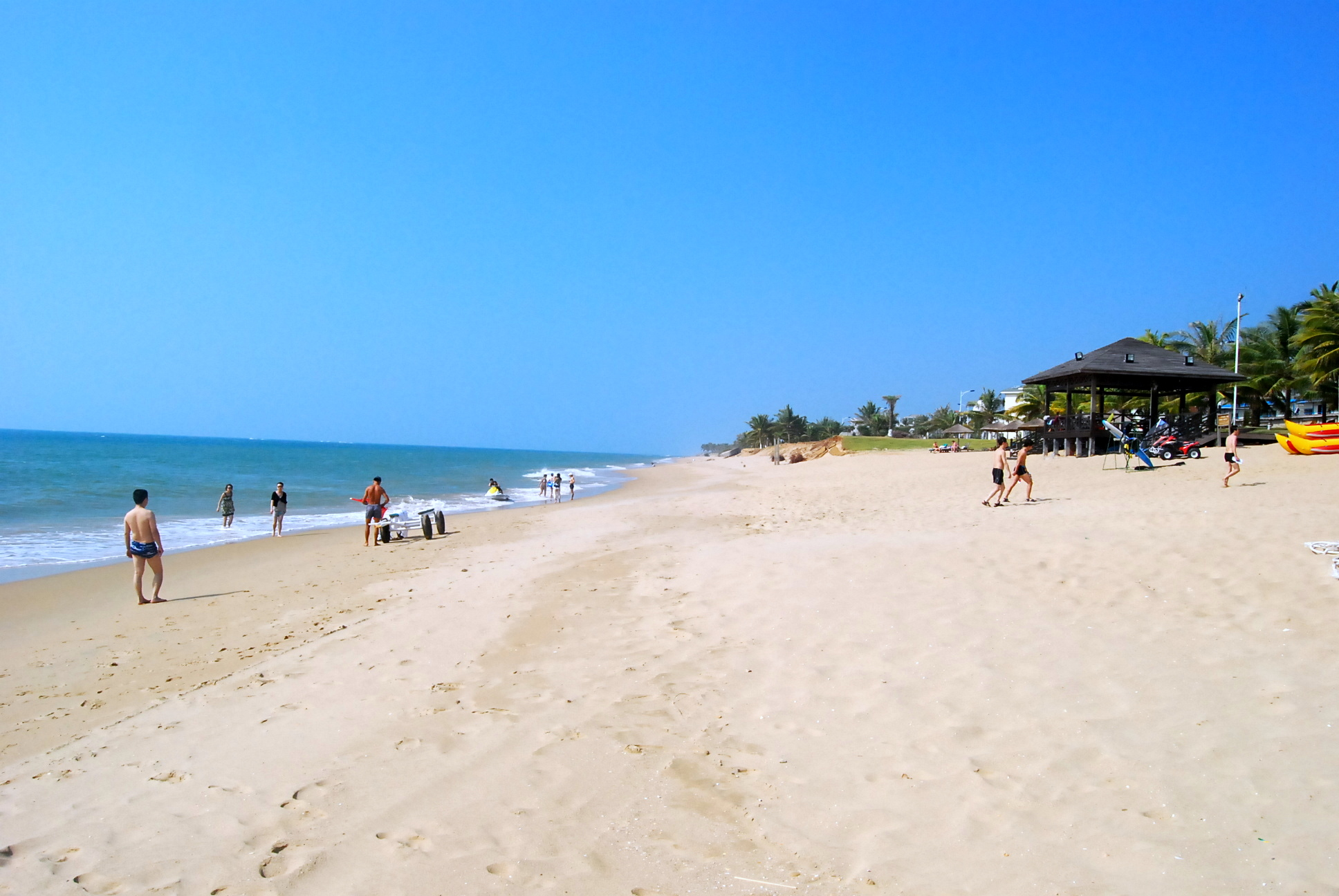
Sanya Bay Beach

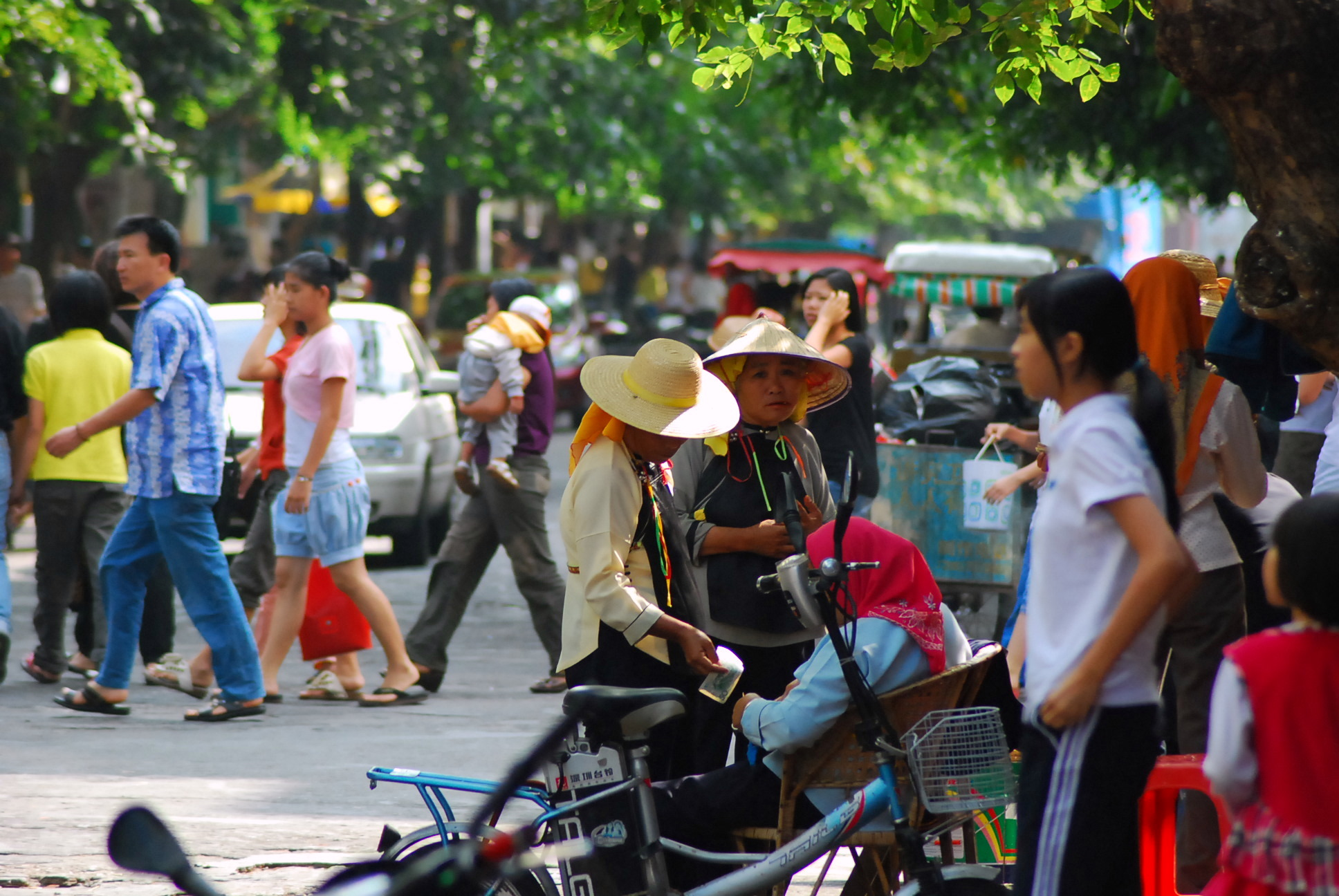
A street corner
