= Tianya, Sanya =

Tianya 天涯区
- District
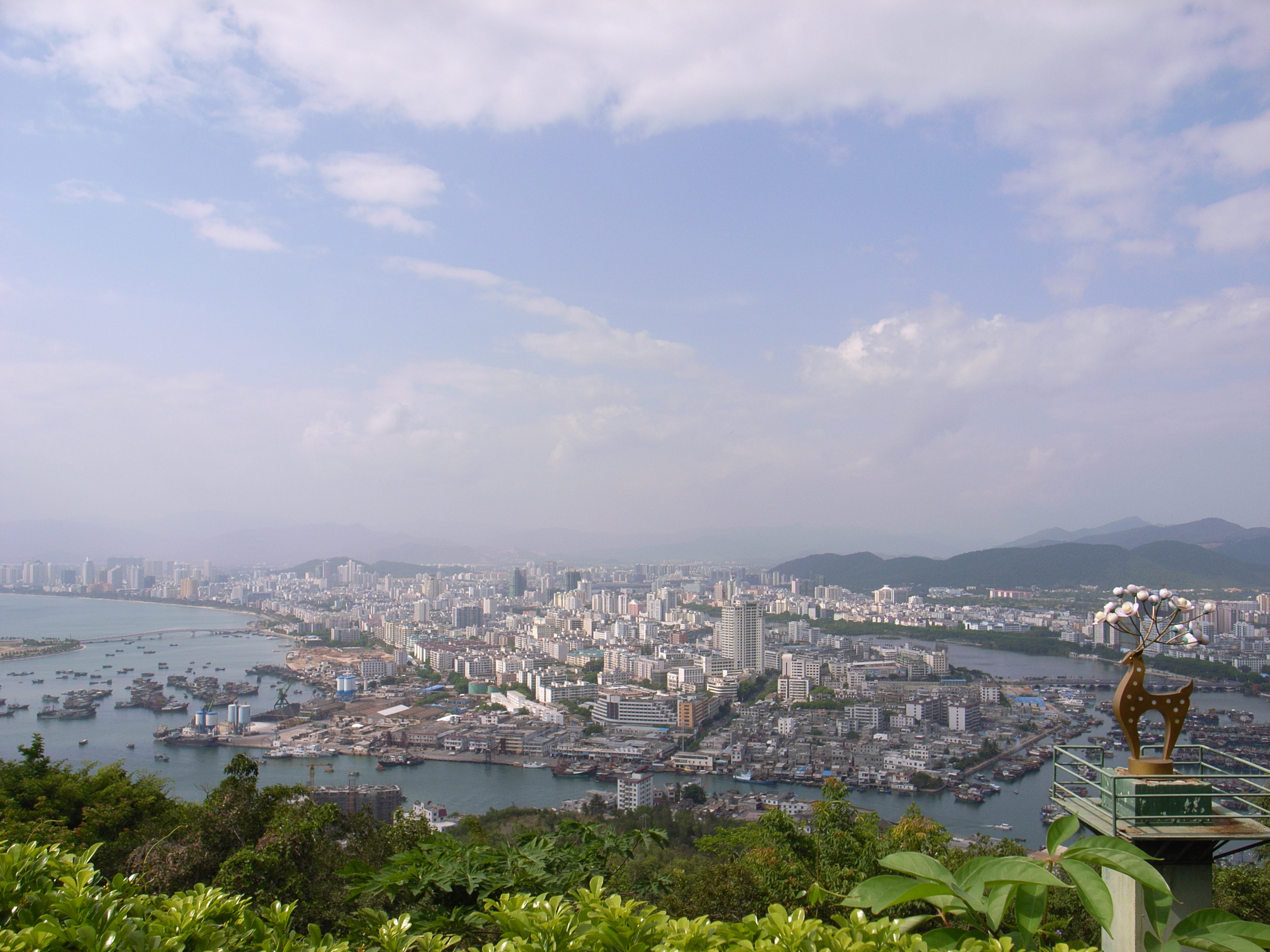

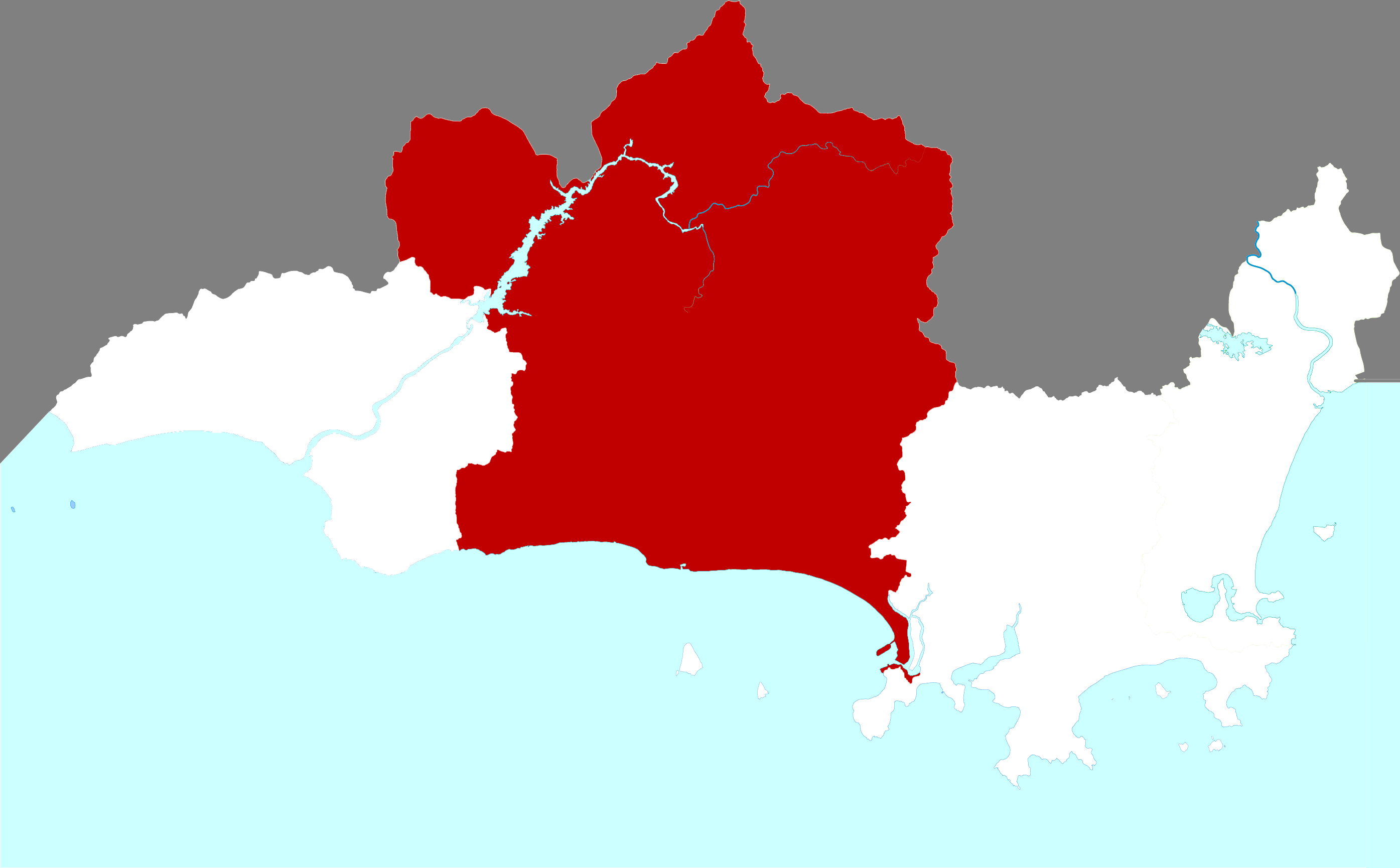
- Location of Tianya in Sanya

- Location in Hainan
- Coordinates: 18°14′50″N 109°30′23″E
- Country: People's Republic of China
- Province: Hainan
- Prefecture-level city: Sanya

Area
  - Total: 946.79 km^{2} (365.56 sq mi)

Population (2013)
  - Total: 250,000
  - Density: 260/km^{2} (680/sq mi)
- Time zone: UTC+8 (China standard time)

Tianya (Chinese: 天涯区; pinyin: Tiānyá Qū) is a county-level district under the jurisdiction of the city of Sanya, Hainan. The district was established on 12 February 2014.

== Former administrative subdivisions ==
Tianya has jurisdiction over the former towns and subdistricts of:

English name	Simplified	Pinyin	Area	Population	Density
Hexi (Sub)District	河西区街道办	Héxī Qū Jiēdào Bàn	10	134,026	13,403
Fenghuang	凤凰镇	Fènghuáng Zhèn	487	66,801	137
Tianya	天涯镇	Tiānyá Zhèn	269	34,934	130
Yucai	育才镇	Yùcái Zhèn	315	17,515	56
Licai Farm	国营立才农场	Guóyíng Lìcái Nóngchǎng	N.D.	16,659	N.D.
