= 2018 FIBA 3x3 World Cup – Men's tournament =

2018 FIBA 3x3 World Cup
Tournament details
- Host country: Philippines
- City: Manila
- Dates: June 8–12
- Teams: 20

Final positions
- Champions: Serbia (4th title)
- Runners-up: Netherlands
- Third place: Slovenia
- Fourth place: Poland

Tournament statistics
- MVP: (Serbia) Dušan Bulut

The 2018 FIBA 3x3 World Cup was held in Bocaue in the Manila region, Philippines, and was contested by 20 teams.

== Participating teams ==
All five FIBA zones were represented. The top 20 teams, including the hosts, based on the FIBA National Federation ranking qualified for the tournament.

Ecuador was replaced by Indonesia.

FIBA Africa Team Nigeria (20)	FIBA Americas Team Brazil (6) Canada (14)	FIBA Asia and FIBA Oceania Team Mongolia (11) Jordan (13) Japan (15) New Zealand (16) Kyrgyzstan (17) Indonesia (18) Philippines (19) {hosts}	FIBA Europe Team Serbia (1) Slovenia (2) Russia (3) Latvia (4) Ukraine (5) Poland (7) Netherlands (8) Romania (9) Estonia (10) Croatia (12)

== Players ==
Seed	Team	Players
6	Brazil	William Evangelista, Marcellus Sarmento, Carlos Silva Jr., Luis Soriani
14	Canada	Michael Linklater, Nolan Brudehl, Steve Sir, Michael Lieffers
12	Croatia	Duji Kaliterna, Hrvoje Marin, Toni Mindoljević, Ivan Rašetina
10	Estonia	Martin Dorbek, Joonas Järveläinen, Maik-Kalev Kotsar, Jaan Puidet
18	Indonesia	Ebrahim Enguio, Erick Jonathan Gosal, Rivaldo Pangesthio, Fandi Andika Ramadhani
15	Japan	Masahiro Komatsu, Tatsuhito Noro, Tomoya Ochiai, Keita Suzuki
13	Jordan	Yousef Awamleh, Ali El-Zubi, Ibrahim Hamati, Malek Khashan
17	Kyrgyzstan	Zhanysh Adiev, Shakirzhan Kuranbaev, Stanislav Lukonin, Evgenii Pekhov
4	Latvia	Agnis Čavars, Edgars Krūmiņš, Kārlis Lasmanis, Nauris Miezis
11	Mongolia	Davaasambuugiin Delgernyam, Enkhbatyn Dölgöön, Enkhtaivany Tserenbaatar, Gotovyn Tsengüünbayar
8	Netherlands	Jesper Jobse, Aron Roijé, Dimeo Van Der Horst, Sjoerd Van Vilsteren
16	New Zealand	Aaron Bailey-Nowell, Everard Bartlett, Karl Noyer, Sam Timmins
20	Nigeria	Azuoma Dike, David Godwin, Lucky Subel Okoh, Abdul Yahaya
19	Philippines	Roger Pogoy, Stanley Pringle, Troy Rosario, Christian Standhardinger
7	Poland	Michael Hicks, Paweł Pawłowski, Szymon Rduch, Marcin Sroka
9	Romania	Dragoș-Alin Andrieș, Marius Ciotlaus, George Anton Andrei Diaconescu, Vlad Florin Dumitrescu
3	Russia	Ilya Alexandrov, Maksim Dybovskii, Dmitry Korshakov, Victor Pavlenko
1	Serbia	Dušan Bulut, Dejan Majstorović, Marko Savić, Stefan Stojačić
2	Slovenia	Simon Finžgar, Adin Kavgić, Gašper Ovnik, Anže Srebovt
5	Ukraine	Oleksandr Kolchenko, Dmytro Lypovtsev, Stanislav Tymofeyenko, Maksym Zakurdaiev

== Preliminary round ==
=== Pool A ===
Pos	Team	Pld	W	L	PF	PA	PD	Qualification	(Serbia)	(Netherlands)	(New Zealand)	(Romania)	(Kyrgyzstan)
1	Serbia	4	4	0	85	51	+34	Knockout stage	—	21–17	22–13	21–12	21–9
2	Netherlands	4	3	1	81	54	+27	Knockout stage	17–21	—	21–15	21–11	22–7
3	New Zealand	4	1	3	60	74	−14		13–22	15–21	—	12–16	20–15
4	Romania	4	1	3	57	74	−17		12–21	11–21	16–12	—	18–20
5	Kyrgyzstan	4	1	3	51	81	−30		9–21	7–22	15–20	20–18	—

Source: FIBA
Rules for classification: 1) Wins; 2) Head-to-head record; 3) Points scored; 4) Higher seed.

=== Pool B ===
Pos	Team	Pld	W	L	PF	PA	PD	Qualification	(Slovenia)	(Poland)	(Estonia)	(Japan)	(Indonesia)
1	Slovenia	4	3	1	81	57	+24	Knockout stage	—	17–21	21–15	22–14	21–7
2	Poland	4	3	1	76	56	+20	Knockout stage	21–17	—	13–17	20–16	22–6
3	Estonia	4	3	1	71	55	+16		15–21	17–13	—	17–11	22–10
4	Japan	4	1	3	59	70	−11		14–22	16–20	11–17	—	18–11
5	Indonesia	4	0	4	34	83	−49		7–21	6–22	10–22	11–18	—

Source: FIBA
Rules for classification: 1) Wins; 2) Head-to-head record; 3) Points scored; 4) Higher seed.

=== Pool C ===
Pos	Team	Pld	W	L	PF	PA	PD	Qualification	(Canada)	(Mongolia)	(Philippines)	(Russia)	(Brazil)
1	Canada	4	4	0	83	55	+28	Knockout stage	—	21–15	20–19	20–17	22–4
2	Mongolia	4	3	1	76	72	+4	Knockout stage	15–21	—	21–17	21–18	19–16
3	Philippines (H)	4	2	2	70	60	+10		19–20	17–21	—	19–12	15–7
4	Russia	4	1	3	67	76	−9		17–20	18–21	12–19	—	20–16
5	Brazil	4	0	4	43	76	−33		4–22	16–19	7–15	16–20	—

Source: FIBA
Rules for classification: 1) Wins; 2) Head-to-head record; 3) Points scored; 4) Higher seed.
(H) Hosts

=== Pool D ===
Pos	Team	Pld	W	L	PF	PA	PD	Qualification	(Latvia)	(Ukraine)	(Croatia)	(Nigeria)	(Jordan)
1	Latvia	4	4	0	86	61	+25	Knockout stage	—	21–18	21–19	22–11	22–13
2	Ukraine	4	3	1	83	57	+26	Knockout stage	18–21	—	22–11	22–11	21–14
3	Croatia	4	2	2	74	58	+16		19–21	11–22	—	22–8	22–7
4	Nigeria	4	1	3	51	73	−22		11–22	11–22	8–22	—	21–7
5	Jordan	4	0	4	41	86	−45		13–22	14–21	7–22	7–21	—

Source: FIBA
Rules for classification: 1) Wins; 2) Head-to-head record; 3) Points scored; 4) Higher seed.

== Knockout stage ==
Quarter-finals
Serbia	21
Mongolia	8
Latvia	15
Poland	21
Slovenia	21
Ukraine	15
Canada	16
Netherlands	18

Semi-finals
Serbia	21
Poland	19
Slovenia	16
Netherlands	21

Final
Serbia	16
Netherlands	13
Third place
Poland	16
Slovenia	21

== Final standings ==
#	Team	Pld	W	L	PF	PA	PD
1st place, gold medalist(s)	Serbia	7	7	0	143	91	+52
2nd place, silver medalist(s)	Netherlands	7	5	2	133	102	+31
3rd place, bronze medalist(s)	Slovenia	7	5	2	139	109	+30
4th	Poland	7	4	3	132	113	+19
Eliminated in the quarterfinals
5th	Canada	5	4	1	99	73	+26
6th	Latvia	5	4	1	101	82	+19
7th	Ukraine	5	3	2	98	78	+20
8th	Mongolia	5	3	2	84	93	–9
Eliminated in the preliminary round
9th	Estonia	4	3	1	71	55	+16
10th	Croatia	4	2	2	74	58	+16
11th	Philippines	4	2	2	70	60	+10
12th	Russia	4	1	3	67	76	–9
13th	Japan	4	1	3	59	70	–11
14th	New Zealand	4	1	3	60	74	–14
15th	Romania	4	1	3	57	74	–17
16th	Nigeria	4	1	3	51	73	–22
17th	Kyrgyzstan	4	1	3	51	81	–30
18th	Brazil	4	0	4	43	76	–33
19th	Jordan	4	0	4	41	86	–45
20th	Indonesia	4	0	4	34	83	–49

== Awards ==
2018 FIBA 3x3 World Cup champion

Serbia
Fourth title

=== Individual awards ===
Most Valuable Player

- (Serbia) Dušan Bulut (SRB)

Team of the Tournament

- (Serbia) Dušan Bulut (SRB)
- (Poland) Michael Hicks (POL)
- (Netherlands) Jesper Jobse (NED)
