= 2019 FIBA 3x3 World Cup – Individual contests =

As part of the 2019 FIBA 3x3 World Cup held from June 18 to 23, 2019 in Amsterdam, Netherlands, three tournaments in addition to the main 3x3 men's and women's tournaments were contested. The Dunk contest was for men, the Skills contest for women, and the Shoot-out contest for both men and women.

== Dunk contest ==
=== Qualification phase ===
Format

Each player competed in two rounds and four players with the highest score advances to the knockout stage. In a case of a tie, the tied players would have to perform again and in case they were still tied, the jury would have to decide the player who will advance through a majority decision.

| Rank | Name | Nationality | Round 1 | Round 2 | Total |
|---|---|---|---|---|---|
| | Kristaps Dārgais | Latvia | | | |
| | Piotr Grabowski | Poland | | | |
| | Remco Frankin | Netherlands | | | |
| | Vadym Poddubchenko | Ukraine | | | |

=== Knockout stage ===
Two players will compete for three rounds instead of two.

Semi-final
| Rank | Name | Team | Round 1 | Round 2 | Total |
|---|---|---|---|---|---|
| | Kristaps Dārgais | Latvia | | | |
| | Piotr Grabowski | Poland | | | |
| | Remco Frankin | Netherlands | | | |
| | Vadym Poddubchenko | Ukraine | | | |

Final
| Rank | Name | Team | Round 1 | Round 2 | Round 3 | Total |
|---|---|---|---|---|---|---|
| 1 | | | | | | |
| 2 | | | | | | |

== Skills contest ==
The skills contest was contested by women players from the qualified 3x3 national teams of the main tournament. Each team can enter at most a single player for the competition. The contest which had a time limit of 45 seconds involves a qualification phase and a knockout round. The players begins on the starting line on the side of their choice. Upon a signal, the player must execute the following in order:

- A corner shot
- Pass a slalom through 4 cones while dribbling
- A straight pass into a targe
- Pass another slalom with 2 balls forward and then backwards
- Another straight pass
- Dribble through a slalom and score the basket

The four women with the best time record qualify for the knock-out round

=== Qualification phase ===
| Rank | Name | Team | Time | Notes |
|---|---|---|---|---|
| 1 | Shadi Abdolvand | Iran | 28" | Q |
| 2 | Liene Stalidzāne | Latvia | 34" | |
| 3 | Núria Martínez | Spain | 38" | |
| 4 | Ganzul Davaasuren | Mongolia | – | |
| 5 | Leyla Halilova | Turkmenistan | – | |
| 6 | Fleur Kuijt | Netherlands | – | |

| Rank | Name | Team | Time | Notes |
|---|---|---|---|---|
| 1 | Rae Lin D'Alie | Italy | 22" | Q |
| 2 | Marie-Eve Paget | France | 26" | Q |
| 2 | Carla Puntí | Andorra | 26" | Q |
| 4 | Yevheniia Spitkovska | Ukraine | 39" | |
| 5 | Tricia Mary Aoijs | Indonesia | – | |
| 6 | Micaela Cocks | New Zealand | – | |
| 7 | Anna Leshkovtseva | Russia | – | |
| 8 | Mirjana Milenkovic | Switzerland | – | |

=== Knockout round ===
Semi-finals
(Italy) Rae Lin D'Alie
(Iran) Shadi Abdolvand
(France) Marie-Eve Paget
(Andorra) Carla Puntí

Final
(Italy) Rae Lin D'Alie
(France) Marie-Eve Paget
Bronze medal match
(Iran) Shadi Abdolvand
(Andorra) Carla Puntí

== Shoot-out contest ==
The shoot-out contest is a mixed-gender competition with at most one male and one female player from 3x3 national teams participating in the main tournaments.

=== Qualification phase ===
Format

Each player were to attempt 10 shots with every successful shot worth one point

- Five from the right wing
- Five from the left wing (45º angle from the baseline) and with a 30" shot clock.

Two male and two female players with the most points in the shortest amount of time advance to the final. In case of a tie or players scoring the same points within the same amount of time, the tied players were tasked to shoot again. The round concluded on June 11, 2018.

Men

Day 1
| Rank | Name | Team | Score | Time | Notes |
|---|---|---|---|---|---|
| 1 | Edgars Krūmiņš | Latvia | 7 | 28" | Q |
| 2 | Stanislav Tymofeyenko | Ukraine | 6 | 27" | |
| 3 | Michael Hicks | Poland | 5 | 26" | |
| 4 | Tom Wright | Australia | 4 | 28" | |
| 5 | Aleksandr Antonikovskii | Russia | 4 | 30" | |
| 6 | William Weihermann | Brazil | 3 | 24" | |
| 7 | Ryuto Yasuoka | Japan | 3 | 29" | |
| 8 | Delgernyam Davaasambuu | Mongolia | 3 | 30" | |
| 9 | Martin Dorbek | Estonia | 1 | 28" | |
| 10 | Wil Martínez | Puerto Rico | – | – | |

Day 2
| Rank | Name | Team | Score | Time | Notes |
|---|---|---|---|---|---|
| 1 | Marijus Uzupis | Lithuania | 6 | 27.2 | Q |
| 2 | Özgür Şahin | Turkey | 5 | 25.4 | |
| 3 | Kim Minseob | South Korea | 5 | 28.4 | |
| 4 | Dejan Majstorović | Serbia | 5 | 30" | |
| 5 | Lucas Dussoulier | France | 4 | 29.4 | |
| 5 | Damon Huffman | United States | 4 | 29.4 | |
| 7 | Adin Kavgić | Slovenia | 3 | 27.6 | |
| 8 | Li Haonan | China | 3 | 30" | |
| 9 | Aron Roijé | Netherlands | 2 | 30" | |
| 10 | Fadi Abilmona | Qatar | – | – | |

Women

Day 3
| Rank | Name | Team | Score | Time | Notes |
|---|---|---|---|---|---|
| 1 | Jiang Jiayin | China | 9 | – | Q |
| 2 | Alexandra Theodorean | Hungary | 5 | 28" | |
| 3 | Jill Bettonvil | Netherlands | 5 | – | |
| 3 | Delaram Vakili | Iran | 5 | – | |
| 5 | Vega Gimeno | Spain | 4 | 28" | |
| 6 | Chimeddolgor Enkhtaivan | Mongolia | 4 | 29" | |
| 7 | Klára Marečková | Czech Republic | 3 | 27" | |
| 8 | Ieva Kūlīte | Latvia | 3 | 29" | |
| 9 | Ayna Gokova | Turkmenistan | 3 | – | |

Day 4
| Rank | Name | Team | Score | Time | Notes |
|---|---|---|---|---|---|
| 1 | Marcella Filippi | Italy | 5 | – | Q |
| 2 | Ana Maria Filip | France | 5 | – | |
| 3 | Antonia Farnworth | New Zealand | 4 | – | |
| 3 | Olga Frolkina | Russia | 4 | – | |
| 3 | Kiho Miyashita | Japan | 4 | – | |
| 6 | Claudia Guri | Andorra | 2 | – | |
| 6 | Evita Herminjard | Switzerland | 2 | – | |
| 6 | Alice Kunek | Australia | 2 | – | |
| 6 | Dyah Lestari | Indonesia | 2 | – | |
| 10 | Olga Maznichenko | Ukraine | – | – | |

=== Final ===
Format

Players were to attempt 18 shots from four different locations:

- Five from the right wing (45° angle from the baseline)
- Five from the top of the arc
- Five from the left wing (45° from the baseline)
- Three from the 3x3 logo.

Shots made from the 3x3 are worth 2 points while the rest of the shots of are worth 1 point. The tiebreaker which was used in the qualification phase is used again for the final.

Day 6
| Rank | Name | Team | Score | Time | Notes |
|---|---|---|---|---|---|
| | Marcella Filippi | Italy | | | |
| | Jiang Jiayin | China | | | |
| | Edgars Krūmiņš | Latvia | | | |
| | Marijus Uzupis | Lithuania | | | |

== Results ==
| Event | Gold | Silver | Bronze |
|---|---|---|---|
| Skills contest | (France) Marie Eve Paget (FRA) | (Italy) Rae Lin D'Alie (ITA) | (Iran) Shadi Abdolvand (IRI) |
| Dunk contest | (Ukraine) Vadym Poddubchenko (UKR) | (Poland) Piotr Grabowski (POL) | (Latvia) Kristaps Dārgais (LAT) |
| Shoot-out contest (mixed) | | | |
