= Poland at the 2020 Summer Olympics =

- IOC code: POL
- NOC: Polish Olympic Committee
- Website: www.pkol.pl (in Polish)

in Tokyo, Japan 23 July 2021 – 8 August 2021
- Competitors: 210 in 24 sports
- Flag bearers (opening): Maja Włoszczowska; Paweł Korzeniowski
- Flag bearer (closing): Karolina Naja
- Medals Ranked 17th: Gold 4 Silver 5 Bronze 5 Total 14

Summer Olympics appearances (overview)
- 1924; 1928; 1932; 1936; 1948; 1952; 1956; 1960; 1964; 1968; 1972; 1976; 1980; 1984; 1988; 1992; 1996; 2000; 2004; 2008; 2012; 2016; 2020; 2024; 2028

Other related appearances
- Russian Empire (1900, 1912); Austria (1908–1912)

Poland competed at the 2020 Summer Olympics in Tokyo. Originally scheduled to take place from 24 July to 9 August 2020, the Games were postponed to 23 July to 8 August 2021, because of the COVID-19 pandemic. Since the nation's official debut in 1924, Polish athletes have appeared in every edition of the Summer Olympic Games, with the exception of the 1984 Summer Olympics in Los Angeles, because of the Soviet boycott. The number of total medals was Poland's highest since 2000 Summer Olympics when Poland also had 14 medals.

== Medalists ==
Medal	Name	Sport	Event	Date
Gold	Iga Baumgart-Witan; Kajetan Duszyński; Małgorzata Hołub-Kowalik; Natalia Kaczmarek; Dariusz Kowaluk; Justyna Święty-Ersetic; Karol Zalewski	Athletics	Mixed 4 × 400 metres relay	31 July
Gold	Anita Włodarczyk	Athletics	Women's hammer throw	3 August
Gold	Wojciech Nowicki	Athletics	Men's hammer throw	4 August
Gold	Dawid Tomala	Athletics	Men's 50 kilometres walk	6 August
Silver	Agnieszka Kobus-Zawojska; Maria Sajdak; Marta Wieliczko; Katarzyna Zillmann	Rowing	Women's quadruple sculls	28 July
Silver	Karolina Naja; Anna Puławska	Canoeing	Women's K-2 500 metres	3 August
Silver	Agnieszka Skrzypulec; Jolanta Ogar-Hill	Sailing	Women's 470	4 August
Silver	Maria Andrejczyk	Athletics	Women's javelin throw	6 August
Silver	Iga Baumgart-Witan; Małgorzata Hołub-Kowalik; Natalia Kaczmarek; Anna Kiełbasińska; Justyna Święty-Ersetic	Athletics	Women's 4 × 400 metres relay	7 August
Bronze	Tadeusz Michalik	Wrestling	Men's Greco-Roman 97 kg	3 August
Bronze	Malwina Kopron	Athletics	Women's hammer throw	3 August
Bronze	Patryk Dobek	Athletics	Men's 800 metres	4 August
Bronze	Paweł Fajdek	Athletics	Men's hammer throw	4 August
Bronze	Karolina Naja; Anna Puławska; Justyna Iskrzycka; Helena Wiśniewska	Canoeing	Women's K-4 500 metres	7 August

Medals by sport
Sport	1st place, gold medalist(s)	2nd place, silver medalist(s)	3rd place, bronze medalist(s)	Total
Athletics	4	2	3	9
Canoeing	0	1	1	2
Rowing	0	1	0	1
Sailing	0	1	0	1
Wrestling	0	0	1	1
Total	4	5	5	14

Medals by gender
Gender	1st place, gold medalist(s)	2nd place, silver medalist(s)	3rd place, bronze medalist(s)	Total
Male	2	0	3	5
Female	1	5	2	8
Mixed	1	0	0	1
Total	4	5	5	14

== Competitors ==
The following is the list of number of competitors in the Games.

Sport	Men	Women	Total
Archery	1	1	2
Athletics	31	32	63
Basketball	4	0	4
Boxing	1	3	4
Canoeing	5	8	13
Cycling	9	8	17
Equestrian	1	2	3
Fencing	0	4	4
Golf	1	0	1
Gymnastics	0	1	1
Judo	2	4	6
Modern pentathlon	2	1	3
Rowing	12	8	20
Sailing	3	6	9
Shooting	1	4	5
Skateboarding	0	1	1
Sport climbing	0	1	1
Swimming	13	4	17
Table tennis	0	3	3
Taekwondo	0	2	2
Tennis	3	3	6
Volleyball	16	0	16
Weightlifting	2	1	3
Wrestling	3	3	6
Total	110	100	210

== Archery ==
Two Polish archers directly qualified for their respective individual recurve events at the Games by reaching the quarterfinal stage and obtaining one of the seven available spots each at the 2021 Final Qualification Tournament in Paris, France.

Athlete	Event	Ranking round		Round of 64	Round of 32	Round of 16	Quarterfinals	Semifinals	Final / BM	
Athlete	Event	Score	Seed	Opposition Score	Opposition Score	Opposition Score	Opposition Score	Opposition Score	Opposition Score	Rank
Sławomir Napłoszek	Men's individual	637	59	Wijler (NED); L 4–6	Did not advance					
Sylwia Zyzańska	Women's individual	630	42	Boari (ITA); L 0–6	Did not advance					
Sławomir Napłoszek; Sylwia Zyzańska	Mixed team	1267	24	—N/a		Did not advance				

== Athletics ==
Polish athletes further achieved the entry standards, either by qualifying time or by world ranking, in the following track and field events (up to a maximum of 3 athletes in each event):

Key

- Note–Ranks given for track events are within the athlete's heat only
- Q = Qualified for the next round
- q = Qualified for the next round as a fastest loser or, in field events, by position without achieving the qualifying target
- qR = Advanced to the next round by referee
- NR = National record
- OR = Olympic record
- N/A = Round not applicable for the event
- Bye = Athlete not required to compete in round

Track & road events
Men

Athlete	Event	Heat		Semifinal		Final	
Athlete	Event	Result	Rank	Result	Rank	Result	Rank
Karol Zalewski	400 m	2:15.38	8	Did not advance			
Mateusz Borkowski	800 m	1:45.34	2 Q	1:46.54	8	Did not advance	
Patryk Dobek	800 m	1:46.59	3 Q	1:44.60	1 Q	1:45.39	3rd place, bronze medalist(s)
Marcin Lewandowski	1500 m	4:43.96	15 qR	DNF		Did not advance	
Michał Rozmys	1500 m	3:36.28	6 Q	3:54.53	13 qR	3:32.67 PB	8
Damian Czykier	110 m hurdles	13.61	4 Q	13.63	6	Did not advance	
Kajetan Duszyński; Patryk Grzegorzewicz*; Dariusz Kowaluk; Jakub Krzewina*; Mateusz Rzeźniczak; Wiktor Suwara; Karol Zalewski	4 × 400 m relay	2:58.55	1Q	—N/a		2:58.46	5
Marcin Chabowski	Marathon	—N/a				Did not finish	
Arkadiusz Gardzielewski	Marathon	—N/a				2:22:50	63
Adam Nowicki	Marathon	—N/a				2:17:19	38
Łukasz Niedziałek	20 km walk	—N/a				DNF	
Rafał Augustyn	50 km walk	—N/a				DNF	
Artur Brzozowski	50 km walk	—N/a				3:54:08	12
Dawid Tomala	50 km walk	—N/a				3:50:08	1st place, gold medalist(s)

Women

Athlete	Event	Heat		Semifinal		Final	
Athlete	Event	Result	Rank	Result	Rank	Result	Rank
Natalia Kaczmarek	400 m	51.06	2 Q	50.79	4	Did not advance	
Joanna Jóźwik	800 m	2:01.87	3 Q	2:02.32	5	Did not advance	
Angelika Sarna	800 m	2:02.18	4	Did not advance			
Anna Wielgosz	800 m	2:03.20	6	Did not advance			
Martyna Galant	1500 m	4:05.03 PB	8 q	4:06.01	10	Did not advance	
Klaudia Siciarz	100 m hurdles	12.98	6 q	12.84	5	Did not advance	
Pia Skrzyszowska	100 m hurdles	12.75 PB	3 Q	12.89	6	Did not advance	
Joanna Linkiewicz	400 m hurdles	54.93 PB	4 Q	55.67	5	Did not advance	
Alicja Konieczek	3000 m steeplechase	9:31.79	8	—N/a		Did not advance	
Aneta Konieczek	3000 m steeplechase	10:07.25	12	—N/a		Did not advance	
Klaudia Adamek; Marlena Gola; Paulina Paluch; Marika Popowicz-Drapała; Pia Skrzyszowska	4 × 100 m relay	43.09	4	—N/a		Did not advance	
Iga Baumgart-Witan; Małgorzata Hołub-Kowalik; Natalia Kaczmarek; Anna Kiełbasińska*; Kornelia Lesiewicz; Justyna Święty-Ersetic	4 × 400 m relay	3:23.10	1 Q	—N/a		3:20.53 NR	2nd place, silver medalist(s)
Aleksandra Lisowska	Marathon	—N/a				2:35:33	35
Angelika Mach	Marathon	—N/a				2:42:26	59
Karolina Nadolska	Marathon	—N/a				2:32:04	14
Katarzyna Zdziebło	20 km walk	—N/a				1:31:29	10

Mixed

Athlete	Event	Heat		Final	
Athlete	Event	Result	Rank	Result	Rank
Iga Baumgart-Witan*; Kajetan Duszyński; Małgorzata Hołub-Kowalik*; Natalia Kaczmarek; Dariusz Kowaluk*; Justyna Święty-Ersetic; Karol Zalewski	4 × 400 m relay	3:10.44 OR	1 Q	3:09.87 OR	1st place, gold medalist(s)

Field events
Men

Athlete	Event	Qualification		Final	
Athlete	Event	Distance	Position	Distance	Position
Piotr Lisek	Pole vault	5.75	11 q	5.80	6
Robert Sobera	Pole vault	5.65	15	Did not advance	
Paweł Wojciechowski	Pole vault	5.30	28	Did not advance	
Konrad Bukowiecki	Shot put	20.01	23	Did not advance	
Michał Haratyk	Shot put	20.86	13	Did not advance	
Piotr Małachowski	Discus throw	62.68	15	Did not advance	
Bartłomiej Stój	Discus throw	62.84	14	Did not advance	
Marcin Krukowski	Javelin throw	74.65	28	Did not advance	
Cyprian Mrzygłód	Javelin throw	78.33	20	Did not advance	
Paweł Fajdek	Hammer throw	76.46	9 q	81.53	3rd place, bronze medalist(s)
Wojciech Nowicki	Hammer throw	79.78	1 Q	82.52	1st place, gold medalist(s)

Women

Athlete	Event	Qualification		Final	
Athlete	Event	Distance	Position	Distance	Position
Kamila Lićwinko	High jump	1.95	8 Q	1.93	11
Paulina Guba	Shot put	16.98	27	Did not advance	
Klaudia Kardasz	Shot put	17.76	18	Did not advance	
Maria Andrejczyk	Javelin throw	65.24	1 Q	64.61	2nd place, silver medalist(s)
Joanna Fiodorow	Hammer throw	72.32	10 q	73.83	7
Malwina Kopron	Hammer throw	73.06	8 q	75.49	3rd place, bronze medalist(s)
Anita Włodarczyk	Hammer throw	76.99	1 Q	78.48	1st place, gold medalist(s)

Combined events – Men's decathlon

Athlete	Event	100 m	LJ	SP	HJ	400 m	110H	DT	PV	JT	1500 m	Final	Rank
Paweł Wiesiołek	Result	10.83	7.27	14.90	2.02	48.24	14.95	48.27	4.80	51.60	4:30.02	8176	12
Paweł Wiesiołek	Points	899	878	784	822	898	856	834	849	612	744	8176	12

Combined events – Women's heptathlon

Athlete	Event	100H	HJ	SP	200 m	LJ	JT	800 m	Final	Rank
Adrianna Sułek	Result	13.58	1.83	12.80	24.16	5.93	36.84	2:07.92	6164	16
Adrianna Sułek	Points	1039	1016	714	965	828	607	995	6164	16

== Basketball ==
Summary

Team	Event	Group stage								Quarterfinal	Semifinal	Final / BM	
Team	Event	Opposition Score	Opposition Score	Opposition Score	Opposition Score	Opposition Score	Opposition Score	Opposition Score	Rank	Opposition Score	Opposition Score	Opposition Score	Rank
Poland men's	Men's 3×3	Belgium; L 14–21	China; L 19–21	Japan; W 20–19	Latvia; L 14–21	Netherlands; L 20–22	ROC; W 21–16	Serbia; L 12–15	7	Did not advance			

=== 3x3 basketball ===
==== Men's tournament ====
Poland men's national 3x3 team qualified for the Olympics by securing a top three finish at the 2021 Olympic Qualifying Tournament.

Team roster

- Michael Hicks
- Paweł Pawłowski
- Szymon Rduch
- Przemysław Zamojski

Group play

Pos	Team	Pld	W	L	PF	PA	PD	Qualification
1	Serbia	7	7	0	138	91	+47	Semifinals
2	Belgium	7	4 (Note: Belgium 2–0, Latvia 1–1, Netherlands 0–2)	3	126	127	−1	Semifinals
3	Latvia	7	4	3	133	129	+4	Quarterfinals
4	Netherlands	7	4	3	132	129	+3	Quarterfinals
5	ROC	7	3	4	116	125	−9	Quarterfinals
6	Japan (H)	7	2 (Note: Japan 1–1, 123 PS; Poland 1–1, 120 PS; China 1–1, 119 PS)	5	123	134	−11	Quarterfinals
7	Poland	7	2	5	120	130	−10	
8	China	7	2	5	119	142	−23	

Source: TOCOG and FIBA
Rules for classification: 1) Wins; 2) Head-to-head record; 3) Points scored.
(H) Hosts
Notes:

24 July 2021
11:35
v

Report

Poland	14–21	Latvia
Pts: Hicks 8		Pts: Miezis 7

Aomi Urban Sports Park, Tokyo
Referees: Markos Michaelides (SUI), Edmond Ho (HKG)

24 July 2021
19:05
v

Report

Japan	19–20 (OT)	Poland
Pts: Brown, Tominaga 7		Pts: Pawłowski, Zamojski 7

Aomi Urban Sports Park, Tokyo
Referees: Vlad Ghizdareanu (ROU), Jasmina Juras (SRB)

25 July 2021
12:00
v

Report

Poland	12–15	Serbia
Pts: Pawłowski 4		Pts: Vasić 5

Aomi Urban Sports Park, Tokyo
Referees: Evgeny Ostrovskiy (RUS), Markos Michaelides (SUI)

25 July 2021
18:40
v

Report

ROC	16–21	Poland
Pts: Pisklov 6		Pts: Pawłowski 8

Aomi Urban Sports Park, Tokyo
Referees: Edmond Ho (HKG), Jasmina Juras (SRB)

26 July 2021
19:05
v

Report

Poland	19–21	China
Pts: Pawłowski 7		Pts: Hu 12

Aomi Urban Sports Park, Tokyo
Referees: Vlad Ghizdareanu (ROU), Jasmina Juras (SRB)

26 July 2021
22:25
v

Report

Netherlands	22–20 (OT)	Poland
Pts: Bekkering, Van der Horst 6		Pts: Hicks 8

Aomi Urban Sports Park, Tokyo
Referees: Markos Michaelides (SUI), Evgeny Ostrovskiy (RUS)

27 July 2021
14:40
v

Report

Belgium	16–14	Poland
Pts: Vervoort 11		Pts: Hicks 8

Aomi Urban Sports Park, Tokyo
Referees: Edmond Ho (HKG), Vlad Ghizdareanu (ROU)

== Boxing ==
Poland entered four boxers (one man and three women) to compete in the following weight classes into the Olympic tournament. Damian Durkacz (men's featherweight) and 2015 European Games bronze medalist Sandra Drabik (women's flyweight) secured the spots on the Polish squad in their respective weight divisions, either by winning the round of 16 match, advancing to the semifinal match, or scoring a box-off triumph, at the 2020 European Qualification Tournament in London and Paris. Karolina Koszewska and Elżbieta Wójcik completed the nation's boxing lineup by topping the list of eligible boxers from Europe in the women's welterweight and women's middleweight division, respectively, of the IOC's Boxing Task Force Rankings.

Athlete	Event	Round of 32	Round of 16	Quarterfinals	Semifinals	Final	
Athlete	Event	Opposition Result	Opposition Result	Opposition Result	Opposition Result	Opposition Result	Rank
Damian Durkacz	Men's lightweight	Mamedov (ROC); L 0–5	Did not advance				
Sandra Drabik	Women's flyweight	Rakhimova (UZB); L 1–4	Did not advance				
Karolina Koszewska	Women's welterweight	Yunusova (UZB); W 5–0	Sürmeneli (TUR); L 0–5	Did not advance			
Elżbieta Wójcik	Women's middleweight	—N/a	Fontijn (NED); L 1–4	Did not advance			

== Canoeing ==
=== Slalom ===
Polish canoeists qualified one boat for each of the following classes through the 2019 ICF Canoe Slalom World Championships in La Seu d'Urgell, Spain and the 2021 European Canoe Slalom Championships in Ivrea, Italy.

Athlete	Event	Preliminary						Semifinal		Final	
Athlete	Event	Run 1	Rank	Run 2	Rank	Best	Rank	Time	Rank	Time	Rank
Grzegorz Hedwig	Men's C-1	109.09	12	105.95	13	105.95	14 Q	112.16	14	Did not advance	
Krzysztof Majerczak	Men's K-1	99.86	17	95.21	13	95.21	17 Q	100.99	15	Did not advance	
Aleksandra Stach	Women's C-1	145.58	18	134.03	17	134.03	19	Did not advance			
Klaudia Zwolińska	Women's K-1	108.97	7	110.46	12	108.97	10 Q	111.76	10 Q	108.98	5

=== Sprint ===
Polish canoeists qualified six boats in each of the following distances for the Games through the 2019 ICF Canoe Sprint World Championships in Szeged, Hungary.

Men

Athlete	Event	Heats		Quarterfinals		Semifinals		Final	
Athlete	Event	Time	Rank	Time	Rank	Time	Rank	Time	Rank
Wiktor Głazunow	C-1 1000 m	4:25.996	6 QF	4:07.632	1 SF	4:09.876	7 FB	4:04.463	13
Mateusz Kamiński	C-1 1000 m	4:11.202	4 QF	4:08.172	3	Did not advance			
Tomasz Barniak; Wiktor Głazunow	C-2 1000 m	3:49.956	6 QF	3:49.770	1 SF	3:28.282	3 FA	3:32.317	7

Women

Athlete	Event	Heats		Quarterfinals		Semifinals		Final	
Athlete	Event	Time	Rank	Time	Rank	Time	Rank	Time	Rank
Dorota Borowska	C-1 200 m	47.655	1 SF	Bye		47.703	4 FA	47.116	4
Marta Walczykiewicz	K-1 200 m	41.100	2 SF	Bye		38.563	3 FA	39.170	4
Helena Wiśniewska	K-1 200 m	41.407	4 QF	41.559	3	Did not advance			
Justyna Iskrzycka	K-1 500 m	1:49.893	2 SF	Bye		1:53.899	4 FB	1:54.086	11
Marta Walczykiewicz	K-1 500 m	1:50.184	3 SF	Bye		1:53.860	3 FB	1:55.659	13
Karolina Naja; Anna Puławska	K-2 500 m	1:44.606	1 SF	Bye		1:37.219	4 FA	1:36.753	2nd place, silver medalist(s)
Karolina Naja; Anna Puławska; Justyna Iskrzycka; Helena Wiśniewska	K-4 500 m	1:33.468	1 SF	Bye		1:36.078	1 FA	1:36.445	3rd place, bronze medalist(s)

Qualification Legend: FA = Qualify to final A (medal); FB = Qualify to final B (non-medal)

== Cycling ==
=== Road ===
Poland was eligible initially to enter a squad of five riders (three men and two women) to compete in their respective Olympic road races, by virtue of their top 50 national finish (for men) and top 22 (women) in the UCI World Ranking. Due to the reallocation of unused quotas, Poland was granted an additional spot in women's road race.

Athlete	Event	Time	Rank
Maciej Bodnar	Men's road race	Did not finish	
Maciej Bodnar	Men's time trial	58:47.10	18
Michał Kwiatkowski	Men's road race	6:07:01	11
Rafał Majka	Men's road race	6:09:06	19
Marta Lach	Women's road race	3:55:13	18
Katarzyna Niewiadoma	Women's road race	3:54:31	14
Anna Plichta	Women's road race	3:55:58	27
Anna Plichta	Women's time trial	34:56.95	24

=== Track ===
Following the completion of the 2020 UCI Track Cycling World Championships, Polish riders accumulated spots for both men and women in team sprint, omnium, and madison, based on their country's results in the final UCI Olympic rankings. As a result of their place in the men's and women's team sprint, Poland won its right to enter two riders in both men's and women's sprint and men's and women's keirin.

Sprint

Athlete	Event	Qualification		Round 1	Repechage 1	Round 2	Repechage 2	Round 3	Repechage 3	Quarterfinals	Semifinals	Final	
Athlete	Event	Time Speed (km/h)	Rank	Opposition Rank	Opposition Rank	Opposition Rank	Opposition Rank	Opposition Rank	Opposition Rank	Opposition Rank	Opposition Rank	Opposition Rank	Rank
Patryk Rajkowski	Men's sprint	9.594; 75.845	14 Q	Xu C (CHN); W 10.465; 68.801	Bye	Levy (GER); L	Sahrom (MAS); L	Did not advance					
Mateusz Rudyk	Men's sprint	9.493; 75.047	7 Q	Webster (NZL); L	Barrette (CAN); Sahrom (MAS); L	Did not advance							
Marlena Karwacka	Women's sprint	11.083; 64.964	26	Did not advance									
Urszula Łoś	Women's sprint	11.047; 65.176	25	Did not advance									

Team sprint

Athlete	Event	Qualification		1st Round		Final	
Athlete	Event	Time Speed (km/h)	Rank	Opposition Time Speed (km/h)	Rank	Opposition Time Speed (km/h)	Rank
Krzysztof Maksel; Patryk Rajkowski; Mateusz Rudyk	Men's team sprint	43.516; 62.046	8	Netherlands; L 43.307; 62.346	8	New Zealand; L 46.431; 58.151	8
Marlena Karwacka; Urszula Łoś	Women's team sprint	33.244; 54.145	6	Netherlands; L 33.022; 54.509	7	Ukraine; W 33.054; 54.456	7

Qualification legend: FA=Gold medal final; FB=Bronze medal final

Keirin

Athlete	Event	1st Round	Repechage	2nd Round	3rd Round	Final
Athlete	Event	Rank	Rank	Rank	Rank	Rank
Patryk Rajkowski	Men's keirin	3 R	5	Did not advance		
Mateusz Rudyk	Men's keirin	6 R	4	Did not advance		
Marlena Karwacka	Women's keirin	5 R	4	Did not advance		
Urszula Łoś	Women's keirin	3 R	3	Did not advance		

Omnium

Athlete	Event	Scratch race		Tempo race		Elimination race		Points race		Total points	Rank
Athlete	Event	Rank	Points	Rank	Points	Rank	Points	Points	Rank	Total points	Rank
Szymon Sajnok	Men's omnium	14	14	9	24	16	10	0	14	48	16
Daria Pikulik	Women's omnium	13	16	DNF	0	DNS				DNF	

Madison

Athlete	Event	Points	Laps	Rank
Szymon Sajnok; Daniel Staniszewski	Men's madison	0	0	8
Daria Pikulik; Wiktoria Pikulik	Women's madison	9	0	6

=== Mountain biking ===
Polish mountain bikers qualified for one men's and one women's quota place into the Olympic cross-country race, as a result of the nation's sixteenth-place finish for men and eleventh for women, respectively, in the UCI Olympic Ranking List of 16 May 2021.

Athlete	Event	Time	Rank
Bartłomiej Wawak	Men's cross-country	1:29:10	19
Maja Włoszczowska	Women's cross-country	1:24:25	20

== Equestrian ==
Poland fielded a squad of three equestrian riders into the Olympic team eventing competition by securing an outright berth as the top-ranked nation at the International Equestrian Federation (FEI)-designated Olympic qualifier for Group C (Central and Eastern Europe) in Baborówko.

=== Eventing ===
Jan Kamiński and Jard have been named the traveling alternates. They replaced Paweł Spisak and Banderas as the latter was declared unfit to compete.

Athlete	Horse	Event	Dressage		Cross-country			Jumping						Total	
Athlete	Horse	Event	Dressage		Cross-country			Qualifier			Final			Total	
Athlete	Horse	Event	Penalties	Rank	Penalties	Total	Rank	Penalties	Total	Rank	Penalties	Total	Rank	Penalties	Rank
Małgorzata Cybulska	Chenaro 2	Individual	31.00	18	200.00	Eliminated		8.00	Did not advance						
Joanna Pawlak	Fantastic Frieda	Individual	40.50	55	45.20	85.70	41	100.00	Did not start		Did not advance				
Jan Kamiński	Jard	Individual	33.10	32	12.80	45.90	30	9.20	55.10	29	Did not advance			55.10	29
Małgorzata Cybulska; Joanna Pawlak; Jan Kamiński	See above	Team	104.60	12	258.00	362.60	13	117.20	479.80	13	—N/a			479.80	13

== Fencing ==
Polish fencers qualified a full squad in the women's team épée at the Games by finishing among the top four nations in the FIE Olympic Team Rankings. Meanwhile, Martyna Jelińska claimed a spot in the women's foil by winning the final match at the European Zonal Qualifier in Madrid, Spain.

Athlete	Event	Round of 64	Round of 32	Round of 16	Quarterfinal	Semifinal	Final / BM	
Athlete	Event	Opposition Score	Opposition Score	Opposition Score	Opposition Score	Opposition Score	Opposition Score	Rank
Aleksandra Jarecka	Women's épée	Bye	Kolobova (ROC); W 15–11	Fiamingo (ITA); L 13–15	Did not advance			
Renata Knapik-Miazga	Women's épée	Bye	Kryvytska (UKR); W 15–8	Kong (HKG); L 8–15	Did not advance			
Ewa Trzebińska	Women's épée	Bye	Lehis (EST); L 10–11	Did not advance				
Aleksandra Jarecka; Renata Knapik-Miazga*; Magdalena Piekarska; Ewa Trzebińska	Women's team épée	—N/a			Estonia; L 26–29	Classification semifinal ROC; W 31–25	Fifth place final United States; L 26–33	6
Martyna Jelińska	Women's foil	Proestakis (CHI); W 15–12	Deriglazova (ROC); L 8–15	Did not advance				

== Golf ==
Poland entered one golfer into the Olympic tournament. Adrian Meronk (world no. 189) qualified directly among the top 60 eligible players for the men's event based on the IGF World Rankings of 20 June 2021.

Athlete	Event	Round 1	Round 2	Round 3	Round 4	Total		
Athlete	Event	Score	Score	Score	Score	Score	Par	Rank
Adrian Meronk	Men's	72	71	69	70	282	−2	=51

== Gymnastics ==
=== Artistic ===
Poland entered one artistic gymnast into the Olympic competition. The berth was awarded to the Polish female gymnast, who granted an invitation by FIG to compete in the all-around and apparatus events, as one of the twelve highest-ranked eligible individuals, not yet qualified, at the 2019 World Championships in Stuttgart, Germany.

Women

Athlete	Event	Qualification						Final					
Athlete	Event	Apparatus				Total	Rank	Apparatus				Total	Rank
Athlete	Event	V	UB	BB	F	Total	Rank	V	UB	BB	F	Total	Rank
Gabriela Janik	All-around	13.483	12.966	12.443	11.933	50.932	54	Did not advance					

== Judo ==
Poland qualified six judoka (two men and four women) for each of the following weight classes at the Games. Five of them, highlighted by Rio 2016 Olympian Maciej Sarnacki (men's heavyweight, +100 kg), were selected among the top 18 judoka of their respective weight classes based on the IJF World Ranking List of 28 June 2021, while Piotr Kuczera (men's half-middleweight, 90 kg) accepted a continental berth from Europe as the nation's top-ranked judoka outside of direct qualifying position.

Athlete	Event	Round of 64	Round of 32	Round of 16	Quarterfinals	Semifinals	Repechage	Final / BM	
Athlete	Event	Opposition Result	Opposition Result	Opposition Result	Opposition Result	Opposition Result	Opposition Result	Opposition Result	Rank
Piotr Kuczera	Men's −90 kg	Bye	Bekauri (GEO); L 00–10	Did not advance					
Maciej Sarnacki	Men's +100 kg	—N/a	Kokauri (AZE); L 00–10	Did not advance					
Agata Perenc	Women's –52 kg	—N/a	Pimenta (BRA); L 00–01	Did not advance					
Julia Kowalczyk	Women's –57 kg	—N/a	Karakas (HUN); W 01–00	Monteiro (POR); W 10–00	Klimkait (CAN); L 00–10	Did not advance	Liparteliani (GEO); L 00–01	Did not advance	7
Agata Ozdoba-Błach	Women's –63 kg	—N/a	García (ECU); W 10–00	Tashiro (JPN); W 10–00	Centracchio (ITA); L 00–10	Did not advance	Barrios (VEN); L 00–01	Did not advance	7
Beata Pacut	Women's –78 kg	—N/a	Mazouz (GAB); W 10–00	Hamada (JPN); L 00–10	Did not advance				

== Modern pentathlon ==
Polish athletes qualified for the following spots in the modern pentathlon at the Games. Łukasz Gutkowski secured his selection in the men's event by finishing thirty-eighth overall and fourth among those eligible for Olympic qualification at the 2019 European Championships in Bath, England. Sebastian Stasiak and Rio 2016 Olympian Anna Maliszewska secured more places each on the Polish squad by finishing among the top eight modern pentathletes of their respective individual events vying for qualification in the UIPM World Rankings of 14 June 2021.

Athlete	Event	Fencing (épée one touch)				Swimming (200 m freestyle)			Riding (show jumping)			Combined: shooting/running (10 m air pistol)/(3200 m)			Total points	Final rank
Athlete	Event	RR	BR	Rank	MP points	Time	Rank	MP points	Penalties	Rank	MP points	Time	Rank	MP Points	Total points	Final rank
Łukasz Gutkowski	Men's	19–16	1	12	215	2:00.59	11	309	22	24	278	11:02.50	8	638	1440	12
Sebastian Stasiak	Men's	18–17	0	16	208	2:04.59	25	301	14	13	286	10:55.95	5	645	1440	13
Anna Maliszewska	Women's	18–17	0	17	208	2:17.23	26	276	66	28	234	12:15.02	8	565	1283	20

== Rowing ==
Poland qualified six boats for each of the following rowing classes into the Olympic regatta, with the majority of crews confirming Olympic places for their boats at the 2019 FISA World Championships in Ottensheim, Austria.

Men

Athlete	Event	Heats		Repechage		Semifinals		Final	
Athlete	Event	Time	Rank	Time	Rank	Time	Rank	Time	Rank
Mateusz Biskup; Mirosław Ziętarski	Double sculls	6:11.22	1 SA/B	Bye		6:24.50	3 FA	6:09.17	6
Jerzy Kowalski; Artur Mikołajczewski	Lightweight double sculls	6:31.85	3 R	6:43.44	1 SA/B	6:12.79	4 FB	6:16.01	8
Fabian Barański; Wiktor Chabel; Dominik Czaja; Szymon Pośnik	Quadruple sculls	5:39.25	1 FA	Bye		—N/a		5:34.27	4
Marcin Brzeziński; Mikołaj Burda; Michał Szpakowski; Mateusz Wilangowski	Four	6:03.38	3 R	6:12.52	3 FB	—N/a		5:57.17	7

Women

Athlete	Event	Heats		Repechage		Final	
Athlete	Event	Time	Rank	Time	Rank	Time	Rank
Agnieszka Kobus-Zawojska; Maria Sajdak; Marta Wieliczko; Katarzyna Zillmann	Quadruple sculls	6:18.62	2 FA	Bye		6:11.36	2nd place, silver medalist(s)
Monika Chabel; Joanna Dittmann; Olga Michałkiewicz; Maria Wierzbowska	Four	6:48.33	5 R	6:46.57	2 FA	6:29.95	6

Qualification Legend: FA=Final A (medal); FB=Final B (non-medal); FC=Final C (non-medal); FD=Final D (non-medal); FE=Final E (non-medal); FF=Final F (non-medal); SA/B=Semifinals A/B; SC/D=Semifinals C/D; SE/F=Semifinals E/F; QF=Quarterfinals; R=Repechage

== Sailing ==
Polish sailors qualified one boat in each of the following classes through the 2018 Sailing World Championships, the class-associated Worlds, and the continental regattas.

On 4 March 2020, Polish Yachting Association (Polish: Polski Związek Żeglarski, PZZ) officially nominated the country's first ever 49erFX crew (Łoboda and Melzacka) to compete at the Enoshima regatta. Rio 2016 windsurfer Piotr Myszka, with London 2012 bronze medalist Zofia Noceti-Klepacka, going to her record fourth Games on the women's side, joined the sailing roster two weeks later. Meanwhile, Agnieszka Skrzypulec and Jolanta Ogar, who previously competed for Austria in Rio 2016, secured the women's 470 spot on their second trip together to the rescheduled Games, after being nominated to the Polish team on 11 June 2020. On 31 October 2020, Laser Radial sailor Magdalena Kwaśna was added to the Polish roster for the rescheduled Games based on her scores accumulated at various international regattas stipulated by PYA.

Men

Athlete	Event	Race													Net points	Final rank
Athlete	Event	1	2	3	4	5	6	7	8	9	10	11	12	M*	Net points	Final rank
Piotr Myszka	RS:X	~~11~~	4	6	3	5	11	5	2	5	9	5	2	OCS	79	6
Paweł Kołodziński; Łukasz Przybytek	49er	9	7	15	~~18~~	7	8	7	1	13	17	1	15	4	108	9

Women

Athlete	Event	Race													Net points	Final rank
Athlete	Event	1	2	3	4	5	6	7	8	9	10	11	12	M*	Net points	Final rank
Zofia Noceti-Klepacka	RS:X	4	1	14	~~16~~	16	9	7	8	2	11	7	7	5	96	9
Magdalena Kwaśna	Laser Radial	7	28	18	11	15	18	18	13	25	~~31~~	—N/a		EL	153	17
Jolanta Ogar-Hill; Agnieszka Skrzypulec	470	1	1	2	5	12	1	5	4	~~15~~	15	—N/a		4	54	2nd place, silver medalist(s)
Kinga Łoboda; Aleksandra Melzacka	49erFX	8	14	16	8	5	7	18	15	1	~~20~~	17	19	EL	128	15

M = Medal race; EL = Eliminated – did not advance into the medal race; OCS = On Course Side – On the course side of the starting line at the starting signal and failed to start, or broke WS rules

== Shooting ==
Polish shooters achieved quota places for the following events by virtue of their best finishes at the 2018 ISSF World Championships, the 2019 ISSF World Cup series, European Championships or Games, and European Qualifying Tournament, as long as they obtained a minimum qualifying score (MQS) by 31 May 2020.

Aneta Stankiewicz and Sandra Bernal earned a direct place each in the women's 10 m air rifle and women's trap, respectively, for the rescheduled Games as the highest-ranked shooter vying for qualification in the ISSF World Olympic Rankings of 6 June 2021.

Athlete	Event	Qualification		Semifinal		Final	
Athlete	Event	Points	Rank	Points	Rank	Points	Rank
Tomasz Bartnik	Men's 10 m air rifle	625.4	23	—N/a		Did not advance	
Tomasz Bartnik	Men's 50 m rifle 3 positions	1171	15	—N/a		Did not advance	
Sandra Bernal	Women's trap	119	9	—N/a		Did not advance	
Klaudia Breś	Women's 10 m air pistol	571	21	—N/a		Did not advance	
Klaudia Breś	Women's 25 m pistol	578	24	—N/a		Did not advance	
Aleksandra Jarmolińska	Women's skeet	114	19	—N/a		Did not advance	
Aneta Stankiewicz	Women's 10 m air rifle	626.8	15	—N/a		Did not advance	
Aneta Stankiewicz	Women's 50 m rifle 3 positions	1167	16	—N/a		Did not advance	
Tomasz Bartnik; Aneta Stankiewicz	Mixed 10 m air rifle team	630.8	2 Q	414.0	8	Did not advance	

== Skateboarding ==
Poland entered one skateboarder to compete in the women's park into the Olympic tournament. With the cancellation of the 2021 World Park Championships, Amelia Brodka accepted an invitation from the World Skate, as one of the top-four skateboarders outside the World Rankings of 30 June 2021.

Athlete	Event	Qualification		Final	
Athlete	Event	Score	Rank	Score	Rank
Amelia Brodka	Women's park	20.17	17	Did not advance	

== Sport climbing ==
Poland entered one sport climber into the Olympic tournament. Aleksandra Miroslaw qualified directly for the women's combined event, by advancing to the final stage and securing one of the seven provisional berths at the 2019 IFSC World Championships in Hachioji, Japan.

Athlete	Event	Qualification									Final								
Athlete	Event	Speed		Boulder		Lead			Total	Rank	Speed		Boulder		Lead			Total	Rank
Athlete	Event	Best	Place	Result	Place	Hold	Time	Place	Total	Rank	Best	Place	Result	Place	Hold	Time	Place	Total	Rank
Aleksandra Mirosław	Women's	6.97 OR	1	0T0z 0 0	20	12	-	19	380.00	7 Q	6.84 WR	1	0T0z 0 0	8	9+	-	8	64	4

== Swimming ==
Polish swimmers further achieved qualifying standards in the following events (up to a maximum of 2 swimmers in each event at the Olympic Qualifying Time (OQT), and potentially 1 at the Olympic Selection Time (OST)): To assure their selection to the Olympic team, swimmers must attain the Olympic qualifying cut in their respective individual pool events at various local and international meets approved by FINA between 1 February – 31 May 2021, including the Polish Championships in Lublin (30 April to 2 May).

Twenty-three swimmers (16 men and 7 women) were named to the Polish roster for the Olympics at the end of the federation's qualifying window, with sprint butterfly ace Paweł Korzeniowski racing in the pool at his fifth consecutive Games.

The team was reduced to seventeen swimmers (13 men and 4 women) before the Games because of various procedural errors by the Polish Swimming Federation. Alicja Tchórz, Bartosz Piszczorowicz, Aleksandra Polańska, Mateusz Chowaniec, Dominika Kossakowska, and Jan Hołub arrived in Japan and were informed that they did not qualify for their respective events either through OQT or OST, prompting them to return home.

Men

Athlete	Event	Heat		Semifinal		Final	
Athlete	Event	Time	Rank	Time	Rank	Time	Rank
Krzysztof Chmielewski	200 m butterfly	1:55.77	13 Q	1:55.29	7 Q	1:55.88	8
Konrad Czerniak	50 m freestyle	22.33	31	Did not advance			
Paweł Juraszek	50 m freestyle	21.97	=15 Q	21.88	14	Did not advance	
Radosław Kawęcki	200 m backstroke	1:56.83	6 Q	1:56.68	7 Q	1:56.39	6
Paweł Korzeniowski	100 m butterfly	52.00	22	Did not advance			
Jakub Majerski	100 m butterfly	50.97 NR	3 Q	51.24	7 Q	50.92 NR	=5
Jakub Majerski	200 m butterfly	1:57.91	27	Did not advance			
Jakub Skierka	200 m backstroke	1:59.30	27	Did not advance			
Kacper Stokowski	100 m backstroke	53.99	23	Did not advance			
Konrad Czerniak; Jakub Kraska; Kacper Majchrzak; Karol Ostrowski	4 × 100 m freestyle relay	3:13.88 NR	11	—N/a		Did not advance	
Radosław Kawęcki; Jakub Kraska; Kacper Majchrzak; Kamil Sieradzki	4 × 200 m freestyle relay	7:18.91	15	—N/a		Did not advance	
Jan Kozakiewicz; Jakub Kraska; Jakub Majerski; Kacper Stokowski	4 × 100 m medley relay	3:32.62 NR	9	—N/a		Did not advance	

Women

Athlete	Event	Heat		Semifinal		Final	
Athlete	Event	Time	Rank	Time	Rank	Time	Rank
Laura Bernat	200 m backstroke	2:10.37	13 Q	2:12.86	14	Did not advance	
Katarzyna Wasick	50 m freestyle	24.31	5 Q	24.26	5 Q	24.32	=5

Mixed

Athlete	Event	Heat		Final	
Athlete	Event	Time	Rank	Time	Rank
Kornelia Fiedkiewicz; Jan Kozakiewicz; Jakub Majerski; Paulina Peda	4 × 100 m medley relay	DSQ		Did not advance	

== Table tennis ==
Poland entered three athletes into the table tennis competition at the Games. The women's team secured a berth by advancing to the quarterfinal round of the 2020 World Olympic Qualification Event in Gondomar, Portugal, permitting a maximum of two starters to compete in the women's singles tournament.

Athlete	Event	Preliminary	Round 1	Round 2	Round 3	Round of 16	Quarterfinals	Semifinals	Final / BM	
Athlete	Event	Opposition Result	Opposition Result	Opposition Result	Opposition Result	Opposition Result	Opposition Result	Opposition Result	Opposition Result	Rank
Li Qian	Women's singles	Bye		Lay (AUS); L 2–4	Did not advance					
Natalia Partyka	Women's singles	Bye	Bromley (AUS); W 4–0	Meshref (EGY); L 2–4	Did not advance					
Natalia Bajor; Li Qian; Natalia Partyka	Women's team	—N/a				South Korea; L 0–3	Did not advance			

== Taekwondo ==
Poland entered two athletes into the taekwondo competition at the Games. With the Grand Slam winner already qualified through the WT Olympic Rankings, Aleksandra Kowalczuk secured a spot in the women's heavyweight category (+67 kg), as the next highest-ranked eligible taekwondo practitioner. Meanwhile, Patrycja Adamkiewicz scored a semifinal victory in the women's lightweight category (57 kg) to book the remaining spot on the Polish taekwondo squad at the 2021 European Qualification Tournament in Sofia, Bulgaria.

Athlete	Event	Qualification Contest	Round of 16	Quarterfinals	Semifinals	Repechage	Final / BM	
Athlete	Event	Opposition Result	Opposition Result	Opposition Result	Opposition Result	Opposition Result	Opposition Result	Rank
Patrycja Adamkiewicz	Women's –57 kg	Bye	Zhou Lj (CHN); L 17–31	Did not advance				
Aleksandra Kowalczuk	Women's +67 kg	—N/a	Stewart (AUS); W 7–2	Mandić (SRB); L 4–11	Did not advance	Ogallo (KEN); W 15–7	Walkden (GBR); L 4–11	5

== Tennis ==
Poland entered six tennis players (three men and three women) into the Olympic tournament. Hubert Hurkacz (world no. 17) qualified directly as one of the top 56 eligible players in the ATP World Rankings, with Kamil Majchrzak (world no. 112) receiving an additional spot after one of the original entrants withdrew from the men's singles. Rio 2016 Olympian Magda Linette (world no. 44), and rookie Iga Świątek (world no. 9) did so for the women's singles based on their WTA World Rankings of 13 June 2021. Having been directly entered to the singles, Hurkacz and Linette opted to play with their partners Łukasz Kubot and Alicja Rosolska in the men's and women's doubles, respectively.

Athlete	Event	Round of 64	Round of 32	Round of 16	Quarterfinals	Semifinals	Final / BM	
Athlete	Event	Opposition Score	Opposition Score	Opposition Score	Opposition Score	Opposition Score	Opposition Score	Rank
Hubert Hurkacz	Men's singles	Saville (AUS); W 6–2, 6–4	Broady (GBR); L 5–7, 6–3, 3–6	Did not advance				
Kamil Majchrzak	Men's singles	Kecmanović (SRB); L 4–6, 2–6	Did not advance					
Hubert Hurkacz; Łukasz Kubot	Men's doubles	—N/a	Struff / Zverev (GER); L 2–6, 6–7^{(5–7)}	Did not advance				
Magda Linette	Women's singles	Sabalenka (BLR); L 2–6, 1–6	Did not advance					
Iga Świątek	Women's singles	Barthel (GER); W 6–2, 6–2	Badosa (ESP); L 3–6, 6–7^{(4–7)}	Did not advance				
Magda Linette; Alicja Rosolska	Women's doubles	—N/a	Mattek-Sands / Pegula (USA); L 1–6, 3–6	Did not advance				
Iga Świątek; Łukasz Kubot	Mixed Doubles	—N/a		Ferro / Herbert (FRA); W 6–3, 7–6^{(7–3)}	Vesnina / Karatsev (ROC); L 4–6, 4–6	Did not advance		

== Volleyball ==
=== Beach ===
==== Men's tournament ====
Two Polish men's beach volleyball pairs qualified directly for the Olympics by virtue of their nation's top 15 placement in the FIVB Olympic Rankings of 13 June 2021.

Athlete	Event	Preliminary round				Lucky loser playoffs	Round of 16	Quarterfinals	Semifinals	Final / BM	
Athlete	Event	Opposition Score	Opposition Score	Opposition Score	Standing	Opposition Score	Opposition Score	Opposition Score	Opposition Score	Opposition Score	Rank
Michał Bryl; Grzegorz Fijałek	Men's	Evandro / Schmidt (BRA); L (19–21, 21–14, 15–17)	E Grimalt / M Grimalt (CHI); W (21–17, 21–18)	Abicha / El Graoui (MAR); W (21–17, 21–11)	2 Q	—N/a	Lupo / Nicolai (ITA); L (20–22, 18–21)	Did not advance			
Piotr Kantor; Bartosz Łosiak	Men's	Ishijima / Shiratori (JPN); W (21–15, 21–14)	Thole / Wickler (GER); L (20–22, 16–21)	Lupo / Nicolai (ITA); L (19–21, 21–17, 10–15)	3 q	Gavira / Herrera (ESP); L (29–31, 21–19, 7–15)	Did not advance				

=== Indoor ===
Summary

Team	Event	Group stage						Quarterfinal	Semifinal	Final / BM	
Team	Event	Opposition Score	Opposition Score	Opposition Score	Opposition Score	Opposition Score	Rank	Opposition Score	Opposition Score	Opposition Score	Rank
Poland men's	Men's tournament	Iran; L 2–3	Italy; W 3–0	Venezuela; W 3–1	Japan; W 3–0	Canada; W 3–0	1	France; L 2–3	Did not advance		

==== Men's tournament ====
Poland men's volleyball team qualified for the Olympics by securing an outright berth as the highest-ranked nation for pool D at the Intercontinental Olympic Qualification Tournament in Gdańsk.

Team roster

The Poland roster was announced on 27 June 2021.

Head coach: (Belgium) Vital Heynen

- 1 Piotr Nowakowski MB
- 5 Łukasz Kaczmarek OP
- 6 Bartosz Kurek OP
- 9 Wilfredo León OH
- 11 Fabian Drzyzga S
- 12 Grzegorz Łomacz S
- 13 Michał Kubiak (c) OH
- 14 Aleksander Śliwka OH
- 15 Jakub Kochanowski MB
- 16 Kamil Semeniuk OH
- 17 Paweł Zatorski L
- 20 Mateusz Bieniek MB

Group play

Pos	Team	Pld	W	L	Pts	SW	SL	SR	SPW	SPL	SPR	Qualification
1	Poland	5	4	1	13	14	4	3.500	435	365	1.192	Quarterfinals
2	Italy	5	4	1	11	12	7	1.714	447	411	1.088	Quarterfinals
3	Japan (H)	5	3	2	8	10	9	1.111	437	433	1.009	Quarterfinals
4	Canada	5	2	3	7	9	9	1.000	396	387	1.023	Quarterfinals
5	Iran	5	2	3	6	9	11	0.818	453	460	0.985	
6	Venezuela	5	0	5	0	1	15	0.067	281	393	0.715	

Source: Tokyo 2020 and FIVB
Rules for classification: Tiebreakers
(H) Host

24 July 2021; 19:40 v	Poland	2–3	Iran	Ariake Arena, Tokyo; Referees: Daniele Rapisarda (ITA), Juraj Mokrý (SVK)
24 July 2021; 19:40 v	(25–18, 22–25, 22–25, 25–22, 21–23); Results Statistics			Ariake Arena, Tokyo; Referees: Daniele Rapisarda (ITA), Juraj Mokrý (SVK)

26 July 2021; 14:20 v	Poland	3–0	Italy	Ariake Arena, Tokyo; Referees: Paulo Turci (BRA), Denny Cespedes (DOM)
26 July 2021; 14:20 v	(25–20, 26–24, 25–20); Results Statistics			Ariake Arena, Tokyo; Referees: Paulo Turci (BRA), Denny Cespedes (DOM)

28 July 2021; 17:15 v	Poland	3–1	Venezuela	Ariake Arena, Tokyo; Referees: Hamid Al-Rousi (UAE), Shin Muranaka (JPN)
28 July 2021; 17:15 v	(25–16, 25–13, 18–25, 25–15); Results Statistics			Ariake Arena, Tokyo; Referees: Hamid Al-Rousi (UAE), Shin Muranaka (JPN)

30 July 2021; 14:20 v	Japan	0–3	Poland	Ariake Arena, Tokyo; Referees: Hernán Casamiquela (ARG), Liu Jiang (CHN)
30 July 2021; 14:20 v	(22–25, 21–25, 24–26); Results Statistics			Ariake Arena, Tokyo; Referees: Hernán Casamiquela (ARG), Liu Jiang (CHN)

1 August 2021; 09:00 v	Poland	3–0	Canada	Ariake Arena, Tokyo; Referees: Paulo Turci (BRA), Hamid Al-Rousi (UAE)
1 August 2021; 09:00 v	(25–15, 25–21, 25–16); Results Statistics			Ariake Arena, Tokyo; Referees: Paulo Turci (BRA), Hamid Al-Rousi (UAE)

Quarterfinal

3 August 2021; 21:30 v	Poland	2–3	France	Ariake Arena, Tokyo; Referees: Juraj Mokrý (SVK), Daniele Rapisarda (ITA)
3 August 2021; 21:30 v	(25–21, 22–25, 25–21, 21–25, 9–15); Results Statistics			Ariake Arena, Tokyo; Referees: Juraj Mokrý (SVK), Daniele Rapisarda (ITA)

== Weightlifting ==
Poland entered three weightlifters (two men and one woman) into the Olympic competition. Rio 2016 Olympian Arkadiusz Michalski finished fifth of the eight entrants in the men's 109 kg category based on the IWF Absolute World Rankings, with Bartłomiej Adamus (men's 96 kg) and Joanna Łochowska (women's 55 kg) topping the field of weightlifters vying for qualification from Europe in their respective weight categories based on the IWF Absolute Continental Rankings.

Athlete	Event	Snatch		Clean & Jerk		Total	Rank
Athlete	Event	Result	Rank	Result	Rank	Total	Rank
Bartłomiej Adamus	Men's –96 kg	163	9	197	9	360	7
Arkadiusz Michalski	Men's –109 kg	175	10	216	7	391	7
Joanna Łochowska	Women's –55 kg	84	10	102	11	186	10

== Wrestling ==
Poland qualified six wrestlers for each of the following classes into the Olympic competition. Three of them finished among the top six to book Olympic spots in the men's Greco-Roman 97 kg and women's freestyle (53 and 57 kg) at the 2019 World Championships, while an additional license was awarded to the Polish wrestler, who progressed to the top two finals of the men's freestyle 65 kg at the 2021 World Qualification Tournament in Sofia, Bulgaria.

On 19 December 2019, United World Wrestling awarded an additional Olympic license to Poland in men's freestyle 74 kg, as a response to the doping violations on the French wrestler at the World Championships. On 30 June 2021, the Polish wrestling team accepted a spare license previously allocated by Sweden in the women's freestyle 68 kg, upgrading it to a total of six wrestlers.

Key:

- VT (ranking points: 5–0 or 0–5) – Victory by fall.
- VB (ranking points: 5–0 or 0–5) – Victory by injury (VF for forfeit, VA for withdrawal or disqualification)
- PP (ranking points: 3–1 or 1–3) – Decision by points – the loser with technical points.
- PO (ranking points: 3–0 or 0–3) – Decision by points – the loser without technical points.
- ST (ranking points: 4–0 or 0–4) – Great superiority – the loser without technical points and a margin of victory of at least 8 (Greco-Roman) or 10 (freestyle) points.
- SP (ranking points: 4–1 or 1–4) – Technical superiority – the loser with technical points and a margin of victory of at least 8 (Greco-Roman) or 10 (freestyle) points.

Freestyle

Athlete	Event	Round of 16	Quarterfinal	Semifinal	Repechage	Final / BM	
Athlete	Event	Opposition Result	Opposition Result	Opposition Result	Opposition Result	Opposition Result	Rank
Magomedmurad Gadzhiev	Men's −65 kg	Pilidis (GRE); W 4–0 ^{ST}	Rashidov (ROC); L 1–3 ^{PP}	Did not advance			7
Kamil Rybicki	Men's −74 kg	Hussen (EGY); L 1–3 ^{PP}	Did not advance				13
Roksana Zasina	Women's −53 kg	Akhmetova (KAZ); W 3–1 ^{PP}	Mukaida (JPN); L 1–4 ^{SP}	Did not advance	Essombe (CMR); L 1–3 ^{PP}	Did not advance	7
Jowita Wrzesień	Women's −57 kg	Nikolova (BUL); L 0–3 ^{PO}	Did not advance				16
Agnieszka Wieszczek	Women's −68 kg	Cherkasova (UKR); L 0–4 ^{ST}	Did not advance				16

Greco-Roman

Athlete	Event	Round of 16	Quarterfinal	Semifinal	Repechage	Final / BM	
Athlete	Event	Opposition Result	Opposition Result	Opposition Result	Opposition Result	Opposition Result	Rank
Tadeusz Michalik	Men's −97 kg	Achouri (TUN); W 4–0 ^{ST}	Hancock (USA); W 3–1 ^{PP}	Evloev (ROC); L 1–3 ^{PP}	Bye	Szőke (HUN); W 4–0 ^{ST}	3rd place, bronze medalist(s)
