= 2019 FIBA 3x3 World Cup =

Wereldkampioenschap 3×3-basketbal 2019

Tournament details
- Host country: Netherlands
- City: Amsterdam
- Dates: 18–23 June 2019
- Teams: 40

The 2019 FIBA 3x3 World Cup, hosted by the Netherlands, was an international 3x3 basketball event that featured separate competitions for men's and women's national teams. The tournament ran between 18 and 23 June 2019 in Amsterdam, North Holland.

== Background ==
It was announced in February 2017 that the Netherlands would host the event and that the tournament would be held at Museumplein, one of Amsterdam's public squares. Tickets for the event went on sale in March 2019.

== Medalists ==
Event	Gold	Silver	Bronze
Men's team Details	United States; Canyon Barry; Damon Huffman; Robbie Hummel; Kareem Maddox	Latvia; Agnis Čavars; Edgars Krūmiņš; Kārlis Lasmanis; Nauris Miezis	Poland; Michael Hicks; Paweł Pawłowski; Marcin Sroka; Przemysław Zamojski
Women's team Details	China; Jiang Jiayin; Li Yingyun; Wu Di; Zhang Zhiting	Hungary; Cyesha Goree; Dóra Medgyessy; Klaudia Papp; Alexandra Theodoreán	France; Ana Maria Filip; Laëtitia Guapo; Marie-Eve Paget; Migna Touré
Skills contest Details	(France) Marie Eve Paget (FRA)	(Italy) Rae Lin D'Alie (ITA)	(Iran) Shadi Abdolvand (IRI)
Dunk contest Details	(Ukraine) Vadym Poddubchenko (UKR)	(Poland) Piotr Grabowski (POL)	(Latvia) Kristaps Dārgais (LAT)
Shoot-out contest (mixed); Details	(Latvia) Edgars Krūmiņš (LAT)	(Ukraine) Stanislav Tymofeyenko (UKR)	(Italy) Marcella Filippi (ITA)

== Participating teams ==
The FIBA 3x3 Federation Ranking on 13 December 2018 was used as basis to determine the participating FIBA member associations. The hosts, the Netherlands, qualified automatically for both the men's and women's events, while the defending champions, Serbia for men's and Italy for women's, also qualified automatically. Thereafter, the next 15 teams in both the men's and women's tournaments qualified on the basis of the Federation Rankings.

=== Main tournaments ===
==== Men ====
Pool A

- Serbia
- United States
- Netherlands
- Turkey
- South Korea

Pool B

- Russia
- Mongolia
- Ukraine
- Estonia
- Puerto Rico

Pool C

- Slovenia
- China
- Lithuania
- Qatar
- France

Pool D

- Japan
- Latvia
- Brazil
- Poland
- Australia

==== Women ====
Pool A

- China
- Netherlands
- Hungary
- Latvia
- Turkmenistan

Pool B

- France
- Japan
- Switzerland
- Australia
- Andorra

Pool C

- Mongolia
- Romania
- Iran
- Czech Republic
- Spain

Pool D

- Russia
- Ukraine
- Indonesia
- Italy
- New Zealand

=== Individual contests ===
==== Skills contest ====
- Andorra (1)
- France (1)
- Indonesia (1)
- Iran (1)
- Italy (1)
- Latvia (1)
- Mongolia (1)
- Netherlands (1)
- New Zealand (1)
- Russia (1)
- Spain (1)
- Switzerland (1)
- Turkmenistan (1)
- Ukraine (1)

==== Shoot-out contest ====
- Andorra (1)
- Australia (2)
- Brazil (1)
- China (2)
- Czech Republic (1)
- Estonia (1)
- France (2)
- Hungary (1)
- Indonesia (1)
- Iran (1)
- Italy (1)
- Japan (2)
- South Korea (1)
- Latvia (2)
- Lithuania (1)
- Mongolia (2)
- Netherlands (2)
- New Zealand (1)
- Poland (1)
- Puerto Rico (1)
- Qatar (1)
- Russia (2)
- Serbia (1)
- Slovenia (1)
- Spain (1)
- Switzerland (1)
- Turkey (1)
- Turkmenistan (1)
- Ukraine (1)
- United States (1)
