= Syria at the 2018 Asian Games =

- IOC code: SYR
- NOC: Syrian Olympic Committee
- Website: www.syriaolymp.org

in Jakarta and Palembang August 18 – September 2
- Competitors: 57 in 15 sports
- Flag bearer: Abdulwahab Al-Hamwi
- Medals Ranked 37th: Gold 0 Silver 0 Bronze 1 Total 1

Asian Games appearances (overview)
- 1951; 1954; 1958; 1962; 1966; 1970; 1974; 1978; 1982; 1986; 1990; 1994; 1998; 2002; 2006; 2010; 2014; 2018; 2022; 2026

Syria competed at the 2018 Asian Games in Jakarta and Palembang, Indonesia, from 18 August to 2 September 2018.

== Medalists ==
The following Syrian competitors won medals at the Games.

Medal	Name	Sport	Event	Date
Bronze	Majd Eddin Ghazal	Athletics	Men's high jump	27 Aug

Medals by sport
Sport	1st place, gold medalist(s)	2nd place, silver medalist(s)	3rd place, bronze medalist(s)	Total
Athletics	0	0	1	1
Total	0	0	0	1

== Competitors ==
The following is a list of the number of competitors representing Syria that will participate at the Games:

Sport	Men	Women	Total
Athletics	1	0	1
Basketball	12	4	16
Boxing	2	0	2
Cycling	2	1	3
Equestrian	2	0	2
Football	20	0	20
Gymnastics	1	0	1
Ju-jitsu	2	0	2
Judo	1^{[a]}	0	1
Kurash	1	1	2
Sambo	1	1	2
Swimming	1	0	1
Triathlon	2	0	2
Weightlifting	1	0	1
Wrestling	2	0	2
Total	50	7	57

^{a} Athlete who also competed in Kurash.

== Athletics ==
Field events

Athletes	Event	Qualification		Final	
Athletes	Event	Result	Rank	Result	Rank
Majd Eddin Ghazal	High Jump	2.15	7 q	2.24	= (bronze)

== Basketball ==
Summary

Team	Event	Group stage						Quarterfinal	Semifinals / Pl.	Final / BM / Pl.	
Team	Event	Opposition Score	Opposition Score	Opposition Score	Opposition Score	Opposition Score	Rank	Opposition Score	Opposition Score	Opposition Score	Rank
Syria men's	Men's tournament	—N/a				Iran; L 55−68	2 Q	Chinese Taipei; L 75−82	Indonesia; W 76−66	Philippines; L 55−109	6
Syria Men's 3x3	Men's 3x3 tournament	Jordan; W 21−19	Maldives; W DSQ	Qatar; L 7−17	Nepal; W 21−19	Japan; L 13−21	3	Did not advance			
Syria women's 3x3	Women's 3x3 tournament	—N/a		Indonesia; L 15−16	South Korea; L 15−16	Sri Lanka; L 12−15	4	Did not advance			

=== 5x5 basketball ===
Syria men's team entered the competition and drawn in the group B. The team definitely qualified to the next round after United Arab Emirates left the group.

==== Men's tournament ====
Roster

The following is the Syria roster in the men's basketball tournament of the 2018 Asian Games.

Syria men's national basketball team - 2018 Asian Games roster
Players
Coaches

Pos.	No.	Name	Age – Date of birth	Height	Club	Ctr.
F	00	Khalil Khouri	20 – 6 June 1998	1.95 m (6 ft 5 in)	Al-Jaish	(Syria)
F	1	Anthouny Bakar	24 – 10 January 1994	1.97 m (6 ft 6 in)	Al-Ittihad	(Syria)
G	8	Ahmad Khyyata	19 – 17 June 1999	1.87 m (6 ft 2 in)	Al-Jaish	(Syria)
F	9	Tarek Aljabi	28 – 2 August 1990	1.83 m (6 ft 0 in)	Al-Jaish	(Syria)
G	11	Jamil Saddir	29 – 13 January 1989	2.00 m (6 ft 7 in)	Al Wahda	(Syria)
C	12	Abdulwahab Al-Hamwi	28 – 15 June 1990	2.18 m (7 ft 2 in)	Al-Jaish	(Syria)
G	13	Sharif Al Osh	30 – 14 March 1988	1.85 m (6 ft 1 in)	Al Wahda	(Syria)
F	14	Omar Idelbi	19 – 13 July 1999	1.90 m (6 ft 3 in)	Al Thawra	(Syria)
G	15	Mhd Ammar Al Ghamian	17 – 25 February 2001	2.03 m (6 ft 8 in)
C	21	Omar Al-Shaikh	18 – 30 November 1999	2.04 m (6 ft 8 in)	Al-Jaish	(Syria)
C	41	Mohi Eddin Kasaballi (C)	34 – 18 May 1984	2.10 m (6 ft 11 in)	Al Sharjah	(United Arab Emirates)
G	99	Nazem Kassas	18 – 16 January 2000	1.86 m (6 ft 1 in)	Al-Ittihad	(Syria)

Head coach

- (Serbia) Veselin Matić

Assistant coach(es)

- (Syria) George Shakar

Legend

- (C) Team captain
- (NP) Naturalized player
- Club - describes last
  club before the tournament
- Age - describes age
  on 14 August 2018

Group B

Pos	Team	Pld	W	L	PF	PA	PD	Pts	Qualification
1	Iran	1	1	0	68	55	+13	2	Quarterfinals
2	Syria	1	0	1	55	68	−13	1	Quarterfinals

Source: OCA

25 August
10:00

Syria	55–68	Iran
Scoring by quarter: 9–16, 15–14, 14–22, 17–16
Pts: Al-Hamwi 19; Rebs: Al-Hamwi 10; Asts: Bakar, Saddir 3		Pts: Mashayekhi 17; Rebs: Haddadi, Kazemi 10; Asts: Mashayekhi 6

Gelora Bung Karno Basketball Hall, Jakarta
Referees: Ferdinand Pascual (PHI), Imran Ali Baig (IND), Budi Marfan (INA)

Quarter-final

27 August
16:00

Chinese Taipei	82–75	Syria
Scoring by quarter: 24–19, 17–22, 16–17, 25–17
Pts: Chen Y. 24; Rebs: Chou P. 7 Asts: Creighton 4		Pts: Al-Jabi 28; Rebs: Al-Hamwi 11; Asts: Al-Hamwi 5

Gelora Bung Karno Basketball Hall, Jakarta
Referees: Ferdinand Pascual (PHI), Kumiko Kumagai (JPN), Hadi Salem (IRI)

5th–8th classification

28 August
18:30

Syria	76–66	Indonesia
Scoring by quarter: 26–15, 26–9, 14–17, 10–25
Pts: Al-Jabi 33; Rebs: Al-Shaikh 11; Asts: Bakar, Al-Osh 4		Pts: Prawiro, Wisnu 14; Rebs: Johnson 7 Asts: Johnson 4

Gelora Bung Karno Basketball Hall, Jakarta
Referees: Hadi Salem (IRI), Alexey Stepanenko (KAZ), Imran Ali Baig (IND)

Fifth place game

31 August
18:30

Philippines	109–55	Syria
Scoring by quarter: 38–16, 22–18, 31–10, 18–11
Pts: Clarkson 29; Rebs: Standhardinger 15; Asts: Ahanmisi 7		Pts: Al-Jabi 23; Rebs: Al-Hamwi, Al-Osh 6 Asts: Al-Osh 4

Istora Gelora Bung Karno, Jakarta
Referees: Harja Jaladri (INA), Alexey Stepanenko (KAZ), Haryanto Sutaryo (INA)

=== 3x3 basketball ===
Syria also set a men's and women's team that competed in the 3-on-3 basketball. The men's team placed in the pool C while the women's team in the pool D based on the FIBA 3x3 federation ranking.

==== Men's tournament ====
Roster

The following is the Syria roster in the men's 3x3 basketball tournament of the 2018 Asian Games.

- Mhd Ammar Al Ghamian
- Omar Idelbi
- Khalil Khouri
- Ahmad Khyyata

Pool C

Pos	Team	Pld	W	L	PF	PA	PD	Qualification
1	Japan	5	5	0	86	46	+40	Quarterfinals
2	Qatar	5	4	1	74	43	+31	Quarterfinals
3	Syria	5	3	2	62	76	−14	
4	Nepal	5	2	3	59	74	−15	
5	Jordan	5	1	4	43	85	−42	
—	Maldives	5	0	5	0	0	0	

Source: OCA

21 August
17:30

Jordan	19–21	Syria
Pts: Juha 7		Pts: Khouri 8

Gelora Bung Karno Tennis Center Court, Jakarta
Referees: Shi (CHN), Quinn (INA)

21 August
19:40

Syria	vs.	Maldives
Forfeit

Gelora Bung Karno Tennis Center Court, Jakarta

21 August
19:40

Qatar	17–7	Syria
Pts: Dieng 6		Pts: Idelbi 3

Gelora Bung Karno Tennis Center Court, Jakarta
Referees: Quinn (INA), Ibragimow (TKM)

24 August
15:40

Syria	21–19	Nepal
Pts: Khouri 7		Pts: Basnet 9

Gelora Bung Karno Tennis Center Court, Jakarta
Referees: Liu (MAS), Quinn (INA)

24 August
17:30

Japan	21–13	Syria
Pts: Matsuwaki 17		Pts: Khouri 6

Gelora Bung Karno Tennis Center Court, Jakarta
Referees: Rulyov (KAZ), Tan (SGP)

==== Women's tournament ====
Roster

The following is the Syria roster in the women's 3x3 basketball tournament of the 2018 Asian Games.

- Farah Assad
- Noura Bshara
- Johna Mbayed
- Cedra Sulaiman

Pool D

Pos	Team	Pld	W	L	PF	PA	PD	Qualification
1	South Korea	3	3	0	59	32	+27	Quarterfinals
2	Indonesia	3	2	1	46	46	0	Quarterfinals
3	Sri Lanka	3	1	2	32	54	−22	
4	Syria	3	0	3	42	47	−5	

Source: OCA

22 August
19:40

Indonesia	16–15	Syria
Pts: Sriartha 8		Pts: Sulaiman 8

Gelora Bung Karno Tennis Center Court, Jakarta
Referees: Al-Harthi (OMA), Ito (JPN)

22 August
20:50

Syria	15–16	South Korea
Pts: Assad 7		Pts: Choi 7

Gelora Bung Karno Tennis Center Court, Jakarta
Referees: Al-Harthi (OMA), Tan (SGP)

25 August
16:50

Sri Lanka	15–12	Syria
Pts: Thathsarani 6		Pts: Bshara 7

Gelora Bung Karno Tennis Center Court, Jakarta
Referees: Shi (CHN), Tan (SGP)

== Boxing ==
Men

Athlete	Event	Round of 32	Round of 16	Quarterfinals	Semifinals	Final	Rank
Athlete	Event	Opposition Result	Opposition Result	Opposition Result	Opposition Result	Opposition Result	Rank
Abdul Mouen Azziz	–69 kg	Bye	Lim H-c (KOR); L 0–5	Did not advance			
Ahmad Ghosoun	–75 kg	Bye	S Mousavi (IRI); L 0–5	Did not advance			

== Cycling ==
=== Road ===
Athlete	Event	Final	
Athlete	Event	Time	Rank
Yousef Srouji	Men's road race	3:29:56	27
Yousef Srouji	Men's time trial	DNS	—
Roba Helane	Women's time trial	DNS	—

=== Track ===
Pursuit

Athlete	Event	Qualification		Final	
Athlete	Event	Time	Rank	Opposition Time	Rank
Tarek Al-Moakee	Men's pursuit	5:04.425	14	Did not advance	

Qualification legend: FA=Gold medal final; FB=Bronze medal final

Omnium

Athlete	Event	Scratch race		Tempo race		Elimination race		Points race		Total points	Rank
Athlete	Event	Rank	Points	Rank	Points	Rank	Points	Rank	Points	Total points	Rank
Tarek Al-Moakee	Men's omnium	15	12	17	−20	17	8	15	−17	11	16

== Equestrian ==
Jumping

Athlete	Horse	Event	Qualification		Qualifier 1			Qualifier 2 Team Final			Final round A			Final round B		
Athlete	Horse	Event	Points	Rank	Penalties	Total	Rank	Penalties	Total	Rank	Penalties	Total	Rank	Penalties	Total	Rank
Ahmad Saber Hamcho	Cartagena 17	Individual	3.30	11	4	7.30	16 Q	0	7.30	12 Q	8	15.30	12 Q	1	16.30	9
Mohamad Joubarani	Etos HBC	Individual	23.85	62	13	36.85	56	Did not advance								

== Football ==
Syria drawn in the group C at the men's football event.

Summary

Team	Event	Group stage				Round of 16	Quarterfinal	Semifinal	Final / BM	
Team	Event	Opposition Score	Opposition Score	Opposition Score	Rank	Opposition Score	Opposition Score	Opposition Score	Opposition Score	Rank
Syria men's	Men's tournament	United Arab Emirates; W 1–0	China; L 0–3	Timor-Leste; W 5–2	2 Q	Palestine; W 1–0	Vietnam; L 0–1	did not advance		6

=== Men's tournament ===
Roster

The following is the Syria squad in the men's football tournament of the 2018 Asian Games.

Head coach: Muhannad Al Fakeer

No.	Pos.	Player	Date of birth (age)	Club
1	GK	Ahmad Madania* (captain)	1 January 1990 (aged 28)	(Syrian Football Association) Al-Jaish
2	MF	Hussain Al Shouaeeb*	2 January 1992 (aged 26)	(Syrian Football Association) Al-Jaish
3	DF	Youssef Al Hamwi	1 February 1997 (aged 21)	(Syrian Football Association) Al-Jaish
4	DF	Jihad Besmar	10 January 1996 (aged 22)	(Syrian Football Association) Al-Karamah
5	DF	Fares Arnaout	31 January 1997 (aged 21)	(Syrian Football Association) Al-Jaish
6	MF	Ahmed Ashkar	1 January 1996 (aged 22)	(Syrian Football Association) Al-Jaish
7	FW	Mahmoud Al Baher*	3 January 1994 (aged 24)	(Syrian Football Association) Tishreen
8	MF	Mouhamad Anez	14 May 1995 (aged 23)	(Syrian Football Association) Al-Jaish
9	FW	Ahmad Al Khassi	27 January 1999 (aged 19)	(Syrian Football Association) Al-Jaish
10	MF	Mohammad Marmour	4 January 1995 (aged 23)	(Syrian Football Association) Tishreen
12	DF	Ahmad Al Ghalab	2 January 1996 (aged 22)	(Syrian Football Association) Al-Muhafaza
13	FW	Kamel Koaeh	1 January 1998 (aged 20)	(Syrian Football Association) Al-Shorta
14	DF	Abdullah Jinat	18 January 1996 (aged 22)	(Syrian Football Association) Al-Karamah
15	DF	Khaled Kurdaghli	31 January 1997 (aged 21)	(Syrian Football Association) Tishreen
17	MF	Zakria Hannan	21 August 1997 (aged 20)	(Syrian Football Association) Al Ittihad Aleppo
18	FW	Abd Al-Rahman Barakat	1 January 1998 (aged 20)	(Syrian Football Association) Al-Jaish
19	FW	Abdulhadi Shalha	19 January 1999 (aged 19)	(Syrian Football Association) Al-Wahda
20	MF	Ahmad Al Ahmad	18 October 1996 (aged 21)	(Syrian Football Association) Al Ittihad Aleppo
22	GK	Khaled Ibrahim	10 January 1996 (aged 22)	(Syrian Football Association) Al-Wahda
23	GK	Yazan Ourabi	30 January 1997 (aged 21)	(Syrian Football Association) Al Ittihad Aleppo

* Over-aged player.

Group C

Pos	Team	Pld	W	D	L	GF	GA	GD	Pts	Qualification
1	China	3	3	0	0	11	1	+10	9	Advance to knockout stage
2	Syria	3	2	0	1	6	5	+1	6	Advance to knockout stage
3	United Arab Emirates	3	1	0	2	5	4	+1	3	Advance to knockout stage
4	East Timor	3	0	0	3	3	15	−12	0	
5	Iraq	0	0	0	0	0	0	0	0	Withdrew, replaced by UAE

Source: Asian Games 2018
Rules for classification: Group stage tiebreakers
14 August 2018
19:00 UTC+7

United Arab Emirates	0–1	Syria
	Report	Barakat 53'

Jalak Harupat Stadium, Soreang
Referee: Aziz Asimov (Uzbekistan)

16 August 2018
19:00 UTC+7

Syria	0–3	China
	Report	Wei Shihao 40'; Zhang Yuning 45+2'; Chen Binbin 66'

Jalak Harupat Stadium, Soreang
Referee: Shaun Evans (Australia)

19 August 2018
19:00 UTC+7

East Timor	2–5	Syria
Gama 15'; Garcia 85'	Report	Hannan 33'; Shalha 42', 54', 90+1'; Koaeh 50'

Wibawa Mukti Stadium, Cikarang
Referee: Zaid Thamer Mohammed (Iraq)

Round of 16

23 August 2018
16:00 UTC+7

Palestine	0–1	Syria
	Report	Ashkar 73'

Patriot Candrabhaga Stadium, Bekasi
Referee: Ali Shaban (Kuwait)

Quarter-final

27 August 2018
19:30 UTC+7

Syria	0–1 (a.e.t.)	Vietnam
	Report	Nguyễn Văn Toàn 108'

Patriot Candrabhaga Stadium, Bekasi
Referee: Bijan Heidari (Iran)

== Gymnastics ==
=== Artistic Gymnastics ===
Men's

Athlete	Event	Qualification								Final							
Athlete	Event	Apparatus						Total	Rank	Apparatus						Total	Rank
Athlete	Event	F	PH	R	V	PB	HB	Total	Rank	F	PH	R	V	PB	HB	Total	Rank
Yazan Alsouliman
Yazan Alsouliman	Floor Exercise	7.100	—N/a					7.100	60	Did not advance							
Yazan Alsouliman	Pommel Horse	—N/a	0.000	—N/a				0.000	57	Did not advance							

== Ju-jitsu ==
Key:

- ADV – Won by advantages.
- RDC – Won by referee decision.
- SUB – Won by submission.

Men

Athlete	Event	Round of 64	Round of 32	Round of 16	Quarterfinal	Semifinal	Repechage	Final / BM	
Athlete	Event	Opposition Result	Opposition Result	Opposition Result	Opposition Result	Opposition Result	Opposition Result	Opposition Result	Rank
Abd Alsalam Haj Kadour	−77 kg	Bye	Algadri (INA); L 0–100^{SUB}	Did not advance					
Mohanad Sham	−77 kg	Bye	Al Rasheed (JOR); L 0–100^{SUB}	Did not advance					

== Judo ==
Key:

- 1st number — Ippon
- 2nd number — Waza-ari
- s — Shido

Men

Athlete	Event	Round of 32	Round of 16	Quarterfinals	Semifinals	Repechage	Final / BM	Rank
Athlete	Event	Opposition Result	Opposition Result	Opposition Result	Opposition Result	Opposition Result	Opposition Result	Rank
Mohamad Kasem	–81 kg	Bye	V Zoloev (KGZ); L 00s3–10s1	Did not advance				

== Kurash ==
Men

Athlete	Event	Round of 32	Round of 16	Quarterfinal	Semifinal	Final	
Athlete	Event	Opposition Score	Opposition Score	Opposition Score	Opposition Score	Opposition Score	Rank
Mohamad Kasem	–81 kg	DK Sannan (PAK); W 110−000	A Murodov (TJK); L 001−012	Did not advance			

Women

Athlete	Event	Round of 32	Round of 16	Quarterfinal	Semifinal	Final	
Athlete	Event	Opposition Score	Opposition Score	Opposition Score	Opposition Score	Opposition Score	Rank
Hasna Saied	–63 kg	Huang S-h (TPE); L 000−100	Did not advance				

== Sambo ==
Key:

- SU – Won by submission.

Athlete	Event	Round of 32	Round of 16	Quarterfinal	Semifinal	Repechage 1	Repechage 2	Repechage final	Final / BM	
Athlete	Event	Opposition Result	Opposition Result	Opposition Result	Opposition Result	Opposition Result	Opposition Result	Opposition Result	Opposition Result	Rank
Munir Ghusn	Men's 52 kg	Bye	Ý Orazdurdyýew (TKM); W 3–2	S Erdenebaatar (MGL); L 0–3	Did not advance	Bye	A Asakeev (KGZ); W 2–1	A Rakhmatilloev (UZB); L 0–4	Did not advance	
Hasna Saied	Women's 68 kg	Bye	G Ismatova (UZB); L 0–9	Did not advance						

== Swimming ==
Men

Athlete	Event	Heats		Final	
Athlete	Event	Time	Rank	Time	Rank
Azad Al-Barazi	50 m breaststroke	28.53	15	Did not advance	
Azad Al-Barazi	100 m breaststroke	1:03.01	15	Did not advance	

== Triathlon ==
Individual

Athlete	Event	Swim (1.5 km)	Trans 1	Bike (39.6 km)	Trans 2	Run (10 km)	Total Time	Rank
Mohamad Maso	Men's	19:56	0:27	56:46	0:25	35:40	1:53:14	6
Mohammad Al-Sabbagh	Men's	19:02	0:30	57:38	0:23			DNF

== Weightlifting ==
Men's

Athlete	Event	Snatch		Clean & jerk		Total	Rank
Athlete	Event	Result	Rank	Result	Rank	Total	Rank
Man Assad	+105 kg	187	5	~~225~~	—	—	—

== Wrestling ==
Key:

- F – Victory by fall.
- PP – Decision by points – the loser with technical points.
- PO – Decision by points – the loser without technical points.
- ST – Great superiority – the loser without technical points and a margin of victory of at least 8 (Greco-Roman) or 10 (freestyle) points.

Men's freestyle

Athlete	Event	Qualification	Round of 16	Quarterfinal	Semifinal	Repechage 1	Repechage 2	Final / BM	
Athlete	Event	Opposition Result	Opposition Result	Opposition Result	Opposition Result	Opposition Result	Opposition Result	Opposition Result	Rank
Fedaaldin Al-Asta	−86 kg	Shirai (JPN); L 0–2	Did not advance						11

Men's Greco-Roman

Athlete	Event	Round of 16	Quarterfinal	Semifinal	Repechage	Final / BM	
Athlete	Event	Opposition Result	Opposition Result	Opposition Result	Opposition Result	Opposition Result	Rank
Abdulkarim Al-Hasan	−67 kg	Geraei (IRN); L 2–11	Did not advance				13
