= 3x3 basketball at the 2018 Asian Games – Women's tournament =

Women at the 2018 Asian Games
- Venue: Gelora Bung Karno Tennis Center Court
- Date: 21–26 August 2018
- Competitors: 60 from 16 nations

Medalists
gold medal	China
silver medal	Japan
bronze medal	Thailand

The women's 3x3 basketball tournament at the 2018 Asian Games was held at the Gelora Bung Karno Tennis Center Court, Jakarta, Indonesia from 21 to 26 August 2018. Teams were restricted to under-23 players.

== Squads ==
China	Chinese Taipei	Indonesia	Iran
Li Yingyun; Dilana Dilixiati; Jiang Jiayin; Zhang Zhiting	Wang Jing-ting; Lin Tieh; Lo Pei-chen; Peng Hsiao-tong	Christie Apriyani; Dewa Ayu Made Sriartha; Delaya Maria; Ni Putu Eka Liana Febiananda	Sheida Shojaei; Kimia Yazdian; Zahra Edalatkar; Nahideh Asadi
Japan	Kazakhstan	Malaysia	Maldives
Ririka Okuyama; Norika Konno; Stephanie Mawuli; Kiho Miyashita	Madina Baibolekova; Alexandra Petelina; Anastassiya Arzamastseva; Luiza Zukova	Wong Sze Qian; Ng Yu Feng; Hiew Ky Lie; Ho Ching Yee	Maldives withdrew from the competition.
Mongolia	Nepal	Qatar	South Korea
Mönkhsaikhany Tserenlkham; Ganbatyn Minjin; Batsürengiin Nandintsetseg; Onolbaataryn Khulan	Anusha Malla; Alina Gurung; Bhawana Lama; Shreya Khadka	Yasmin Koshkosh; Sara Al-Saadi; Mona Mohamed Saad; Alaa Soliman	Kim Jin-hee; Choi Gyu-hee; Park Ji-eun; Kim Jin-yeong
Sri Lanka	Syria	Thailand	Vietnam
Rashmi Taniya Perera; Fathima Lubna Morseth; Anne Stephanie Ravindran; Imesha Thathsarani	Cedra Sulaiman; Noura Bshara; Farah Assad; Johna Mbayed	Amphawa Thuamon; Thunchanok Lumdabpang; Warunee Kitraksa; Rujiwan Bunsinprom	Phạm Thị Diễm Trân; Nguyễn Thị Tiểu Duy; Nguyễn Thị Cẩm Tiên; Trần Thị Yến Vân

== Results ==
All times are Western Indonesia Time (UTC+07:00)

=== Preliminary ===
==== Pool A ====
Pos	Team	Pld	W	L	PF	PA	PD	Qualification
1	China	3	3	0	66	26	+40	Quarterfinals
2	Malaysia	3	2	1	45	41	+4	Quarterfinals
3	Vietnam	3	1	2	33	41	−8	
4	Qatar	3	0	3	16	52	−36	

Source: OCA

21 August
15:40

Vietnam	12–13	Malaysia
Pts: Trần 5		Pts: Wong, Ho 4

Gelora Bung Karno Tennis Center Court, Jakarta
Referees: Al-Harthi (OMA), Rulyov (KAZ)

21 August
16:50

China	22–3	Qatar
Pts: Li, Jiang 8		Pts: Koshkosh 2

Gelora Bung Karno Tennis Center Court, Jakarta
Referees: Al-Harthi (OMA), Ito (JPN)

21 August
17:50

China	22–9	Vietnam
Pts: Jiang 9		Pts: Nguyễn T.T. 5

Gelora Bung Karno Tennis Center Court, Jakarta
Referees: Lim (MAS), Ibragimow (TKM)

24 August
18:40

Qatar	6–12	Vietnam
Pts: Soliman 4		Pts: Trần 7

Gelora Bung Karno Tennis Center Court, Jakarta
Referees: Al-Harthi (OMA), Tan (SGP)

24 August
19:00

Malaysia	14–22	China
Pts: Ho 8		Pts: Jiang 12

Gelora Bung Karno Tennis Center Court, Jakarta
Referees: Ito (JPN), Al-Harthi (OMA)

24 August
20:00

Qatar	7–18	Malaysia
Pts: Soliman 4		Pts: Ho 9

Gelora Bung Karno Tennis Center Court, Jakarta
Referees: Al-Harthi (OMA), Ibragimow (TKM)

==== Pool B ====
Pos	Team	Pld	W	L	PF	PA	PD	Qualification
1	Japan	3	3	0	57	15	+42	Quarterfinals
2	Chinese Taipei	3	2	1	50	32	+18	Quarterfinals
3	Mongolia	3	1	2	23	54	−31	
4	Nepal	3	0	3	23	52	−29	

Source: OCA

22 August
15:40

Mongolia	1–22	Japan
Pts: Khulan 1		Pts: Okuyama 10

Gelora Bung Karno Tennis Center Court, Jakarta
Referees: Lim (MAS), Quinn (INA)

22 August
16:50

Nepal	8–19	Chinese Taipei
Pts: Malla, Lama 3		Pts: Lo 9

Gelora Bung Karno Tennis Center Court, Jakarta
Referees: Lim (MAS), Rulyov (KAZ)

22 August
18:20

Japan	14–10	Chinese Taipei
Pts: Miyashita 6		Pts: Wang 4

Gelora Bung Karno Tennis Center Court, Jakarta
Referees: Shi (CHN), Tan (SGP)

25 August
19:40

Mongolia	12–11	Nepal
Pts: Tserenlkham, Minjin 5		Pts: Khadka 4

Gelora Bung Karno Tennis Center Court, Jakarta
Referees: Lim (MAS), Al-Harthi (OMA)

25 August
20:50

Japan	21–4	Nepal
Pts: Konno 8		Pts: Malla 3

Gelora Bung Karno Tennis Center Court, Jakarta
Referees: Al-Harthi (OMA), Ibragimow (TKM)

25 August
21:10

Chinese Taipei	21–10	Mongolia
Pts: Lo 9		Pts: Minjin 4

Gelora Bung Karno Tennis Center Court, Jakarta
Referees: Liu (MAS), Lim (MAS)

==== Pool C ====
Pos	Team	Pld	W	L	PF	PA	PD	Qualification
1	Thailand	3	3	0	32	13	+19	Quarterfinals
2	Iran	3	2	1	25	23	+2	Quarterfinals
3	Kazakhstan	3	1	2	18	39	−21	
—	Maldives	3	0	3	0	0	0	

Source: OCA

21 August
19:00

Iran	7–11	Thailand
Pts: Yazdian 3		Pts: Bunsinprom 5

Gelora Bung Karno Tennis Center Court, Jakarta
Referees: Shi (CHN), Lim (MAS)

21 August
19:20

Kazakhstan	vs.	Maldives
Forfeit

Gelora Bung Karno Tennis Center Court, Jakarta

24 August
15:20

Iran	18–12	Kazakhstan
Pts: Yazdian 7		Pts: Zukova 9

Gelora Bung Karno Tennis Center Court, Jakarta
Referees: Lim (MAS), Shi (CHN)

24 August
15:40

Maldives	vs.	Thailand
Forfeit

Gelora Bung Karno Tennis Center Court, Jakarta

24 August
16:20

Kazakhstan	6–21	Thailand
Pts: Petelina, Arzamastseva, Zukova 2		Pts: Bunsinprom 7

Gelora Bung Karno Tennis Center Court, Jakarta
Referees: Shi (CHN), Lim (MAS)

24 August
16:50

Iran	vs.	Maldives
Forfeit

Gelora Bung Karno Tennis Center Court, Jakarta

==== Pool D ====
Pos	Team	Pld	W	L	PF	PA	PD	Qualification
1	South Korea	3	3	0	59	32	+27	Quarterfinals
2	Indonesia	3	2	1	46	46	0	Quarterfinals
3	Sri Lanka	3	1	2	32	54	−22	
4	Syria	3	0	3	42	47	−5	

Source: OCA

22 August
19:40

Indonesia	16–15	Syria
Pts: Sriartha 8		Pts: Sulaiman 8

Gelora Bung Karno Tennis Center Court, Jakarta
Referees: Al-Harthi (OMA), Ito (JPN)

22 August
20:50

Syria	15–16	South Korea
Pts: Assad 7		Pts: Choi 7

Gelora Bung Karno Tennis Center Court, Jakarta
Referees: Al-Harthi (OMA), Tan (SGP)

22 August
21:10

Sri Lanka	9–21	Indonesia
Pts: Perera, Thathsarani 3		Pts: Febiananda 7

Gelora Bung Karno Tennis Center Court, Jakarta
Referees: Shi (CHN), Ho (HKG)

25 August
15:40

South Korea	21–8	Sri Lanka
Pts: Kim J.Y. 10		Pts: Perera 5

Gelora Bung Karno Tennis Center Court, Jakarta
Referees: Shi (CHN), Ito (JPN)

25 August
16:50

Sri Lanka	15–12	Syria
Pts: Thathsarani 6		Pts: Bshara 7

Gelora Bung Karno Tennis Center Court, Jakarta
Referees: Shi (CHN), Tan (SGP)

25 August
18:40

Indonesia	9–22	South Korea
Pts: Sriartha 5		Pts: Kim J.Y. 10

Gelora Bung Karno Tennis Center Court, Jakarta
Referees: Rulyov (KAZ), Lim (MAS)

=== Knockout round ===
Quarterfinals
26 August
China	21
Iran	7
26 August
South Korea	11
Chinese Taipei	15
26 August
Japan	15
Indonesia	6
26 August
Thailand	15
Malaysia	13

Semifinals
26 August
China	21
Chinese Taipei	12
26 August
Japan	21
Thailand	16

Gold medal game
26 August
China	21
Japan	10
Bronze medal game
26 August
Chinese Taipei	14
Thailand (OT)	15

==== Quarterfinals ====
26 August
14:40

China	21–7	Iran
Pts: Jiang 9		Pts: Yazdian, Asadi 3

Gelora Bung Karno Tennis Center Court, Jakarta
Referees: Quinn (INA), Rulyov (KAZ)

26 August
15:00

South Korea	11–15	Chinese Taipei
Pts: Kim J.Y. 8		Pts: Lin 5

Gelora Bung Karno Tennis Center Court, Jakarta
Referees: Lim (MAS), Ibragimow (TKM)

26 August
15:30

Japan	15–6	Indonesia
Pts: Okuyama, Mawuli 5		Pts: Apriyani 3

Gelora Bung Karno Tennis Center Court, Jakarta
Referees: Shi (CHN), Liu (MAS)

26 August
15:50

Thailand	15–13	Malaysia
Pts: Bunsinprom 7		Pts: Wong 5

Gelora Bung Karno Tennis Center Court, Jakarta
Referees: Al-Harthi (OMA), Ito (JPN)

==== Semifinals ====
26 August
17:00

China	21–12	Chinese Taipei
Pts: Dilana 7		Pts: Wang 6

Gelora Bung Karno Tennis Center Court, Jakarta
Referees: Quinn (INA), Lim (MAS)

26 August
17:30

Japan	21–16	Thailand
Pts: Mawuli 8		Pts: Bunsinprom 8

Gelora Bung Karno Tennis Center Court, Jakarta
Referees: Shi (CHN), Al-Harthi (OMA)

==== Bronze medal game ====
26 August
19:15

Chinese Taipei	14–15 (OT)	Thailand
Pts: Lo 10		Pts: Bunsinprom 6

Gelora Bung Karno Tennis Center Court, Jakarta

==== Gold medal game ====
26 August
20:30

China	21–10	Japan
Pts: Li, Jiang 7		Pts: Mawuli 4

Gelora Bung Karno Tennis Center Court, Jakarta
Referees: Lim (MAS), Rulyov (KAZ)

== Final standing ==
Rank	Team	Pld	W	L
1st place, gold medalist(s)	China	6	6	0
2nd place, silver medalist(s)	Japan	6	5	1
3rd place, bronze medalist(s)	Thailand	6	5	1
4	Chinese Taipei	6	3	3
5	South Korea	4	3	1
6	Indonesia	4	2	2
7	Malaysia	4	2	2
8	Iran	4	2	2
9	Vietnam	3	1	2
10	Sri Lanka	3	1	2
11	Kazakhstan	3	1	2
12	Mongolia	3	1	2
13	Syria	3	0	3
14	Nepal	3	0	3
15	Qatar	3	0	3
—	Maldives	3	0	3
