= Keita Suzuki =

Keita Suzuki may refer to:

- Keita Suzuki (footballer, born 1981)
- Keita Suzuki (footballer, born 1997)
- Keita Suzuki (basketball)
