= Syria women's national 3x3 team =

National sports team

Syria
- FIBA zone: FIBA Asia
- National federation: Syrian Basketball Federation

FIBA 3x3 World Championships
- Appearances: 1 (2014)
- Medals: None

Asian Championships
- Appearances: None

The Syria women's national 3x3 team is a national basketball team of Syria, administered by the Syrian Basketball Federation. It represents the country in international 3x3 (3 against 3) women's basketball competitions.

== Competition record ==
=== Summer Olympics ===
Year	Position	Pld	W	L	Players
(Japan) 2020 Tokyo	Did not qualify				
(France) 2024 Paris	TBD				—N/a
Total		0	0	0	

=== 3x3 World Cup ===
Year	Position	Pld	W	L	Players
(Greece) 2012 Athens	Did not qualify				
(Russia) 2014 Moscow	21st	5	1	4	Malki, Magarian, Al Hamwi, Sran
(China) 2016 Guangzhou	Did not qualify				
(France) 2017 Nantes	Did not qualify				
(Philippines) 2018 Bocaue	Did not qualify				
(Netherlands) 2019 Amsterdam	Did not qualify				
(Belgium) 2022 Antwerp	Did not qualify				
(Austria) 2023 Vienna	Did not qualify				
(Mongolia) 2025 Ulaanbaatar	Did not qualify				
(Poland) 2026 Warsaw	TBD				—N/a
2027 Singapore	TBD				—N/a
Total		5	1	4	

=== 3x3 Asia Cup ===
Year	Position	Pld	W	L	Players
(Qatar) 2013 Doha	Did not qualify				
(Mongolia) 2017 Ulaanbaatar	Did not qualify				
(China) 2018 Shenzhen	Did not qualify				
(China) 2019 Changsha	Did not qualify				
Total		0	0	0	

=== Asian Games ===
Year	Position	Pld	W	L	Players
(Indonesia) 2018 Jakarta	13th	3	0	3	Assad, Bshara, Mbayed, Sulaiman
(China) 2022 Hangzhou	TBD				—N/a
Total		3	0	3	

=== Asian Indoor Games ===
Year	Position	Pld	W	L	Players
(Vietnam) 2009 Ho Chi Minh City	Did not qualify				
(Turkmenistan) 2017 Asghabad	4th	5	3	2	Assad, Magarian, Sulaiman, Zubi
(Thailand) 2021 Bangkok/Chonpuri	TBD				—N/a
Total		5	3	2	

=== Asian Beach Games ===
Year	Position	Pld	W	L	Players
(Indonesia) 2008 Bali	Did not qualify				
(China) 2012 Haiyang	Did not qualify				
(Thailand) 2014 Phuket	Did not qualify				
(Vietnam) 2016 Da Nang	Did not qualify				
(China) 2021 Sanya	TBD				—N/a
Total		0	0	0	

=== Islamic Solidarity Games ===
Year	Position	Pld	W	L	Players
(Azerbaijan) 2017 Baku	5th	5	3	2	Assad, Magarian, Sulaiman, Zubi
(Turkey) 2022 Konya	TBD				—N/a
Total		5	3	2	

== Team ==
=== Current roster ===
The following is the Syria roster in the women's 3x3 basketball tournament of the 2018 Asian Games.

- Farah Assad
- Noura Bshara
- Johna Mbayed
- Cedra Suleiman

== See also ==
- Syria women's national basketball team
