= Poland men's national 3x3 team =

National 3x3 basketball team

Poland
- FIBA ranking: 18
- FIBA zone: FIBA Europe
- National federation: Polish Basketball Association
- Nickname: Biało-czerwoni

Olympic Games
- Appearances: 2

World Cup
- Appearances: 8
- Medals: (bronze) (2019)

Europe Cup
- Appearances: 5
- Medals: (bronze) (2021)
Medal record
Men's 3x3 basketball
Representing Poland
World Cup
Bronze medal – third place	2019 Amsterdam	Team
Europe Cup
Bronze medal – third place	2021 Paris
European Games
Bronze medal – third place	2023 Kraków–Małopolska

The Poland men's national 3x3 team is a national 3x3 basketball team of Poland, administered by the Polski Zwiazek Koszykówki.

== Senior competitions ==
=== Summer Olympics ===
Year	Position	Pld	W	L	Players
(Japan) 2020 Tokyo	7th	7	2	5	Hicks, Zamojski, S. Rduch, Pawłowski
(France) 2024 Paris	6th	8	2	6	Matczak, Sokołowski, Zamojski, Bogucki
(United States) 2028 Los Angeles	To be determined				
Total	2/2	15	4	11	

=== FIBA 3x3 World Cup ===
Year	Position	Pld	W	L	Players
(Greece) 2012 Athens	did not qualify				
(Russia) 2014 Moscow	7th	7	5	2	Lewandowski, Wojtyński, Rudko, Barszcz
(China) 2016 Guangzhou	20th	4	0	4	Kenig, Lewandowski, P. Rduch, Wojtyński
(France) 2017 Nantes	10th	4	2	2	S. Rduch, P. Rduch, Kobus, Brek
(Philippines) 2018 Bocaue	4th	7	4	3	Hicks, Sroka, S. Rduch, Pawłowski
(Netherlands) 2019 Amsterdam	3rd	7	5	2	Hicks, Zamojski, Sroka, Pawłowski
(Belgium) 2022 Antwerp	8th	6	3	3	Diduszko, Pawłowski, S. Rduch, Zamojski
(Austria) 2023 Vienna	7th	5	2	3	Bogucki, S. Rduch, Szlachetka, Zamojski
(Mongolia) 2025 Ulaanbaatar	did not qualify				
(Poland) 2026 Warsaw	18th	4	0	4	Ponitka, Sokołowski, Waczyński, Zamojski
2027 Singapore	To be determined				
Total	8/11	44	21	23	

=== FIBA 3x3 Europe Cup ===
Year	Position	Pld	W	L	Players
(Romania) 2014	did not qualify				
(Romania) 2016	8th	3	1	2	Kenig, Kulon, Lewandowski, P. Rduch
(Netherlands) 2017	did not qualify				
(Romania) 2018	5th	3	1	2	Hicks, Pawlowski, S. Rduch, Sroka
(Hungary) 2019	5th	3	1	2	Hicks, Pawlowski, Zamojski, Sroka
(France) 2021	3rd	5	4	1	Pawlowski, Zamojski, Diduszko, P. Rduch
(Austria) 2022	5th	3	1	2	Ponitka, Sulima, Zamojski, P. Rduch
(Israel) 2023	did not qualify				
(Denmark) 2025	did not qualify				
(Belgium) 2026	did not qualify				

=== European Games ===
Year	Position	Pld	W	L	Players
(Belarus) 2019 Minsk	4th	6	3	3	Adamkiewicz, Konopatzki, Pisarski, Wojtyński
(Poland) 2023 Kraków–Małopolska	3rd	6	4	2	Bogucki, S. Rduch, Szlachetka, Zamojski
(Turkey) 2027 Istanbul	To be determined				

== Youth competitions ==
=== Youth Olympic Games ===
Year	Position	Pld	W	L
2010 Singapore	did not participate			
(China) 2014 Nanjing	5th	11	6	5
(Argentina) 2018 Buenos Aires	did not participate			

=== Youth World Championships ===
Year	Position	Pld	W	L
2011 Italy	did not qualify			
2012 Spain	17th			
2013 Indonesia	8th			
2015 Hungary	9th			
2016 Kazakhstan	did not qualify			
2017 China	15th	4	1	3
2019 Mongolia	did not qualify			
2021 Hungary	did not qualify			
2022 Hungary	did not qualify			
2023 Hungary	did not qualify			
2024 Hungary	did not qualify			

== See also ==
- Poland men's national basketball team
- Poland women's national 3x3 team
