= Masahiro Komatsu =

Japanese basketball player

Masahiro Komatsu 小松昌弘
No. 70 – Japan national basketball team
- Position: Forward
- League: FIBA 3X3

Personal information
- Born: April 22, 1984 (age 42) Miyagi Prefecture
- Listed height: 6 ft 3 in (1.91 m)
- Listed weight: 196 lb (89 kg)

Career information
- High school: Sendai (Sendai, Miyagi)
- College: University of Tsukuba
Medals
Men's basketball
Representing Japan
FIBA Asia 3x3 Cup
Bronze medal – third place	2018 Shenzhen	Japan 3x3

Masahiro Komatsu (born April 22, 1984) is a Japanese basketball player who plays for Japan men's national 3x3 team. He played college basketball for the University of Tsukuba.

== Awards and honors ==
- 3x3 Central Europe Tour 2019 - Chance 3x3 Tour Jindřichův Hradec Champions
