= Marie-Ève Paget =

French basketball player (born 1994)

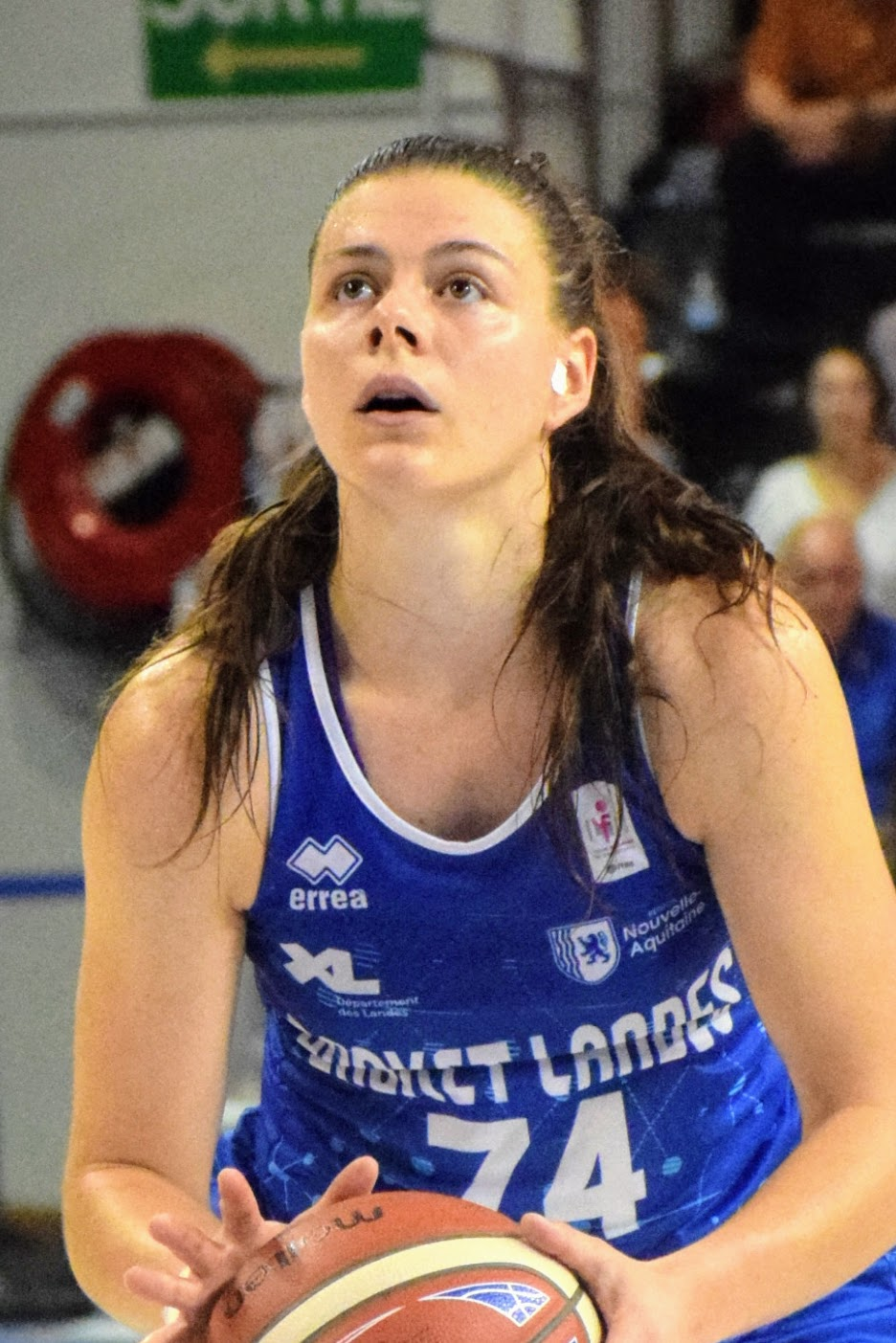
- Paget with Basket Landes in 2021

Personal information
- Born: 28 November 1994 (age 31) Annecy, France
- Listed height: 5 ft 7 in (1.70 m)

Career information
- Playing career: 2011–present
- Position: point guard

Career history
- 2011–2012: Challes-les-Eaux
- 2012–2015: Nice
- 2015–2017: Angers
- 2017–2019: Flammes Carolo
- 2019–2023: Basket Landes
- 2024–: Villeneuve-d'Ascq

Career highlights
- French League champion (2021); French League 2 champion (2015); 2x French Cup winner (2022, 2023); FIBA 3x3 World Cup winner (2022); FIBA 3x3 Europe Cup winner (2018, 2019)
Medals
Women's 3x3 basketball
Representing France
World Cup
| Gold medal – first place | 2022 Antwerp |
| Silver medal – second place | 2023 Vienna |
| Bronze medal – third place | 2019 Amsterdam |
| Bronze medal – third place | 2018 Bocaue |
Europe Cup
| Gold medal – first place | 2019 Debrecen |
| Gold medal – first place | 2018 Bucharest |
| Silver medal – second place | 2024 Vienna |
| Bronze medal – third place | 2021 Paris |

Marie-Ève Paget (born 28 November 1994) is a French basketball player who plays as a point guard.

== Professional career ==
Trained in Annecy then Challes-les-Eaux, Paget spent three years in Nice where she was Ligue 2 champion and MVP of the Final Four in 2015. In February 2014, she was named to the Victoires du sport niçois. On May 18, 2015, she signed a two-year contract with Angers Basket 49. After a 2016–2017 season with 5.1 points and 2.7 assists on average in a club that ended up relegated to Ligue 2, she signed with Flammes Carolo where she assisted Amel Bouderra.

In April 2019, Paget signed with Basket Landes on a two years contract. In April 2020, her place in Landes for a second season was confirmed. On 15 May 2021, she won her first LFB championship with Basket Landes, in which she became the captain during the following season. On 23 April 2022, she won the final of the Coupe de France for the first time in Paris-Bercy, against Bourges, with a score of 91–88 after two overtimes, a suspense without name, a match without weakening from start to finish, supported by more than 1000 Landes fans.

== National team career ==
In 2017, Paget was part of the French senior team that won the Jeux de la Francophonie.

In June 2018, Paget was selected for the French 3x3 team that competed and finished third in the World Cup held from 8 to 12 June in Manila and won another bronze medal in 2019.

In May 2021, Paget was a member of the French 3x3 team that qualified for the Tokyo Olympic tournament. In September of the same year, she led the three-woman French team to third place on the podium in the 2021 European Cup, finishing individually in the ideal team of the tournament.

To compensate for Alix Duchet's absence due to injury, Paget was called up for the first time in November 2021 to the French senior team to take part in the preparatory training camp for the EuroBasket 2023 qualifiers.
