= Tatsuhito Noro =

Japanese basketball player

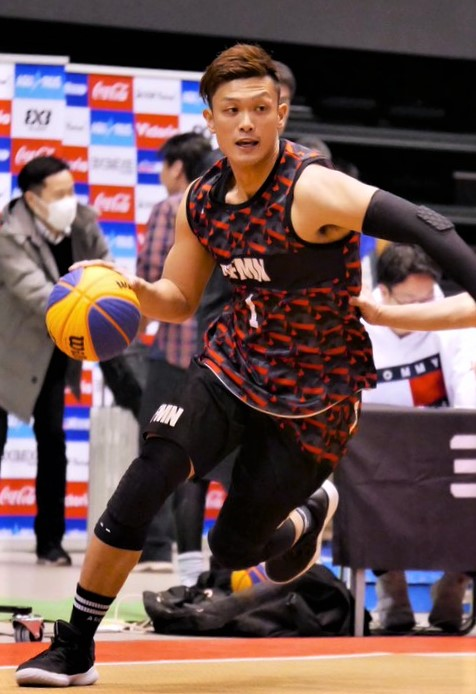

No. 1 – Beefman.exe
- League: FIBA 3X3

Personal information
- Born: June 24, 1988 (age 38) Takikawa, Hokkaido
- Listed height: 6 ft 2 in (1.88 m)
- Listed weight: 201 lb (91 kg)

Career information
- High school: Tokai University No.4 High (Sapporo, Hokkaido)
- College: Tokai University

Career history
- ?-present: Beefman.exe
Medals
Men's basketball
Representing Japan
FIBA Asia 3x3 Cup
Bronze medal – third place	2018 Shenzhen	Japan 3x3

Tatsuhito Noro (born June 24, 1988) is a Japanese professional basketball player who plays for Beefman.exe . He played college basketball for Tokai University. He represented the country for Japan national 3x3 team.

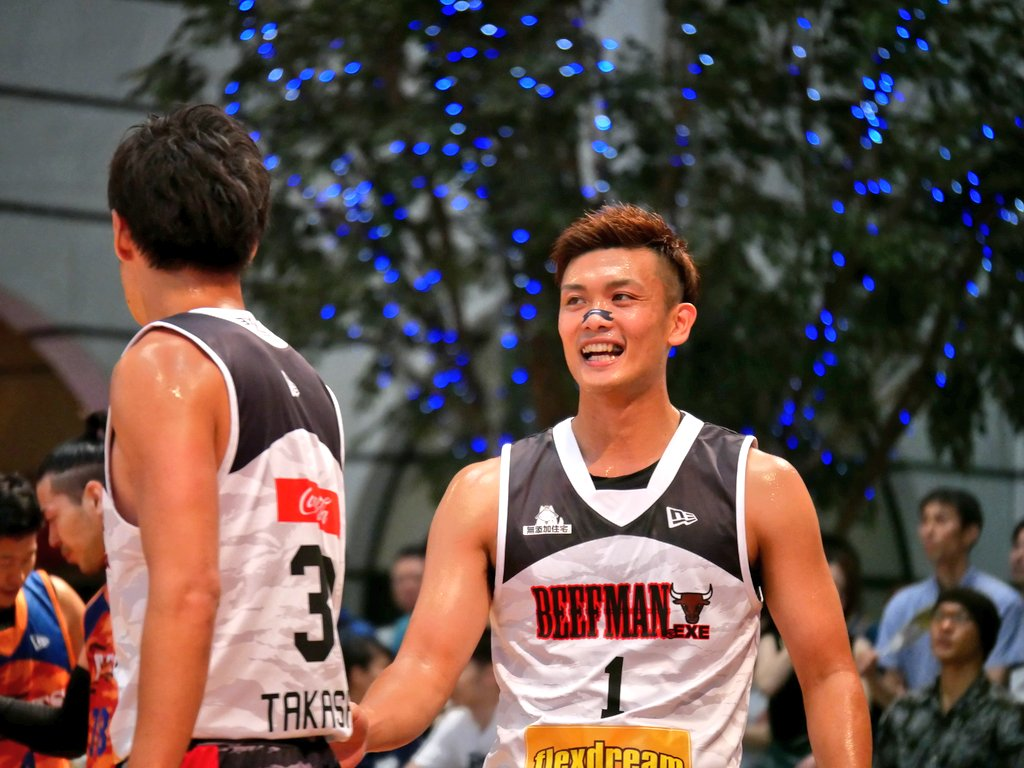
Noro with Beefman.exe
