= Tomoya Ochiai =

Japanese basketball player

Tomoya Ochiai 落合知也
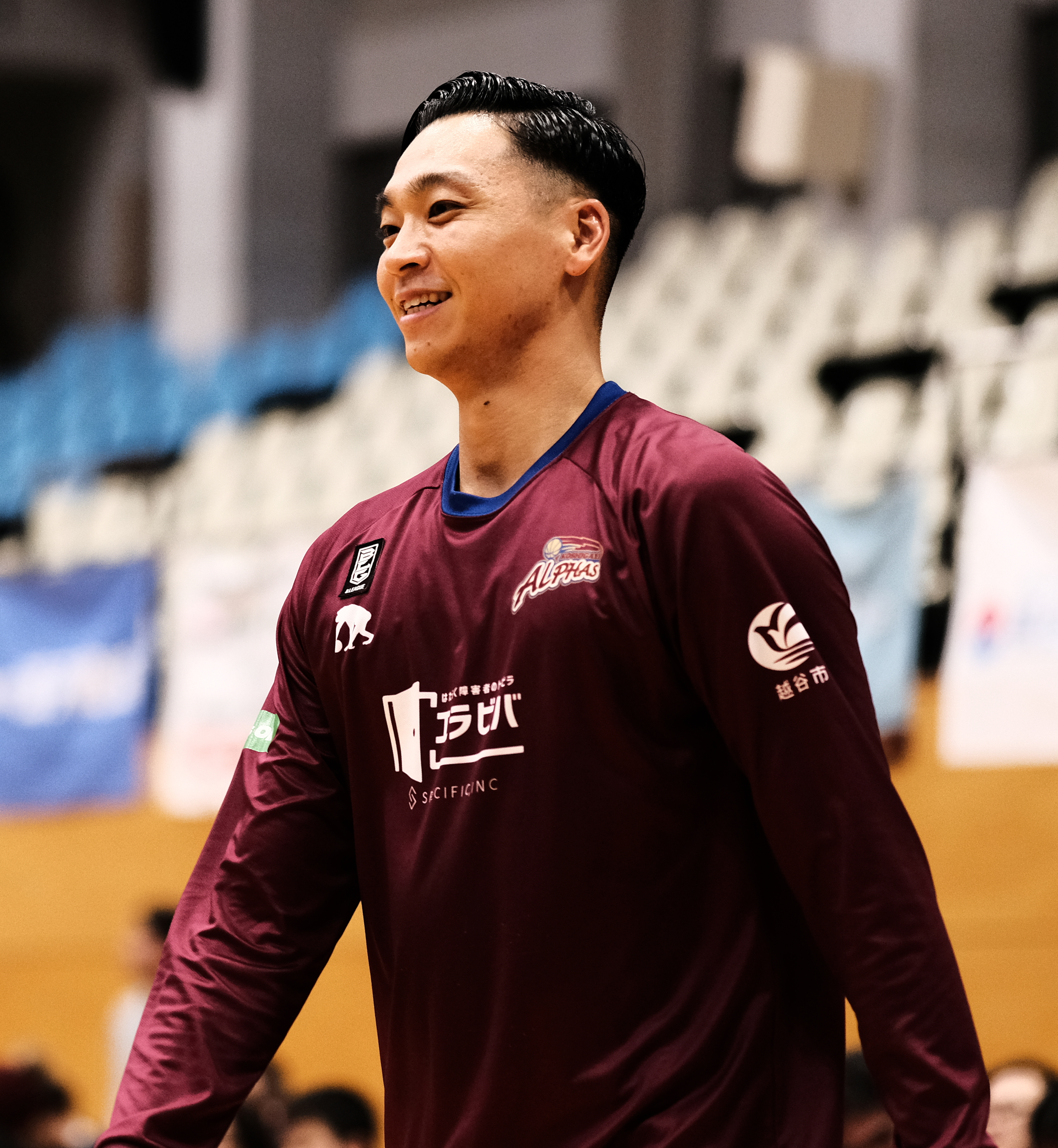
- Ochiai with Koshigaya in 2019

No. 91 – Shinagawa City
- Position: Forward
- League: B.League, FIBA 3X3

Personal information
- Born: June 18, 1987 (age 39) Tokyo
- Listed height: 6 ft 5 in (1.96 m)
- Listed weight: 187 lb (85 kg)

Career information
- High school: Tsuchiura Nichidai (Tsuchiura, Ibaraki)
- College: Hosei University

Career history
- 2009–2013: Underdog
- 2013-2016: Otsuka Corporation Alphas
- 2016-2018: Tochigi Brex
- 2018-2023: Koshigaya Alphas
- 2024-: Shinagawa City

Career highlights
- NBDL Best Five (2015-16); B.League champion (2016-17)
Medals
Men's basketball
Representing Japan
FIBA Asia 3x3 Cup
| Bronze medal – third place | 2018 Shenzhen | Japan 3x3 |

Tomoya Ochiai (落合 知也, Ochiai Tomoya; born June 18, 1987), nicknamed Worm, is a Japanese professional basketball player who plays for Koshigaya Alphas of the B.League in Japan. He played college basketball for Hosei University. He also plays for Japan men's national 3x3 team.

== Awards and honors ==
- 3x3 Central Europe Tour 2019 - Chance 3x3 Tour Jindřichův Hradec Champions

== Career statistics ==
Legend
| GP | Games played | GS | Games started | MPG | Minutes per game |
| FG% | Field goal percentage | 3P% | 3-point field goal percentage | FT% | Free throw percentage |
| RPG | Rebounds per game | APG | Assists per game | SPG | Steals per game |
| BPG | Blocks per game | PPG | Points per game | **Bold** | Career high |

=== Regular season ===
| Year | Team | GP | GS | MPG | FG% | 3P% | FT% | RPG | APG | SPG | BPG | PPG |
|---|---|---|---|---|---|---|---|---|---|---|---|---|
| 2013-14 | Otsuka | 32 | 21 | 29.4 | .410 | .182 | .640 | 8.0 | 1.2 | 0.3 | 0.2 | 10.3 |
| 2014-15 | Otsuka | 31 | 25 | 29.3 | .432 | .250 | .741 | 7.5 | 2.1 | 0.3 | 0.1 | 12.0 |
| 2015-16 | Otsuka | 35 | 34 | 29.5 | .435 | .328 | .786 | 7.8 | 2.1 | 0.5 | 0.2 | 11.5 |
| 2016-17 | Tochigi | 4 | | 2.0 | .000 | .000 | .000 | 0.5 | 0.0 | 0.0 | 0.0 | 0.0 |
| 2017-18 | Tochigi | 24 | | 2.9 | .238 | .400 | .750 | 0.2 | 0.1 | 0.0 | 0.0 | 0.6 |
| 2018-19 | Koshigaya | 46 | 13 | 16.5 | .457 | .353 | .663 | 2.9 | 1.2 | 0.2 | 0.1 | 6.4 |

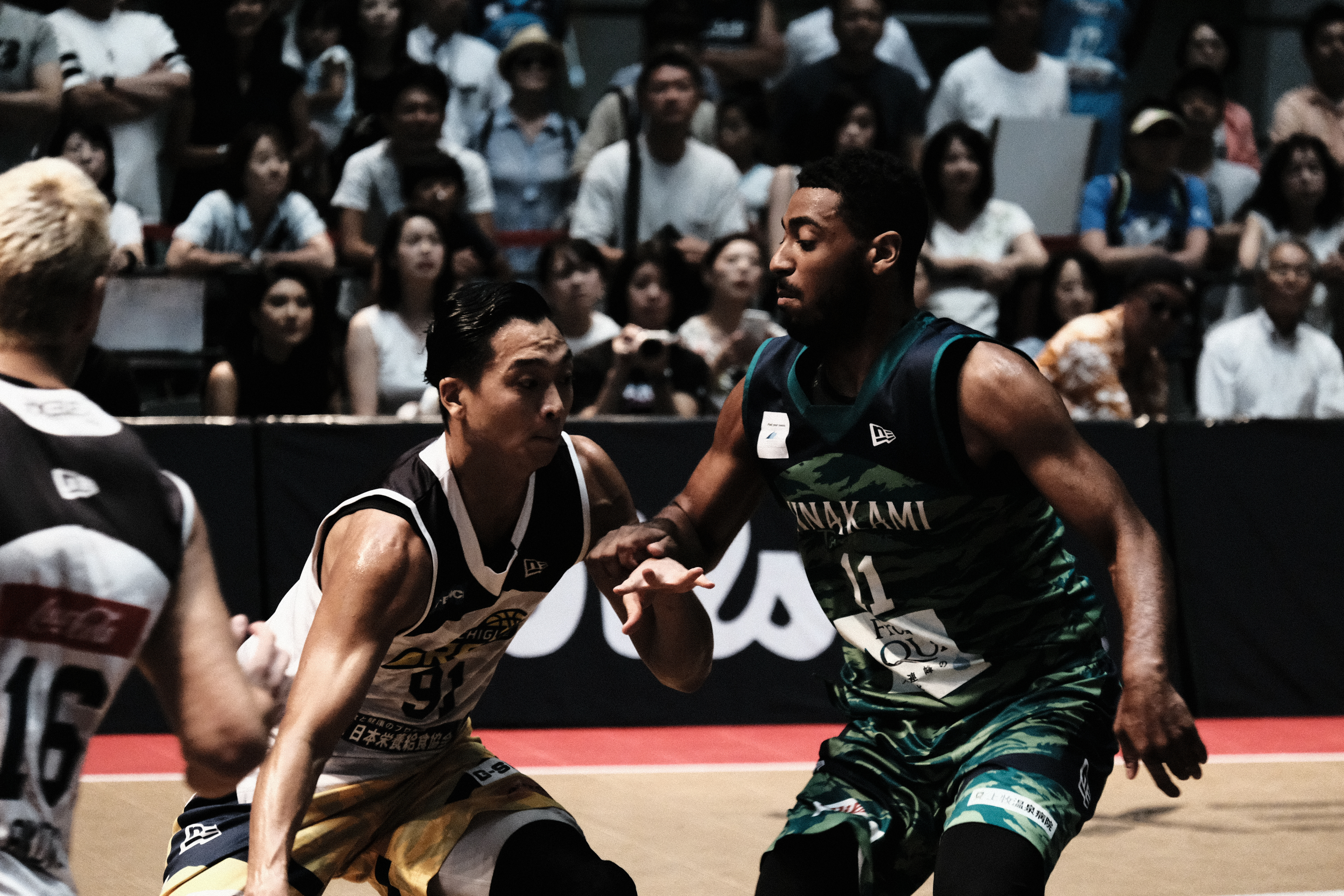
Ochiai in 2018
