= Szymon Rduch =

Polish basketball player (born 1989)

Personal information
- Born: 17 August 1989 (age 37) Kołobrzeg, Poland
- Listed height: 1.97 m (6 ft 6 in)
- Listed weight: 96 kg (212 lb)
Medals
Men's 3x3 basketball
Representing Poland
European Games
Bronze medal – third place	2023 Kraków–Małopolska	Team
Europe Cup
Bronze medal – third place	2021 Paris

Szymon Rduch OLY (born 17 August 1989) is a Polish basketball player for the Polish 3x3 national team.

He represented Poland at the 2020 Summer Olympics.
