= Piotr Grabowski =

Piotr Grabowski may refer to:

- Piotr Grabowski (clergyman) (died 1625), Polish political writer, parish priest of Pärnu
- Piotr Grabowski (born 1947) (1947–1998), Polish actor
- Piotr Grabowski (born 1968) (born 1968), Polish actor
- Piotr Grabowski (born 1972) (born 1972), Polish actor

== See also ==
- Grabowski
