= Przemysław Zamojski =

Polish basketball player (born 1986)

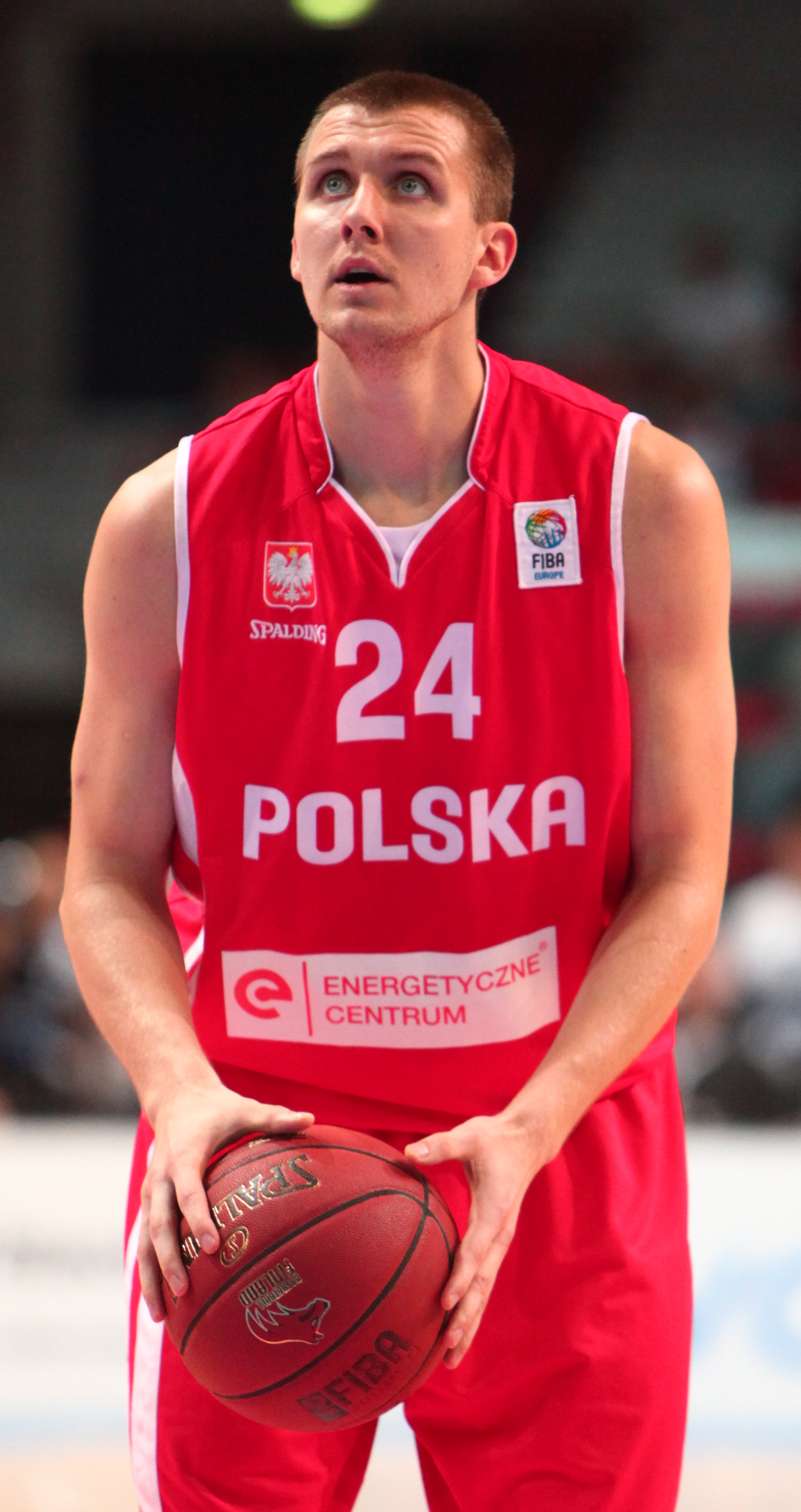
- Zamojski in September 2012

Personal information
- Born: 16 December 1986 (age 38) Elbląg, Poland
- Listed height: 6 ft 4 in (1.93 m)
- Listed weight: 204.6 lb (93 kg)

Career information
- College: Independence CC (2005–2006)
- NBA draft: 2007: undrafted
- Playing career: 2006–2021
- Position: Shooting guard

Career history
- 2006–2012: Prokom
- 2012: Trefl Sopot
- 2012–2013: Prokom
- 2013–2020: Zielona Góra
- 2020–2021: Włocławek

Career highlights
- 10× Polish League champion (2007–2012, 2015–2017, 2020); 3× Polish Cup winner (2008, 2015, 2017); Polish Cup MVP (2015); 2× Polish SuperCup winner (2012, 2015)
Medals
Men's 3x3 basketball
Representing Poland
World Cup
Bronze medal – third place	2019 Amsterdam	Team
European Games
Bronze medal – third place	2023 Kraków–Małopolska	Team
Europe Cup
Bronze medal – third place	2021 Paris

Przemysław Zamojski (born 16 December 1986) is a Polish professional 3x3 basketball player as well as a retired basketball player.

== Professional career ==
In July 2012, Zamojski signed with Trefl Sopot. He left them in December and returned to Prokom. In July 2013, he signed with Stelmet Zielona Góra. In January 2014, he signed a new one-and-a-half-year contract with Zielona Góra. He won a bronze medal with the Polish team at the 2019 FIBA 3x3 World Cup as well as 2021 FIBA 3x3 Europe Cup.

On 25 June 2021 he announced his retirement from professional basketball in order to focus entirely on 3x3 basketball.

== Polish national team ==
Zamojski played with the senior Polish national team at the EuroBasket 2013, the EuroBasket 2015, and the EuroBasket 2017.
