= Li Yingyun =

Chinese basketball player

No. 5 – Shanghai Swordfish
- Position: Guard
- League: WCBA

Personal information
- Born: September 6, 1995 (age 31) Shanghai, China
- Listed height: 5 ft 9 in (1.75 m)

Career information
- Playing career: 2013–present

Career history
- 2013–present: Shanghai Swordfish
Medals
Women's 3x3 basketball
Representing China
World Cup
Gold medal – first place	2019 Amsterdam	Team
Asian Games
Gold medal – first place	2018 Jakarta	Team
Asia Cup
Silver medal – second place	2018 Shenzhen	Team

Li Yingyun (Chinese: 李颖韵, born 6 September 1995) is a Chinese basketball player. She was named to the Mythical Three (All-Tournament Team) at the 2018 FIBA 3x3 World Cup.
