= Keita Suzuki (basketball) =

Japanese basketball player

Keita Suzuki 鈴木慶太
No. 7 – Tokyo Dime
- League: FIBA 3X3

Personal information
- Born: July 3, 1981 (age 45) Kanagawa Prefecture
- Listed height: 5 ft 11 in (1.80 m)
- Listed weight: 181 lb (82 kg)

Career information
- High school: Tsurumine (Chigasaki, Kanagawa)
- College: Meiji University

Career history
- ?-?: Far East Ballers
- ?-?: Somecity
- ?-?: Tokyo Dime
Medals
Men's basketball
Representing Japan
FIBA Asia 3x3 Cup
Bronze medal – third place	2018 Shenzhen	Japan 3x3

Keita Suzuki (born July 3, 1981) is a Japanese professional basketball player who plays for Tokyo Dime. He played college basketball for Meiji University. He represented his country for in the Japan national 3x3 team.
