= Japan men's national 3x3 team =

National 3x3 basketball team

Japan
- FIBA ranking: 25
- FIBA zone: FIBA Asia
- National federation: Japan Basketball Association
- Coach: Torsten Loibl

Olympic Games
- Appearances: 1

World Cup
- Appearances: 8

Asian Cup
- Appearances: 9
- Medals: (2018)
Home	Away

The Japan men's national 3x3 team represents Japan in international 3x3 (3 against 3) basketball competitions. It is governed by the Japan Basketball Association (JBA). (Japanese: 日本バスケットボール協会)

It represents the country in international 3x3 (3 against 3) basketball competitions.

As of late 2019, the head coach has been Torsten Loibl.

== Tournament record ==
=== Olympic Games ===
Year	Position	Pld	W	L	Players
(Japan) 2020 Tokyo	6th	8	2	6	Brown, Ochiai, Tominaga, Yasuoka
(France) 2024 Paris	Did not qualify				
Total	1/2	8	2	6	

=== World Cup ===
Year	Position	Pld	W	L	Players
2012 Greece	did not qualify				
2014 Russia	20th	5	1	4	Nomoto, Ochai, Suzuki, Takaku
2016 China	11th	4	2	2	Komatsu, Kawachi, Ochiai, Suzuki
2017 France	did not qualify				
2018 Philippines	14th	4	1	3	Komatsu, Noro, Ochiai, Suzuki
2019 Netherlands	14th	4	2	2	Kobayashi, Komatsu, Ochiai, Yasuoka
2022 Belgium	19th	4	0	4	Fujitaka, Ochiai, Sadohara, Yasuoka
(Austria) 2023 Vienna	12th	5	2	3	Kennedy, Ochiai, Sadohara, Yasuoka
(Mongolia) 2025 Ulaanbaatar	12th	5	2	3	Dewa, Igo, Nakanishi, Ozawa
(Poland) 2026 Warsaw	20th	4	0	4	Coulibaly, Igo, Nakanishi, Ozawa
2027 Singapore	to be determined				
Total	8/11	35	10	25	

=== Asia Cup ===
- 2013 – Preliminary round
- 2017 – 8th
- 2018 – 3rd
- 2019 – 7th
- 2022 – 5th
- 2023 – 12th
- 2024 – 7th
- 2025 – 4th
- 2026 – 4th

=== Asian Games ===
Year	Pos	Pld	W	L	Players
(Indonesia) 2018	5th	6	5	1	Sugimoto, Matsuwaki, Miyakoshi, Arakawa

== See also ==
- Japan men's national under-23 3x3 team
- Japan women's national 3x3 team
- Japan men's national basketball team
