= Jiang Jiayin =

Chinese basketball player (born 1995)

No. 21 – Jiangsu Phoenix
- Position: Small forward
- League: WCBA

Personal information
- Born: January 26, 1995 (age 31) Nanjing, Jiangsu, China
- Listed height: 5 ft 10 in (1.78 m)

Career information
- Playing career: 2013–present

Career history
- 2013–present: Jiangsu Phoenix
Medals
Women's 3x3 basketball
Representing China
World Cup
| Gold medal – first place | 2019 Amsterdam | Team |
Asian Games
| Gold medal – first place | 2018 Jakarta | Team |

Jiang Jiayin (Chinese: 姜佳音, born 26 January 1995) is a Chinese basketball player. She represented China at the 2018 FIBA 3x3 World Cup.
