= Paweł Pawłowski =

Polish basketball player (born 1982)

No. 44 – Decka Pelplin
- Position: Forward
- League: Poland 2

Personal information
- Born: 3 March 1982 (age 44) Gdańsk
- Listed height: 1.97 m (6 ft 6 in)
- Listed weight: 99 kg (218 lb)

Career information
- NBA draft: 2004: undrafted
Medals
Men's 3x3 basketball
Representing Poland
World Cup
Bronze medal – third place	2019 Amsterdam	Team
Europe Cup
Bronze medal – third place	2021 Paris

Paweł Pawłowski (born 3 March 1982) is a Polish basketball player for Decka Pelplin and the Polish 3x3 national team.

He represented Poland at the 2020 Summer Olympics.
