= Michael Hicks (basketball) =

American-Polish basketball player

KS Kosz Pleszew
- Positions: Shooting guard & Small forward
- League: II liga

Personal information
- Born: 17 June 1983 (age 43) Nashville, Tennessee, U.S.
- Listed height: 194 cm (6 ft 4 in)

Career information
- College: Central Missouri State
- Playing career: 2004–present

Career history
- 2004-2006: Central Missouri Mules
- 2006–2007: ALM Evreux Basket
- 2007: Mutlu Aku Selcuk Universitesi Konya
- 2007: Grises de Humacao
- 2008: Basket Kwidzyn
- 2008–2009: Polpharma Starogard Gdański
- 2009–2010: Phantoms Braunschweig
- 2010–2014: Polpharma Starogard Gdański
- 2014: Grises de Humacao
- 2015–2017: Polpharma Starogard Gdański
- 2017–2018: AZS Politechnika Kraków
- 2018–2019: Polpharma Starogard Gdański
- 2019: Decka Pelplin
- 2020: Polpharma Starogard Gdański
- 2020-2023: Wisła Kraków
- 2023–: KS Kosz Pleszew

Career highlights
- MIAA Individual: Conference MIAA Champion 2005; Regular season MIAA Champion 2005; MIAA MVP 2005; Central Missouri State Hall of Fame 2012; Polish Team: Polish Supercup (2011); Polish Cup 2011; PZKosz Cup 2017; PLK All-Star Game 2009, 2011; PLK 3-point challenge 2011, 2020; Polish Individual: MVP: Final Four PZKosz Cup 2017; TBL Month January 2016; TBL Round 14, 22 – 2015/16 & 24 – 2018/19; 3 point challenge: PLK, during Polish Cup 2020; During PZKosz Cup 2017; Statistics: PLK Free throw leader 2011; I liga top scorer 2018
Medals
Men's 3x3 basketball
Representing Poland
FIBA 3x3 World Cup
Bronze medal – third place	2019 Amsterdam

Michael Hicks (born 17 June 1983) is an American-Polish professional international basketball player, also specialising in the 3x3 format.

Having settled permanently and married in the country, he represented Poland in the 2019 3x3 World Cup in Amsterdam winning top scorer and the bronze medal, and at the 2020 Olympics in Tokyo.
