= Serbia at the 2020 Summer Olympics =

- IOC code: SRB
- NOC: Olympic Committee of Serbia
- Website: www.oks.org.rs (in Serbian)

in Tokyo, Japan 23 July 2021 – 8 August 2021
- Competitors: 87 (43 men and 44 women) in 15 sports
- Flag bearers (opening): Sonja Vasić; Filip Filipović
- Flag bearer (closing): Jovana Preković
- Medals Ranked 28th: Gold 3 Silver 1 Bronze 4 Total 8

Summer Olympics appearances (overview)
- 1912; 1920–2004; 2008; 2012; 2016; 2020; 2024

Other related appearances
- Yugoslavia (1920–1992 W); Independent Olympic Participants (1992 S); Serbia and Montenegro (1996–2006)

Serbia competed at the 2020 Summer Olympics in Tokyo. Originally scheduled to take place from 24 July to 9 August 2020, the Games were postponed to 23 July to 8 August 2021, due to the COVID-19 pandemic. It was the nation's fifth appearance at the Summer Olympics as an independent nation.

== Medalists ==
Medal	Name	Sport	Event	Date
Gold	Milica Mandić	Taekwondo	Women's +67 kg	27 July
Gold	Jovana Preković	Karate	Women's 61 kg	6 August
Gold	Serbia men's national water polo team: Gojko Pijetlović; Dušan Mandić; Nikola Dedović; Sava Ranđelović; Strahinja Rašović; Duško Pijetlović; Đorđe Lazić; Milan Aleksić; Nikola Jakšić; Filip Filipović; Andrija Prlainović; Stefan Mitrović; Branislav Mitrović	Water polo	Men's tournament	8 August
Silver	Damir Mikec	Shooting	Men's 10 m air pistol	24 July
Bronze	Tijana Bogdanović	Taekwondo	Women's 49 kg	24 July
Bronze	Serbia men's national 3x3 team: Dušan Domović Bulut; Dejan Majstorović; Aleksandar Ratkov; Mihailo Vasić	Basketball	Men's 3x3 tournament	28 July
Bronze	Milenko Sebić	Shooting	Men's 50 m rifle 3 positions	2 August
Bronze	Serbia women's national volleyball team: Bianka Buša; Mina Popović; Slađana Mirković; Brankica Mihajlović; Maja Ognjenović (c); Ana Bjelica; Maja Aleksić; Milena Rašić; Silvija Popović; Tijana Bošković; Bojana Milenković; Jelena Blagojević	Volleyball	Women's tournament	8 August

== Competitors ==
The following is the list of number of competitors participating in the Games:

Sport	Men	Women	Total
Athletics	2	3	5
Basketball	4	12	16
Boxing	0	1	1
Canoeing	2	1	3
Judo	2	3	5
Karate	0	1	1
Rowing	2	1	3
Shooting	3	4	7
Swimming	6	1	7
Table tennis	3	0	3
Taekwondo	0	2	2
Tennis	2	3	5
Volleyball	0	12	12
Water polo	13	0	13
Wrestling	4	0	4
Total	43	44	87

== Athletics ==
Serbian athletes further achieved the entry standards, either by qualifying time or by world ranking, in the following track and field events (up to a maximum of 3 athletes in each event):

Key

- Note–Ranks given for track events are within the athlete's heat only
- Q = Qualified for the next round
- q = Qualified for the next round as a fastest loser or, in field events, by position without achieving the qualifying target
- NR = National record
- N/A = Round not applicable for the event
- Bye = Athlete not required to compete in round

Field events

Athlete	Event	Qualification		Final	
Athlete	Event	Distance	Position	Distance	Position
Asmir Kolašinac	Men's shot put	19.68	29	Did not advance	
Armin Sinančević	Men's shot put	20.96	10 q	20.89	7
Ivana Španović	Women's long jump	7.00	1 Q	6.91	4
Dragana Tomašević	Women's discus throw	56.95	26	Did not advance	
Marija Vučenović	Women's javelin throw	58.93	20	Did not advance	

== Basketball ==
=== Indoor ===
Summary

Team	Event	Group stage				Quarterfinal	Semifinal	Final / BM	
Team	Event	Opposition Score	Opposition Score	Opposition Score	Rank	Opposition Score	Opposition Score	Opposition Score	Rank
Serbia women's	Women's tournament	Canada; W 72–68	Spain; L 70–85	South Korea; W 65–61	2 QF	China; W 77–70	United States; L 59–79	France; L 76–91	4

==== Women's tournament ====
Serbia women's basketball team qualified for the Olympics as one of two highest-ranked eligible squads from group A at the Belgrade meet of the 2020 FIBA Women's Olympic Qualifying Tournament.

Team roster

Serbia women's national basketball team – 2020 Summer Olympics roster
Players
Coaches

Pos.	No.	Name	Age – Date of birth	Height	Club	Ctr.
SF	5	Sonja Vasić	32 – 18 February 1989	1.89 m (6 ft 2 in)	Spar Girona	(Spain)
SG	6	Saša Čađo	32 – 13 July 1989	1.78 m (5 ft 10 in)	Carolo Basket	(France)
SG	8	Nevena Jovanović	31 – 30 June 1990	1.79 m (5 ft 10 in)	Sopron Basket	(Hungary)
PF	9	Jelena Brooks	32 – 28 April 1989	1.90 m (6 ft 3 in)	Sopron Basket	(Hungary)
G	10	Dajana Butulija	35 – 23 February 1986	1.75 m (5 ft 9 in)	Ślęza Wrocław	(Poland)
PF	11	Aleksandra Crvendakić	25 – 17 March 1996	1.87 m (6 ft 2 in)	ASVEL Féminin	(France)
PG	12	Yvonne Anderson	31 – 8 March 1990	1.75 m (5 ft 9 in)	Reyer Venezia	(Italy)
C	14	Dragana Stanković	26 – 18 January 1995	1.96 m (6 ft 5 in)	USK Praha	(Czech Republic)
SG	23	Ana Dabović	31 – 18 August 1989	1.83 m (6 ft 0 in)	Basket Lattes	(France)
PF	24	Maja Škorić	31 – 10 November 1989	1.84 m (6 ft 0 in)	KSC Szekszárd	(Hungary)
PF	32	Angela Dugalić	19 – 29 December 2001	1.93 m (6 ft 4 in)	Oregon Ducks	(United States)
C	33	Tina Krajišnik	30 – 12 January 1991	1.90 m (6 ft 3 in)	Galatasaray	(Turkey)

Head coach

- (Serbia) Marina Maljković

Assistant coach(es)

- (Serbia) Miloš Pađen
- (Serbia) Vladimir Vuksanović

Legend

- Club – describes last
  club before the tournament
- Age – describes age
  on 26 July 2021

Group play

Pos	Team	Pld	W	L	PF	PA	PD	Pts	Qualification
1	Spain	3	3	0	234	205	+29	6	Quarterfinals
2	Serbia	3	2	1	207	214	−7	5	Quarterfinals
3	Canada	3	1	2	208	201	+7	4	
4	South Korea	3	0	3	183	212	−29	3	

Source: TOCOG and FIBA
Rules for classification: 1) classification points; 2) head-to-head results; 3) head-to-head game points difference; 4) head-to-head number of game points scored.

26 July 2021
17:20
v

Boxscore

Serbia	72–68	Canada
Scoring by quarter: 16–13, 20–15, 9–17, 27–23
Pts: Vasić 16; Rebs: Dabović 6 Asts: Crvendakić, Dabović 5		Pts: Fields 19; Rebs: Nurse 6 Asts: Achonwa 5

Saitama Super Arena, Saitama
Referees: Amy Bonner (USA), Leandro Lezcano (ARG), Maj Forsberg (DEN)

29 July 2021
17:20
v

Boxscore

Spain	85–70	Serbia
Scoring by quarter: 19–20, 22–24, 18–14, 26–12
Pts: Ndour 20; Rebs: Ndour 9 Asts: Ouviña 8		Pts: Brooks 16; Rebs: Anderson 8 Asts: three players 4

Saitama Super Arena, Saitama
Referees: Yohan Rosso (FRA), Maj Forsberg (DEN), Andreia Silva (BRA)

1 August 2021
21:00
v

Boxscore

South Korea	61–65	Serbia
Scoring by quarter: 10–17, 14–15, 20–18, 17–15
Pts: Park Ji-h 17; Rebs: Park Ji-s. 11; Asts: Park Ji-h., Park Ji-s. 5		Pts: Crvendakić 15; Rebs: Vasić 10; Asts: three players 4

Saitama Super Arena, Saitama
Referees: Ferdinand Pascual (PHI), Amy Bonner (USA), Andreia Silva (BRA)

Quarterfinal

4 August 2021
10:00
v

Boxscore

China	70–77	Serbia
Scoring by quarter: 14–16, 19–19, 25–14, 12–28
Pts: Shao 17; Rebs: Han 7 Asts: Li Yua. 6		Pts: Brooks 18; Rebs: Vasić 10; Asts: Dabović 6

Saitama Super Arena, Saitama
Referees: Luis Castillo (ESP), Maripier Malo (CAN), Rabah Noujaim (LIB)

Semifinal

6 August 2021
13:40
v

Boxscore

United States	79–59	Serbia
Scoring by quarter: 25–12, 16–11, 17–16, 21–20
Pts: Griner 15; Rebs: Griner 12; Asts: Bird, Taurasi 4		Pts: Anderson 15; Rebs: Dugalić 10; Asts: Vasić 3

Saitama Super Arena, Saitama
Referees: Antonio Conde (ESP), Yu Jung (TPE), Andreia Silva (BRA)

Bronze medal game

7 August 2021
16:00
v

Boxscore

Serbia	76–91	France
Scoring by quarter: 23–19, 17–24, 16–24, 20–24
Pts: Anderson 24; Rebs: Vasić 8 Asts: Anderson, Brooks 5		Pts: Williams 17; Rebs: Williams 8 Asts: three players 4

Saitama Super Arena, Saitama
Referees: Juan Fernández (ARG), Amy Bonner (USA), Takaki Kato (JPN)

=== 3x3 basketball ===
Summary

Team	Event	Group stage								Quarterfinal	Semifinal	Final / BM	
Team	Event	Opposition Score	Opposition Score	Opposition Score	Opposition Score	Opposition Score	Opposition Score	Opposition Score	Rank	Opposition Score	Opposition Score	Opposition Score	Rank
Serbia men's	Men's tournament	China; W 22–13	Netherlands; W 16–15	Poland; W 15–12	Belgium; W 21–14	Japan; W 21–11	Latvia; W 22–16	ROC; W 21–10	1 SF	Bye	ROC; L 10–21	Belgium; W 21–10	3rd place, bronze medalist(s)

==== Men's tournament ====
Serbia men's national 3x3 team qualified directly for the Olympics by securing an outright berth, as one of the three highest-ranked squads, in the men's category of the FIBA rankings.

Team roster

Head coach: Goran Vojkić

- Dušan Domović Bulut
- Dejan Majstorović
- Aleksandar Ratkov
- Mihailo Vasić

Group play

Pos	Team	Pld	W	L	PF	PA	PD	Qualification
1	Serbia	7	7	0	138	91	+47	Semifinals
2	Belgium	7	4 (Note: Belgium 2–0, Latvia 1–1, Netherlands 0–2)	3	126	127	−1	Semifinals
3	Latvia	7	4	3	133	129	+4	Quarterfinals
4	Netherlands	7	4	3	132	129	+3	Quarterfinals
5	ROC	7	3	4	116	125	−9	Quarterfinals
6	Japan (H)	7	2 (Note: Japan 1–1, 123 PS; Poland 1–1, 120 PS; China 1–1, 119 PS)	5	123	134	−11	Quarterfinals
7	Poland	7	2	5	120	130	−10	
8	China	7	2	5	119	142	−23	

Source: TOCOG and FIBA
Rules for classification: 1) Wins; 2) Head-to-head record; 3) Points scored.
(H) Hosts
Notes:

24 July 2021
12:00
v

Report

China	13–22	Serbia
Pts: Hu 6		Pts: Domović Bulut 11

Aomi Urban Sports Park, Tokyo
Referees: Marek Maliszewski (POL), Glenn Tuitt (USA)

24 July 2021
15:25
v

Report

Serbia	16–15	Netherlands
Pts: Vasić 5		Pts: Voorn 6

Aomi Urban Sports Park, Tokyo
Referees: Edmond Ho (HKG), Marek Maliszewski (POL)

25 July 2021
12:00
v

Report

Poland	12–15	Serbia
Pts: Pawłowski 4		Pts: Vasić 5

Aomi Urban Sports Park, Tokyo
Referees: Evgeny Ostrovskiy (RUS), Markos Michaelides (SUI)

25 July 2021
15:25
v

Report

Serbia	21–14	Belgium
Pts: Domović Bulut 13		Pts: Bogaerts 6

Aomi Urban Sports Park, Tokyo
Referees: Markos Michaelides (SUI), Cecília Tóth (HUN)

26 July 2021
12:00
v

Report

Serbia	21–11	Japan
Pts: Domović Bulut 7		Pts: Yasuoka 8

Aomi Urban Sports Park, Tokyo
Referees: Edmond Ho (HKG), Glenn Tuitt (USA)

26 July 2021
15:25
v

Report

Latvia	16–22	Serbia
Pts: three players 5		Pts: Majstorović 11

Aomi Urban Sports Park, Tokyo
Referees: Edmond Ho (HKG), Marek Maliszewski (POL)

27 July 2021
18:00
v

Report

Serbia	21–10	ROC
Pts: Vasić 8		Pts: Karpenkov 5

Aomi Urban Sports Park, Tokyo
Referees: Markos Michaelides (SUI), Cecília Tóth (HUN)

Semifinal

28 July 2021
17:30
v

Report

Serbia	10–21	ROC
Pts: Domović Bulut 5		Pts: Zuev 11

Aomi Urban Sports Park, Tokyo
Referees: Marek Maliszewski (POL), Markos Michaelides (SUI)

Bronze medal match

28 July 2021
21:15
v

Report

Serbia	21–10	Belgium
Pts: Domović Bulut 7		Pts: Vervoort 5

Aomi Urban Sports Park, Tokyo
Referees: Edmond Ho (HKG), Marek Maliszewski (POL)

== Boxing ==
Serbia entered one boxer into the Olympic tournament for the first time at the Games. Nina Radovanović topped the list of boxers vying for qualification from Europe in the women's flyweight category based on the IOC's Boxing Task Force Rankings.

Athlete	Event	Round of 32	Round of 16	Quarterfinals	Semifinals	Final	
Athlete	Event	Opposition Result	Opposition Result	Opposition Result	Opposition Result	Opposition Result	Rank
Nina Radovanović	Women's flyweight	Bujold (CAN); W 5–0	Havrayimana (BDI); W 5–0	Huang H-w (TPE); L 0–5	Did not advance		

== Canoeing ==
=== Sprint ===
Serbian canoeists qualified three boats in each of the following distances for the Games through the 2019 ICF Canoe Sprint World Championships in Szeged, Hungary.

Athlete	Event	Heats		Quarterfinals		Semifinals		Final	
Athlete	Event	Time	Rank	Time	Rank	Time	Rank	Time	Rank
Strahinja Stefanović	Men's K-1 200 m	34.996	1 SF	Bye		35.855	5 FB	36.329	11
Bojan Zdelar	Men's K-1 200 m	37.092	5 QF	36.531	4	Did not advance			
Bojan Zdelar	Men's K-1 1000 m	3:45.074	2 SF	Bye		3:29.525	8 FB	3:31.689	16
Milica Novaković	Women's K-1 200 m	41.579	3 QF	41.340	2 SF	40.257	6 FB	40.527	13
Milica Novaković	Women's K-1 500 m	1:49.802	5 QF	1:49.348	1 SF	1:53.149	3 FB	1:54.458	12

Qualification Legend: FA = Qualify to final (medal); FB = Qualify to final B (non-medal); FC = Qualify to final C (non-medal)

== Judo ==
Serbia qualified five judoka (two men and three women) for each of the following weight classes at the Games. 2017 world champion Nemanja Majdov (men's middleweight, 90 kg), Rio 2016 Olympian Aleksandar Kukolj (men's half-heavyweight, 100 kg), Milica Nikolić (women's extra-lightweight, 48 kg), and Marica Perišić (women's lightweight, 57 kg) were selected among the top 18 judoka of their respective weight classes based on the IJF World Ranking List of June 28, 2021, while Anja Obradović (women's haf-middleweight, 63 kg) accepted a continental berth from Europe as the nation's top-ranked judoka outside of direct qualifying position.

Athlete	Event	Round of 64	Round of 32	Round of 16	Quarterfinals	Semifinals	Repechage	Final / BM	
Athlete	Event	Opposition Result	Opposition Result	Opposition Result	Opposition Result	Opposition Result	Opposition Result	Opposition Result	Rank
Nemanja Majdov	Men's −90 kg	Bye	Trippel (GER); L 00–01	Did not advance					
Aleksandar Kukolj	Men's −100 kg	—N/a	Takayawa (FIJ); W 10–00	Cho G-h (KOR); L 00–10	Did not advance				
Milica Nikolić	Women's −48 kg	—N/a	Boukli (FRA); W 10–00	Bilodid (UKR); L 00–01	Did not advance				
Marica Perišić	Women's −57 kg	—N/a	Aldass (EOR); W 10–00	Nelson-Levy (ISR); L 00–10	Did not advance				
Anja Obradović	Women's −63 kg	—N/a	Franssen (NED); L 00–10	Did not advance					

== Karate ==
Serbia entered one karateka into the inaugural Olympic tournament. 2018 world champion Jovana Preković qualified directly for the women's kumite 61-kg category by finishing among the top four karateka at the end of the combined WKF Olympic Rankings.

Athlete	Event	Group stage					Semifinal	Final / BM	
Athlete	Event	Opposition Result	Opposition Result	Opposition Result	Opposition Result	Rank	Opposition Result	Opposition Result	Rank
Jovana Preković	Women's −61 kg	Sadini (MAR); W 3–1	Grande (PER); W 1–0	Serogina (UKR); W 6–4	Farouk (EGY); W 1–1 ^{S}	1 Q	Çoban (TUR); W 2–0	Yin Xy (CHN); W 0–0 ^{H}	1st place, gold medalist(s)

== Rowing ==
Serbia qualified one boat in the men's pair for the Games by topping the B-final and securing seventh out of eleven berths available at the 2019 FISA World Championships in Ottensheim, Austria. Meanwhile, the women's single sculls rower added one boat for the Serbian roster with a bronze-medal finish in the A-final at the 2021 European Continental Qualification Regatta in Varese, Italy.

Athlete	Event	Heats		Repechage		Quarterfinals		Semifinals		Final	
Athlete	Event	Time	Rank	Time	Rank	Time	Rank	Time	Rank	Time	Rank
Martin Mačković; Miloš Vasić	Men's pair	6:43.18	3 SA/B	Bye		—N/a		6:17.47	2 FA	6:22.34	5
Jovana Arsić	Women's single sculls	7:46.74	3 QF	Bye		8:09.37	4 SC/D	7:39.26	2 FC	7:43.30	15

Qualification Legend: FA=Final A (medal); FB=Final B (non-medal); FC=Final C (non-medal); FD=Final D (non-medal); FE=Final E (non-medal); FF=Final F (non-medal); SA/B=Semifinals A/B; SC/D=Semifinals C/D; SE/F=Semifinals E/F; QF=Quarterfinals; R=Repechage

== Shooting ==
Serbian shooters achieved quota places for the following events by virtue of their best finishes at the 2018 ISSF World Championships, the 2019 ISSF World Cup series, European Championships or Games, and European Qualifying Tournament, as long as they obtained a minimum qualifying score (MQS) by June 6, 2021.

Men

Athlete	Event	Qualification		Final	
Athlete	Event	Points	Rank	Points	Rank
Damir Mikec	10 m air pistol	578	8 Q	237.9	2nd place, silver medalist(s)
Milenko Sebić	10 m air rifle	623.2	31	Did not advance	
Milenko Sebić	50 m rifle 3 positions	1180	4 Q	448.2	3rd place, bronze medalist(s)
Milutin Stefanović	10 m air rifle	621.3	38	Did not advance	
Milutin Stefanović	50 m rifle 3 positions	1164	23	Did not advance	

Women

Athlete	Event	Qualification		Final	
Athlete	Event	Points	Rank	Points	Rank
Andrea Arsović	10 m air rifle	623.3	29	Did not advance	
Andrea Arsović	50 m rifle 3 positions	1175	5 Q	402.4	8
Zorana Arunović	10 m air pistol	573	17	Did not advance	
Zorana Arunović	25 m pistol	584	9	Did not advance	
Jasmina Milovanović	10 m air pistol	566	33	Did not advance	
Jasmina Milovanović	25 m pistol	575	30	Did not advance	
Sanja Vukašinović	10 m air rifle	617.8	44	Did not advance	
Sanja Vukašinović	50 m rifle 3 positions	1161	25	Did not advance	

Mixed

Athlete	Event	Qualification		Semifinal		Final / BM	
Athlete	Event	Points	Rank	Points	Rank	Opposition Result	Rank
Damir Mikec; Zorana Arunović	10 m air pistol team	577	5 Q	384	4 q	Kostevych / Omelchuk (UKR); L 12–16	4
Milenko Sebić; Sanja Vukašinović	10 m air rifle team	612.4	29	Did not advance			
Milutin Stefanović; Andrea Arsović	10 m air rifle team	624.5	16	Did not advance			

== Swimming ==
Serbian swimmers further achieved qualifying standards in the following events (up to a maximum of 2 swimmers in each event at the Olympic Qualifying Time (OQT), and potentially 1 at the Olympic Selection Time (OST)):

Athlete	Event	Heat		Semifinal		Final	
Athlete	Event	Time	Rank	Time	Rank	Time	Rank
Andrej Barna	Men's 50 m freestyle	22.29	28	Did not advance			
Andrej Barna	Men's 100 m freestyle	48.30	13 Q	47.94 NR	9	Did not advance	
Vuk Čelić	Men's 800 m freestyle	8:04.85	33	—N/a		Did not advance	
Čaba Silađi	Men's 100 m breaststroke	1:00.19	26	Did not advance			
Velimir Stjepanović	Men's 200 m freestyle	1:46.26	14 Q	1:47.62	16	Did not advance	
Nikola Aćin; Andrej Barna; Uroš Nikolić; Velimir Stjepanović	Men's 4 × 100 m freestyle relay	3:13.71 NR	10	—N/a		Did not advance	
Anja Crevar	Women's 200 m individual medley	2:17.62	26	Did not advance			
Anja Crevar	Women's 400 m individual medley	4:40.50	10	—N/a		Did not advance	

== Table tennis ==
Serbia entered three athletes into the table tennis competition at the Games. The men's team secured a berth by advancing to the quarterfinal round of the 2020 World Olympic Qualification Event in Gondomar, Portugal, permitting a maximum of two starters to compete in the men's singles tournament.

Athlete	Event	Preliminary	Round 1	Round 2	Round 3	Round of 16	Quarterfinals	Semifinals	Final / BM	
Athlete	Event	Opposition Result	Opposition Result	Opposition Result	Opposition Result	Opposition Result	Opposition Result	Opposition Result	Opposition Result	Rank
Dimitrije Levajac	Men's singles	Bye	Skachkov (ROC); L 2–4	Did not advance						
Žolt Peto	Men's singles	Bye	Gionis (GRE); L 0–4	Did not advance						
Marko Jevtović; Dimitrije Levajac; Žolt Peto	Men's team	—N/a				Brazil; L 2–3	Did not advance			

== Taekwondo ==
Serbia entered two athletes into the taekwondo competition at the Games. Rio 2016 silver medalist Tijana Bogdanović (women's 49 kg) and London 2012 champion Milica Mandić (women's +67 kg) qualified directly for their respective weight classes by finishing among the top five taekwondo practitioners at the end of the WT Olympic Rankings.

Athlete	Event	Qualification	Round of 16	Quarterfinals	Semifinals	Repechage	Final / BM	
Athlete	Event	Opposition Result	Opposition Result	Opposition Result	Opposition Result	Opposition Result	Opposition Result	Rank
Tijana Bogdanović	Women's −49 kg	Bye	Cerezo (ESP); L 4–12	Did not advance		Wu Jy (CHN); W 12–9	Yamada (JPN); W 20–6	3rd place, bronze medalist(s)
Milica Mandić	Women's +67 kg	—N/a	Ogallo (KEN); W 13–0	Kowalczuk (POL); W 11–4	Laurin (FRA); W 7–5	Bye	Lee D-b (KOR); W 10–7	1st place, gold medalist(s)

== Tennis ==
Serbia entered five tennis players into the Olympic tournament. Beijing 2008 bronze medalist and world No. 1 Novak Djokovic and Miomir Kecmanović (world no. 47) qualified directly as one of the top 56 eligible players in the ATP World Rankings, while Nina Stojanović (world no. 85) and Ivana Jorović (world no. 90) did so for the women's singles based on their WTA World Rankings of June 13, 2021.

Athlete	Event	Round of 64	Round of 32	Round of 16	Quarterfinals	Semifinals	Final / BM	
Athlete	Event	Opposition Result	Opposition Result	Opposition Result	Opposition Result	Opposition Result	Opposition Result	Rank
Novak Djokovic	Men's singles	Dellien (BOL); W 6–2, 6–2	Struff (GER); W 6–4, 6–3	Davidovich Fokina (ESP); W 6–3, 6–1	Nishikori (JPN); W 6–2, 6–0	Zverev (GER); L 6–1, 3–6, 1–6	Carreño Busta (ESP); L 4–6, 7–6^{(8–6)}, 3–6	4
Miomir Kecmanović	Men's singles	Majchrzak (POL); W 6–4, 6–2	Humbert (FRA); L 6–4, 6–7^{(5–7)}, 5–7	Did not advance				
Ivana Jorović	Women's singles	van Uytvanck (BEL); L 3–6, 2–6	Did not advance					
Nina Stojanović	Women's singles	Hibino (JPN); W 6–3, 6–3	Sakkari (GRE); L 1–6, 2–6	Did not advance				
Aleksandra Krunić; Nina Stojanović	Women's doubles	—N/a	Xu Yf / Yang Zx (CHN); L 6–4, 4–6, [16–18]	Did not advance				
Novak Djokovic; Nina Stojanović	Mixed doubles	—N/a		Stefani / Melo (BRA); W 6–3, 6–4	Siegemund / Krawietz (GER); W 6–1, 6–2	Vesnina / Karatsev (ROC); L 6–7^{(4–7)}, 5–7	Barty / Peers (AUS); L WO	4

== Volleyball ==
=== Indoor ===
Summary

Team	Event	Group stage						Quarterfinal	Semifinal	Final / BM	
Team	Event	Opposition Score	Opposition Score	Opposition Score	Opposition Score	Opposition Score	Rank	Opposition Score	Opposition Score	Opposition Score	Rank
Serbia women's	Women's tournament	Dominican Republic; W 3–0	Japan; W 3–0	Kenya; W 3–0	Brazil; L 1–3	South Korea; W 3–0	2 QF	Italy; W 3–0	United States; L 0–3	South Korea; W 3–0	3rd place, bronze medalist(s)

==== Women's tournament ====
Serbia women's volleyball team qualified for the Olympics by securing an outright berth as the highest-ranked nation for pool A at the Intercontinental Olympic Qualification Tournament in Wrocław, Poland.

Team roster

The following is the Serbian roster.

Head coach: Zoran Terzić

- 1 Bianka Buša OS
- 5 Mina Popović MB
- 8 Slađana Mirković S
- 9 Brankica Mihajlović OS
- 10 Maja Ognjenović (c) S
- 13 Ana Bjelica OP
- 14 Maja Aleksić MB
- 16 Milena Rašić MB
- 17 Silvija Popović L
- 18 Tijana Bošković OP
- 19 Bojana Milenković OS
- 20 Jelena Blagojević OS

Group play

Pos	Team	Pld	W	L	Pts	SW	SL	SR	SPW	SPL	SPR	Qualification
1	Brazil	5	5	0	14	15	3	5.000	434	315	1.378	Quarter-finals
2	Serbia	5	4	1	12	13	3	4.333	381	313	1.217	Quarter-finals
3	South Korea	5	3	2	7	9	10	0.900	374	415	0.901	Quarter-finals
4	Dominican Republic	5	2	3	8	10	10	1.000	411	406	1.012	Quarter-finals
5	Japan (H)	5	1	4	4	6	12	0.500	378	395	0.957	
6	Kenya	5	0	5	0	0	15	0.000	242	376	0.644	

Source: Tokyo 2020 and FIVB
Rules for classification: Tiebreakers
(H) Host

25 July 2021; 14:20	Serbia	3–0	Dominican Republic	Ariake Arena, Tokyo; Referees: Kang Joo-hee (KOR), Evgeny Makshanov (RUS)
25 July 2021; 14:20	(25–18, 25–12, 25–20); Results Statistics			Ariake Arena, Tokyo; Referees: Kang Joo-hee (KOR), Evgeny Makshanov (RUS)

27 July 2021; 14:20	Japan	0–3	Serbia	Ariake Arena, Tokyo; Referees: Patricia Rolf (USA), Juraj Mokrý (SVK)
27 July 2021; 14:20	(23–25, 16–25, 24–26); Results Statistics			Ariake Arena, Tokyo; Referees: Patricia Rolf (USA), Juraj Mokrý (SVK)

29 July 2021; 14:20	Serbia	3–0	Kenya	Ariake Arena, Tokyo; Referees: Hamid Al-Rousi (UAE), Sumie Myoi (JPN)
29 July 2021; 14:20	(25–21, 25–11, 25–20); Results Statistics			Ariake Arena, Tokyo; Referees: Hamid Al-Rousi (UAE), Sumie Myoi (JPN)

31 July 2021; 16:25	Serbia	1–3	Brazil	Ariake Arena, Tokyo; Referees: Fabrice Collados (FRA), Wojciech Maroszek (POL)
31 July 2021; 16:25	(20–25, 16–25, 25–23, 19–25); Results Statistics			Ariake Arena, Tokyo; Referees: Fabrice Collados (FRA), Wojciech Maroszek (POL)

2 August 2021; 09:00	Serbia	3–0	South Korea	Ariake Arena, Tokyo; Referees: Evgeny Makshanov (RUS), Sumie Myoi (JPN)
2 August 2021; 09:00	(25–18, 25–17, 25–15); Results Statistics			Ariake Arena, Tokyo; Referees: Evgeny Makshanov (RUS), Sumie Myoi (JPN)

Quarterfinal

4 August 2021; 17:00	Serbia	3–0	Italy	Ariake Arena, Tokyo; Referees: Paulo Turci (BRA), Evgeny Makshanov (RUS)
4 August 2021; 17:00	(25–21, 25–14, 25–21); Results Statistics			Ariake Arena, Tokyo; Referees: Paulo Turci (BRA), Evgeny Makshanov (RUS)

Semifinal

6 August 2021; 13:00	Serbia	0–3	United States	Ariake Arena, Tokyo; Referees: Hernán Casamiquela (ARG), Susana Rodríguez (ESP)
6 August 2021; 13:00	(19–25, 15–25, 23–25); Results Statistics			Ariake Arena, Tokyo; Referees: Hernán Casamiquela (ARG), Susana Rodríguez (ESP)

Bronze medal match

8 August 2021; 09:00	South Korea	0–3	Serbia	Ariake Arena, Tokyo; Referees: Daniele Rapisarda (ITA), Patricia Rolf (USA)
8 August 2021; 09:00	(18–25, 15–25, 15–25); Results Statistics			Ariake Arena, Tokyo; Referees: Daniele Rapisarda (ITA), Patricia Rolf (USA)

== Water polo ==
Summary

Key:
- FT – After full time.
- P – Match decided by penalty-shootout.

Team	Event	Group stage						Quarterfinal	Semifinal	Final / BM	
Team	Event	Opposition Score	Opposition Score	Opposition Score	Opposition Score	Opposition Score	Rank	Opposition Score	Opposition Score	Opposition Score	Rank
Serbia men's	Men's tournament	Spain; L 12–13	Kazakhstan; W 19–5	Australia; W 14–8	Croatia; L 12–14	Montenegro; W 13–6	3 QF	Italy; W 10–6	Spain; W 10–9	Greece; W 13–10	1st place, gold medalist(s)

=== Men's tournament ===
Serbian men's water polo team qualified for the Olympics by winning the gold medal and securing an outright berth at the 2019 FINA World League Super Final in Belgrade.

Team roster

Serbia's final squad was announced on 8 July 2021.

Head coach: Dejan Savić

No.	Player	Pos.	L/R	Height	Weight	Date of birth (age)	Apps	OG/ Goals	Club	Ref
1	Gojko Pijetlović	GK	R	1.94 m (6 ft 4 in)	92 kg (203 lb)	7 August 1983 (aged 37)	270	2/0	(Serbia) Novi Beograd	
2	Dušan Mandić	D	L	2.02 m (6 ft 8 in)	105 kg (231 lb)	16 June 1994 (aged 27)	194	2/13	(Serbia) Novi Beograd	
3	Nikola Dedović	D	R	1.89 m (6 ft 2 in)	92 kg (203 lb)	25 January 1992 (aged 29)	29	0/0	(Germany) Spandau 04	
4	Sava Ranđelović	CB	R	1.93 m (6 ft 4 in)	98 kg (216 lb)	17 July 1993 (aged 28)	166	1/2	(Hungary) Vasas	
5	Đorđe Lazić	CF	R	1.94 m (6 ft 4 in)	95 kg (209 lb)	19 May 1996 (aged 25)	34	0/0	(Italy) Brescia	
6	Duško Pijetlović	CF	R	1.97 m (6 ft 6 in)	97 kg (214 lb)	25 April 1985 (aged 36)	452	3/29	(Serbia) Novi Beograd	
7	Strahinja Rašović	D	R	1.88 m (6 ft 2 in)	85 kg (187 lb)	9 March 1992 (aged 29)	84	0/0	(Serbia) Novi Beograd	
8	Milan Aleksić	CB	R	1.93 m (6 ft 4 in)	96 kg (212 lb)	13 May 1986 (aged 35)	259	2/9	(Serbia) Partizan	
9	Nikola Jakšić	CB	R	1.97 m (6 ft 6 in)	91 kg (201 lb)	17 January 1997 (aged 24)	99	1/4	(Serbia) Novi Beograd	
10	Filip Filipović (C)	D	L	1.96 m (6 ft 5 in)	101 kg (223 lb)	2 May 1987 (aged 34)	652	3/41	(Greece) Olympiacos	
11	Andrija Prlainović	D	R	1.87 m (6 ft 2 in)	93 kg (205 lb)	28 April 1987 (aged 34)	325	3/31	(France) Marseille	
12	Stefan Mitrović	D	R	1.95 m (6 ft 5 in)	91 kg (201 lb)	29 March 1988 (aged 33)	256	2/18	(Serbia) Partizan	
13	Branislav Mitrović	GK	R	2.01 m (6 ft 7 in)	100 kg (220 lb)	30 January 1985 (aged 36)	163	1/0	(Hungary) Vasas	
Average				1.94 m (6 ft 4 in)	95 kg (209 lb)	31 years, 234 days	229			

Note: Age as of 23 July 2021
Source: Serbia Men | Tokyo 2020 Olympics Archived 2021-07-22 at the Wayback Machine

Group play

Pos	Team	Pld	W	D	L	GF	GA	GD	Pts	Qualification
1	Spain	5	5	0	0	61	31	+30	10	Quarterfinals
2	Croatia	5	3	0	2	62	46	+16	6 (Note: Croatia 14–12 Serbia)	Quarterfinals
3	Serbia	5	3	0	2	70	46	+24	6	Quarterfinals
4	Montenegro	5	2	0	3	54	56	−2	4 (Note: Australia 10–15 Montenegro)	Quarterfinals
5	Australia	5	2	0	3	49	60	−11	4	
6	Kazakhstan	5	0	0	5	35	92	−57	0	

Source: Tokyo 2020 and FINA
Rules for classification: 1) Points; 2) Head-to-head points; 3) Head-to-head goal difference; 4) Head-to-head goals scored; 5) Goal difference.
Notes:

25 July 2021; 18:20 v	Report	Serbia	12–13	Spain	Tokyo Tatsumi International Swimming Center; Referees: Michael Goldenberg (USA), Georgios Stavridis (GRE)
25 July 2021; 18:20 v	Report	Score by quarters: 3–3, 3–5, 3–2, 3–3			Tokyo Tatsumi International Swimming Center; Referees: Michael Goldenberg (USA), Georgios Stavridis (GRE)
25 July 2021; 18:20 v	Report	four players 2	Goals	Munarriz 4	Tokyo Tatsumi International Swimming Center; Referees: Michael Goldenberg (USA), Georgios Stavridis (GRE)

27 July 2021; 14:00 v	Report	Kazakhstan	5–19	Serbia	Tokyo Tatsumi International Swimming Center; Referees: Adrian Alexandrescu (ROU), György Kun (HUN)
27 July 2021; 14:00 v	Report	Score by quarters: 2–4, 1–3, 2–6, 0–6			Tokyo Tatsumi International Swimming Center; Referees: Adrian Alexandrescu (ROU), György Kun (HUN)
27 July 2021; 14:00 v	Report	Medvedev, Vuksanović 2	Goals	Pijetlović 4	Tokyo Tatsumi International Swimming Center; Referees: Adrian Alexandrescu (ROU), György Kun (HUN)

29 July 2021; 19:50 v	Report	Serbia	14–8	Australia	Tokyo Tatsumi International Swimming Center; Referees: Frank Ohme (GER), Georgios Stavridis (GRE)
29 July 2021; 19:50 v	Report	Score by quarters: 6–0, 4–1, 1–2, 3–5			Tokyo Tatsumi International Swimming Center; Referees: Frank Ohme (GER), Georgios Stavridis (GRE)
29 July 2021; 19:50 v	Report	Mandić 4	Goals	B. Edwards 2	Tokyo Tatsumi International Swimming Center; Referees: Frank Ohme (GER), Georgios Stavridis (GRE)

31 July 2021; 15:30 v	Report	Croatia	14–12	Serbia	Tokyo Tatsumi International Swimming Center; Referees: Michael Goldenberg (USA), Michiel Zwart (NED)
31 July 2021; 15:30 v	Report	Score by quarters: 5–3, 1–1, 4–4, 4–4			Tokyo Tatsumi International Swimming Center; Referees: Michael Goldenberg (USA), Michiel Zwart (NED)
31 July 2021; 15:30 v	Report	Joković, Obradović 4	Goals	Jakšić 3	Tokyo Tatsumi International Swimming Center; Referees: Michael Goldenberg (USA), Michiel Zwart (NED)

2 August 2021; 14:00 v	Report	Serbia	13–6	Montenegro	Tokyo Tatsumi International Swimming Center; Referees: Alessandro Severo (ITA), Frank Ohme (GER)
2 August 2021; 14:00 v	Report	Score by quarters: 6–1, 2–1, 3–2, 2–2			Tokyo Tatsumi International Swimming Center; Referees: Alessandro Severo (ITA), Frank Ohme (GER)
2 August 2021; 14:00 v	Report	Filipović 3	Goals	Ivović 3	Tokyo Tatsumi International Swimming Center; Referees: Alessandro Severo (ITA), Frank Ohme (GER)

Quarterfinal

4 August 2021; 18:20 v	Report	Italy	6–10	Serbia	Tokyo Tatsumi International Swimming Center; Referees: Arkadiy Voevodin (RUS), Georgios Stavridis (GRE)
4 August 2021; 18:20 v	Report	Score by quarters: 2–5, 1–4, 1–0, 2–1			Tokyo Tatsumi International Swimming Center; Referees: Arkadiy Voevodin (RUS), Georgios Stavridis (GRE)
4 August 2021; 18:20 v	Report	Presciutti 2	Goals	Filipović 3	Tokyo Tatsumi International Swimming Center; Referees: Arkadiy Voevodin (RUS), Georgios Stavridis (GRE)

Semifinal

6 August 2021; 19:50 v	Report	Serbia	10–9	Spain	Tokyo Tatsumi International Swimming Center; Referees: Adrian Alexandrescu (ROU), Michiel Zwart (NED)
6 August 2021; 19:50 v	Report	Score by quarters: 2–0, 2–5, 1–2, 5–2			Tokyo Tatsumi International Swimming Center; Referees: Adrian Alexandrescu (ROU), Michiel Zwart (NED)
6 August 2021; 19:50 v	Report	Mandić 3	Goals	three players 2	Tokyo Tatsumi International Swimming Center; Referees: Adrian Alexandrescu (ROU), Michiel Zwart (NED)

Gold medal game

8 August 2021; 16:30 v	Report	Greece	10–13	Serbia	Tokyo Tatsumi International Swimming Center; Referees: Michael Goldenberg (USA), Xevi Buch (ESP)
8 August 2021; 16:30 v	Report	Score by quarters: 3–6, 4–2, 2–2, 1–3			Tokyo Tatsumi International Swimming Center; Referees: Michael Goldenberg (USA), Xevi Buch (ESP)
8 August 2021; 16:30 v	Report	three players 2	Goals	three players 3	Tokyo Tatsumi International Swimming Center; Referees: Michael Goldenberg (USA), Xevi Buch (ESP)

== Wrestling ==
Serbia qualified four wrestlers for each of the following classes into the Olympic competition. Three of them finished among the top six to book Olympic spots in the men's freestyle (57 kg) and the men's Greco-Roman (67 and 97 kg) at the 2019 World Championships, while an additional license was awarded to the Serbian wrestler, who progressed to the top two finals of the men's Greco-Roman 87 kg at the 2021 World Qualification Tournament in Sofia, Bulgaria.

Zurabi Datunashvili was stripped of the Olympic bronze medal in November 2025. The medal was subsequently awarded to Croatia's Ivan Huklek. CAS confirmed that all results achieved by Datunashvili since May 27, 2021 are invalid. These results include both the bronze medal the athlete won at the 2020 Tokyo Olympics and the gold medals won at the 2021 and 2022 UWW World Championships.

Key:

- VF (ranking points: 5–0 or 0–5) – Victory by fall.
- VB (ranking points: 5–0 or 0–5) – Victory by injury (VF for forfeit, VA for withdrawal or disqualification)
- PP (ranking points: 3–1 or 1–3) – Decision by points – the loser with technical points.
- PO (ranking points: 3–0 or 0–3) – Decision by points – the loser without technical points.
- ST (ranking points: 4–0 or 0–4) – Great superiority – the loser without technical points and a margin of victory of at least 8 (Greco-Roman) or 10 (freestyle) points.
- SP (ranking points: 4–1 or 1–4) – Technical superiority – the loser with technical points and a margin of victory of at least 8 (Greco-Roman) or 10 (freestyle) points.

Freestyle

Athlete	Event	Round of 16	Quarterfinal	Semifinal	Repechage	Final / BM	
Athlete	Event	Opposition Result	Opposition Result	Opposition Result	Opposition Result	Opposition Result	Rank
Stevan Mićić	Men's –57 kg	Takahashi (JPN); L 0–3 ^{PO}	Did not advance				14

Greco-Roman

Athlete	Event	Round of 16	Quarterfinal	Semifinal	Repechage	Final / BM	
Athlete	Event	Opposition Result	Opposition Result	Opposition Result	Opposition Result	Opposition Result	Rank
Mate Nemeš	Men's –67 kg	Stäbler (GER); L 1–3 ^{PP}	Did not advance				13
Zurab Datunashvili	Men's –87 kg	Beleniuk (UKR); L 1–3 ^{PP}	Did not advance		Sid Azara (ALG); W 3–1 ^{PP}	Huklek (CRO); W 3–1 ^{PP}	DQ
Mikheil Kajaia	Men's –97 kg	Hancock (USA); L 1–3 ^{PP}	Did not advance				14
