= Basketball at the 2020 Summer Olympics – Men's 3x3 tournament =

Tournament details
- Host country: Japan
- City: Tokyo
- Dates: 24–28 July 2021
- Teams: 8 (from 2 confederations)
- Venue: 1 (in 1 host city)

Final positions
- Champions: Latvia (1st title)
- Runners-up: ROC
- Third place: Serbia
- Fourth place: Belgium

The 2020 Summer Olympics men's 3x3 basketball tournament in Tokyo, began on 24 and ended on 28 July 2021. All games were played at the Aomi Urban Sports Park.

It was originally scheduled to be held in 2020, but on 24 March 2020, the Olympics were postponed to 2021 due to the COVID-19 pandemic. As a result of this pandemic, the games were played behind closed doors.

Latvia won the title after defeating the Russian Olympic Committee team in the final, while Serbia captured the bronze medal over Belgium.

The medals for the competition were presented by Nenad Lalović, Serbia; IOC Executive Board Member, and the medalists' bouquets were presented by Andreas Zagklis, Greece; FIBA Secretary General.

== Format ==
The eight teams played a round robin. The teams placed first and second in group qualified for the semi-finals. The teams three to six played a playoff. After that, a knockout system was used.

== Competition schedule ==
Legend
G	Group stage	¼	Quarter-finals	½	Semi-finals	B	Bronze medal match	F	Gold medal match

Sat 24	Sun 25	Mon 26	Tue 27		Wed 28		
G	G	G	G	1/4	1/2	B	F

== Qualification ==
Means of qualification	Date(s)	Location	Berth(s)	Qualifier(s)
Host nation	—N/a	—N/a	1	Japan
FIBA 3x3 World Ranking	1 November 2019	(Japan) Utsunomiya	3	China; ROC; Serbia
2021 FIBA 3x3 Olympic Qualifying Tournament	26–30 May 2021	(Austria) Graz	3	Poland; Netherlands; Latvia
2021 FIBA Universality Olympic Qualifying Tournament	4–6 June 2021	(Hungary) Debrecen	1	Belgium
Total			8	

== Roster ==
Team	Players				Head Coach
Serbia	Dušan Domović Bulut	Dejan Majstorović	Aleksandar Ratkov	Mihailo Vasić	Goran Vojkić
ROC	Ilia Karpenkov	Kirill Pisklov	Stanislav Sharov	Alexander Zuev	
Latvia	Agnis Čavars	Edgars Krūmiņš	Kārlis Lasmanis	Nauris Miezis	Raimonds Feldmanis
Netherlands	Ross Bekkering	Dimeo van der Horst	Arvin Slagter	Jessey Voorn	Brian Benjamin
China	Hu Jinqiu	Gao Shiyan	Li Haonan	Yan Peng	
Japan	Ira Brown	Tomoya Ochiai	Keisei Tominaga	Ryuto Yasuoka	Torsten Loibl
Poland	Michael Hicks	Paweł Pawłowski	Szymon Rduch	Przemysław Zamojski	Piotr Renkiel
Belgium	Rafael Bogaerts	Nick Celis	Thierry Mariën	Thibaut Vervoort	

== Referees ==
The following 12 referees were selected for the tournament.

- (Australia) Vanessa Devlin
- (China) Shi Qirong
- (Chinese Taipei) Su Yu-yen
- (Egypt) Sara El-Sharnouby
- (Hong Kong) Edmond Ho
- (Hungary) Cecília Tóth
- (Poland) Marek Maliszewski
- (Romania) Vlad Ghizdareanu
- (Russia) Evgeny Ostrovskiy
- (Serbia) Jasmina Juras
- (Switzerland) Markos Michaelides
- (United States) Glenn Tuitt

== Pool ==
=== Standings ===
Pos	Team	Pld	W	L	PF	PA	PD	Qualification
1	Serbia	7	7	0	138	91	+47	Semifinals
2	Belgium	7	4 (Note: Belgium 2–0, Latvia 1–1, Netherlands 0–2)	3	126	127	−1	Semifinals
3	Latvia	7	4	3	133	129	+4	Quarterfinals
4	Netherlands	7	4	3	132	129	+3	Quarterfinals
5	ROC	7	3	4	116	125	−9	Quarterfinals
6	Japan (H)	7	2 (Note: Japan 1–1, 123 PS; Poland 1–1, 120 PS; China 1–1, 119 PS)	5	123	134	−11	Quarterfinals
7	Poland	7	2	5	120	130	−10	
8	China	7	2	5	119	142	−23	

Source: TOCOG and FIBA
Rules for classification: 1) Wins; 2) Head-to-head record; 3) Points scored.
(H) Hosts
Notes:

All times are local (UTC+9).

=== Results ===
24 July 2021
11:35
v

Report

Poland	14–21	Latvia
Pts: Hicks 8		Pts: Miezis 7

Aomi Urban Sports Park, Tokyo
Referees: Markos Michaelides (SUI), Edmond Ho (HKG)

24 July 2021
12:00
v

Report

China	13–22	Serbia
Pts: Hu 6		Pts: Domović Bulut 11

Aomi Urban Sports Park, Tokyo
Referees: Marek Maliszewski (POL), Glenn Tuitt (USA)

24 July 2021
15:00
v

Report

ROC	21–13	China
Pts: Zuev 12		Pts: Hu 6

Aomi Urban Sports Park, Tokyo
Referees: Glenn Tuitt (USA), Cecília Tóth (HUN)

24 July 2021
15:25
v

Report

Serbia	16–15	Netherlands
Pts: Vasić 5		Pts: Voorn 6

Aomi Urban Sports Park, Tokyo
Referees: Edmond Ho (HKG), Marek Maliszewski (POL)

24 July 2021
18:40
v

Report

Latvia	20–21	Belgium
Pts: Lasmanis 11		Pts: Vervoort 11

Aomi Urban Sports Park, Tokyo
Referees: Markos Michaelides (SUI), Edmond Ho (HKG)

24 July 2021
19:05
v

Report

Japan	19–20 (OT)	Poland
Pts: Brown, Tominaga 7		Pts: Pawłowski, Zamojski 7

Aomi Urban Sports Park, Tokyo
Referees: Vlad Ghizdareanu (ROU), Jasmina Juras (SRB)

24 July 2021
22:00
v

Report

Netherlands	18–15	ROC
Pts: Van der Horst 9		Pts: Karpenkov 6

Aomi Urban Sports Park, Tokyo
Referees: Jasmina Juras (SRB), Markos Michaelides (SUI)

24 July 2021
22:25
v

Report

Belgium	16–18 (OT)	Japan
Pts: Bogaerts 5		Pts: Yasuoka 7

Aomi Urban Sports Park, Tokyo
Referees: Vlad Ghizdareanu (ROU), Su Yu-yen (TPE)

25 July 2021
11:35
v

Report

ROC	16–21	Belgium
Pts: Karpenkov 7		Pts: Celis, Vervoort 7

Aomi Urban Sports Park, Tokyo
Referees: Vlad Ghizdareanu (ROU), Cecília Tóth (HUN)

25 July 2021
12:00
v

Report

Poland	12–15	Serbia
Pts: Pawłowski 4		Pts: Vasić 5

Aomi Urban Sports Park, Tokyo
Referees: Evgeny Ostrovskiy (RUS), Markos Michaelides (SUI)

25 July 2021
15:00
v

Report

China	17–18	Latvia
Pts: Hu 12		Pts: Lasmanis 11

Aomi Urban Sports Park, Tokyo
Referees: Evgeny Ostrovskiy (RUS), Vlad Ghizdareanu (ROU)

25 July 2021
15:25
v

Report

Serbia	21–14	Belgium
Pts: Domović Bulut 13		Pts: Bogaerts 6

Aomi Urban Sports Park, Tokyo
Referees: Markos Michaelides (SUI), Cecília Tóth (HUN)

25 July 2021
18:40
v

Report

ROC	16–21	Poland
Pts: Pisklov 6		Pts: Pawłowski 8

Aomi Urban Sports Park, Tokyo
Referees: Edmond Ho (HKG), Jasmina Juras (SRB)

25 July 2021
19:05
v

Report

Japan	20–21	Netherlands
Pts: Tominaga 10		Pts: Bekkering, Slagter 6

Aomi Urban Sports Park, Tokyo
Referees: Marek Maliszewski (POL), Vanessa Devlin (AUS)

25 July 2021
22:00
v

Report

Netherlands	21–18	China
Pts: Van der Horst 8		Pts: Hu 17

Aomi Urban Sports Park, Tokyo
Referees: Glenn Tuitt (USA), Jasmina Juras (SRB)

25 July 2021
22:25
v

Report

Latvia	21–18	Japan
Pts: Lasmanis 7		Pts: Tominaga 9

Aomi Urban Sports Park, Tokyo
Referees: Edmond Ho (HKG), Marek Maliszewski (POL)

26 July 2021
11:35
v

Report

Belgium	20–21	China
Pts: Vervoort 10		Pts: Hu 9

Aomi Urban Sports Park, Tokyo
Referees: Marek Maliszewski (POL), Cecília Tóth (HUN)

26 July 2021
12:00
v

Report

Serbia	21–11	Japan
Pts: Domović Bulut 7		Pts: Yasuoka 8

Aomi Urban Sports Park, Tokyo
Referees: Edmond Ho (HKG), Glenn Tuitt (USA)

26 July 2021
15:00
v

Report

Japan	16–19	ROC
Pts: Brown 7		Pts: Pisklov 7

Aomi Urban Sports Park, Tokyo
Referees: Glenn Tuitt (USA), Cecília Tóth (HUN)

26 July 2021
15:25
v

Report

Latvia	16–22	Serbia
Pts: three players 5		Pts: Majstorović 11

Aomi Urban Sports Park, Tokyo
Referees: Edmond Ho (HKG), Marek Maliszewski (POL)

26 July 2021
18:40
v

Report

Netherlands	17–18 (OT)	Belgium
Pts: Voorn 10		Pts: Vervoort 7

Aomi Urban Sports Park, Tokyo
Referees: Markos Michaelides (SUI), Evgeny Ostrovskiy (RUS)

26 July 2021
19:05
v

Report

Poland	19–21	China
Pts: Pawłowski 7		Pts: Hu 12

Aomi Urban Sports Park, Tokyo
Referees: Vlad Ghizdareanu (ROU), Jasmina Juras (SRB)

26 July 2021
22:00
v

Report

ROC	19–15	Latvia
Pts: Zuev 7		Pts: Lasmanis 6

Aomi Urban Sports Park, Tokyo
Referees: Vlad Ghizdareanu (ROU), Jasmina Juras (SRB)

26 July 2021
22:25
v

Report

Netherlands	22–20 (OT)	Poland
Pts: Bekkering, Van der Horst 6		Pts: Hicks 8

Aomi Urban Sports Park, Tokyo
Referees: Markos Michaelides (SUI), Evgeny Ostrovskiy (RUS)

27 July 2021
14:40
v

Report

Belgium	16–14	Poland
Pts: Vervoort 11		Pts: Hicks 8

Aomi Urban Sports Park, Tokyo
Referees: Edmond Ho (HKG), Vlad Ghizdareanu (ROU)

27 July 2021
15:05
v

Report

China	16–21	Japan
Pts: Gao 8		Pts: Tominaga, Yasuoka 8

Aomi Urban Sports Park, Tokyo
Referees: Markos Michaelides (SUI), Jasmina Juras (SRB)

27 July 2021
18:00
v

Report

Serbia	21–10	ROC
Pts: Vasić 8		Pts: Karpenkov 5

Aomi Urban Sports Park, Tokyo
Referees: Markos Michaelides (SUI), Cecília Tóth (HUN)

27 July 2021
18:25
v

Report

Latvia	22–18	Netherlands
Pts: Miezis 9		Pts: Van der Horst 8

Aomi Urban Sports Park, Tokyo
Referees: Edmond Ho (HKG), Jasmina Juras (SRB)

== Knockout stage ==
=== Bracket ===
Quarterfinals
27 July
Netherlands	19
ROC	21
27 July
Latvia	21
Japan	18

Semifinals
28 July
Serbia	10
ROC	21
28 July
Belgium	8
Latvia	21

Gold medal
28 July
ROC	18
Latvia	21
Bronze medal
28 July
Serbia	21
Belgium	10

=== Quarterfinals ===
27 July 2021
21:00
v

Report

Netherlands	19–21	ROC
Pts: Van der Horst 8		Pts: Zuev 9

Aomi Urban Sports Park, Tokyo
Referees: Edmond Ho (HKG), Markos Michaelides (SUI)

27 July 2021
22:20
v

Report

Latvia	21–18	Japan
Pts: Krūmiņš 9		Pts: Tominaga 8

Aomi Urban Sports Park, Tokyo
Referees: Jasmina Juras (SRB), Marek Maliszewski (POL)

=== Semifinals ===
28 July 2021
17:30
v

Report

Serbia	10–21	ROC
Pts: Domović Bulut 5		Pts: Zuev 11

Aomi Urban Sports Park, Tokyo
Referees: Marek Maliszewski (POL), Markos Michaelides (SUI)

28 July 2021
18:40
v

Report

Belgium	8–21	Latvia
Pts: Vervoort 5		Pts: Lasmanis 9

Aomi Urban Sports Park, Tokyo
Referees: Edmond Ho (HKG), Markos Michaelides (SUI)

=== Bronze medal game ===
28 July 2021
21:15
v

Report

Serbia	21–10	Belgium
Pts: Domović Bulut 7		Pts: Vervoort 5

Aomi Urban Sports Park, Tokyo
Referees: Edmond Ho (HKG), Marek Maliszewski (POL)

=== Gold medal game ===
28 July 2021
22:25
v

Report

ROC	18–21	Latvia
Pts: Karpenkov 7		Pts: Lasmanis 10

Aomi Urban Sports Park, Tokyo
Referees: Jasmina Juras (SRB), Markos Michaelides (SUI)

== Final ranking ==
Rank	Team
Gold medal	Latvia
Silver medal	ROC
Bronze medal	Serbia
4	Belgium
5	Netherlands
6	Japan
7	Poland
8	China

== Points leaders ==
Rank	Name	Points
1	(Latvia) Kārlis Lasmanis	76
2	(China) Hu Jinqiu	65
3	(Belgium) Thibaut Vervoort	61
3	(Latvia) Nauris Miezis	61
5	(Serbia) Dušan Domović Bulut	60
