= Basketball at the 2020 Summer Olympics – Men's 3x3 qualification =

In the 2020 Summer Olympics (postponed to 2021 due to the COVID-19 pandemic), eight teams qualified for the Olympic 3x3 men's basketball tournament.

== Format ==
Three teams qualified based on the 2019 world ranking list. Japan, as the host nation, was guaranteed one spot.

Three teams qualified through the 2020 FIBA Olympic Qualifying Tournament (OQT). This was a 20-team tournament. NOCs already qualified through the ranking list were not eligible to play in the OQT. The 20 teams for the OQT consisted of the OQT hosts, the three highest-placed teams at the 2019 FIBA 3x3 World Cup, and 16 teams on the world ranking list (with Japan being guaranteed a spot if not already qualified for the Olympics). The first ten quota spots for the OQT are open to any team that has not qualified for the men's Olympic tournament, but the remaining ten spots are subject to two restrictions. First, an NOC that has a team qualified for the women's tournament was excluded from these restricted quota places. Second, no more than ten NOCs from any given continent may compete at the OQT.

The final quota place was determined through the 2020 FIBA Universality Olympic Qualifying Tournament (UOQT). This was a 6-team tournament. NOCs already qualified through the ranking list or the OQT were not eligible to play in the UOQT. Further, any NOC that has had a men's or women's team play in the basketball at the 2012 Summer Olympics or basketball at the 2016 Summer Olympics tournaments is ineligible for the UOQT. The six teams for the UOQT consisted of the UOQT hosts and 5 teams on the world ranking list (with Japan being guaranteed a spot if not already qualified for the Olympics; Japan was eligible for the UOQT despite having a women's team play basketball in the 2016 Summer Olympics).

== Table ==
| Means of qualification | Date(s) | Location | Berth(s) | Qualifier(s) |
|---|---|---|---|---|
| Host nation | — | — | 1 | Japan |
| FIBA 3x3 World Ranking | 1 November 2019 | (Japan) Utsunomiya | 3 | China; ROC; Serbia |
| 2021 FIBA 3x3 Olympic Qualifying Tournament | 26–30 May 2021 | (Austria) Graz | 3 | Poland; Netherlands; Latvia |
| 2021 FIBA Universality Olympic Qualifying Tournament | 4–6 June 2021 | (Hungary) Debrecen | 1 | Belgium |
| Total | | | 8 | |

== World ranking ==
The top four teams (three if Japan uses the host quota place in the men's tournament) on the FIBA 3x3 men's basketball ranking list on 1 November 2019 qualified for the Olympics. These rankings were also used to determine entrants to both the OQT and UOQT.

== OQT ==
Teams already qualified for the Olympics were excluded. The hosts of the OQT, the top three teams from the World Cup, and 16 teams from the rankings (including Japan, if not already qualified) competed for three Olympic qualifying places. It was initially scheduled to be held from 18 to 22 March 2020. but was postponed due to the COVID-19 pandemic. The tournament was initially scheduled to be held in Bangalore, India but the tournament was moved to Graz, Austria and was held from 26 to 30 May 2021. Games were at a temporary makeshift 2,000-seat capacity at the Hauptplatz.

New Zealand withdrew from the OQT in February 2021.

=== Qualified teams ===
| Means of qualification | Date | Venue | Berth(s) | Qualifier(s) |
|---|---|---|---|---|
| OQT hosts | — | — | 1 | Austria |
| 2019 FIBA 3x3 World Cup | 23 June 2019 | (Netherlands) Amsterdam | 3 | United States; Latvia; Poland |
| FIBA 3x3 World Ranking | 1 November 2019 | (Japan) Utsunomiya | 16 | Mongolia; Slovenia; Netherlands; France; Lithuania; Brazil; Belgium; Qatar; Canada; Croatia; Philippines; South Korea; Turkey; Czech Republic; Dominican Republic; Kazakhstan |
| Total | | | 20 | |

=== Final ranking ===
| # | Team | Pld | W | L | PF | PA | PD |
|---|---|---|---|---|---|---|---|
| 1st | Poland | 6 | 5 | 1 | 110 | 93 | +17 |
| 2nd | Netherlands | 6 | 4 | 2 | 113 | 98 | +15 |
| 3rd | Latvia | 7 | 6 | 1 | 144 | 119 | +25 |
| 4th | France | 7 | 5 | 2 | 125 | 109 | +16 |
Eliminated at the quarterfinals
| 5th | Lithuania | 5 | 3 | 2 | 99 | 79 | +20 |
| 6th | United States | 5 | 3 | 2 | 96 | 83 | +13 |
| 7th | Brazil | 5 | 3 | 2 | 91 | 64 | +27 |
| 8th | Slovenia | 5 | 2 | 3 | 89 | 83 | +6 |
Eliminated at the preliminary round
| 9th | Belgium | 4 | 3 | 1 | 77 | 60 | +17 |
| 10th | Mongolia | 4 | 2 | 2 | 69 | 70 | −1 |
| 11th | Canada | 4 | 2 | 2 | 67 | 69 | −2 |
| 12th | Austria | 4 | 2 | 2 | 66 | 71 | −5 |
| 13th | Dominican Republic | 4 | 2 | 2 | 62 | 66 | −4 |
| 14th | Qatar | 4 | 2 | 2 | 59 | 63 | −4 |
| 15th | Czech Republic | 4 | 1 | 3 | 67 | 74 | −7 |
| 16th | South Korea | 4 | 1 | 3 | 50 | 78 | −28 |
| 17th | Turkey | 4 | 1 | 3 | 49 | 80 | −31 |
| 18th | Croatia | 4 | 0 | 4 | 65 | 79 | −14 |
| 19th | Kazakhstan | 4 | 0 | 4 | 54 | 83 | −29 |
| 20th | Philippines | 4 | 0 | 4 | 48 | 79 | −31 |

| Qualified for the 2020 Summer Olympics |

== UOQT ==
Teams already qualified for the Olympics were excluded. NOCs which have had teams in either the men's or women's competitions at the 2012 or 2016 Olympics were also excluded, except for Japan. The hosts of the UOQT and five teams from the rankings (including Japan, if not already qualified) competed for one Olympic qualifying place.

=== Qualified teams ===
| Means of qualification | Date | Venue | Berth(s) | Qualifier(s) |
|---|---|---|---|---|
| UOQT hosts | — | — | 1 | Hungary |
| FIBA 3x3 World Ranking | 1 November 2019 | — | 5 | Mongolia; Slovenia; Belgium; Ukraine; Romania |
| Total | | | 6 | |

=== Preliminary round ===
==== Pool A ====
| Pos | Team | Pld | W | L | PF | PA | PD | Qualification | Belgium | Slovenia | Ukraine |
|---|---|---|---|---|---|---|---|---|---|---|---|
| 1 | Belgium | 2 | 2 | 0 | 39 | 32 | +7 | Semifinals | | | |
| 2 | Slovenia | 2 | 1 | 1 | 39 | 34 | +5 | Quarterfinals | 18–20 | | 21–14 |
| 3 | Ukraine | 2 | 0 | 2 | 28 | 40 | −12 | Quarterfinals | 14–19 | | |

Source: FIBA
Rules for classification: 1) Wins; 2) Head-to-head record; 3) Points scored; 4) Higher seed.

==== Pool B ====
| Pos | Team | Pld | W | L | PF | PA | PD | Qualification | Hungary | Mongolia | Romania |
|---|---|---|---|---|---|---|---|---|---|---|---|
| 1 | Hungary (H) | 2 | 2 | 0 | 42 | 24 | +18 | Semifinals | | | 21–16 |
| 2 | Mongolia | 2 | 1 | 1 | 30 | 30 | 0 | Quarterfinals | 8–21 | | 22–9 |
| 3 | Romania | 2 | 0 | 2 | 25 | 43 | −18 | Quarterfinals | | | |

Source: FIBA
Rules for classification: 1) Wins; 2) Head-to-head record; 3) Points scored; 4) Higher seed.
(H) Hosts

=== Knockout stage ===
Quarter-finals
6 June
Mongolia | 19
Ukraine | 17
6 June
Slovenia | 21
Romania | 12

Semi-finals
6 June
Belgium | 16
Mongolia | 15
6 June
Hungary | 19
Slovenia | 16

Final
6 June
Belgium | 21
Hungary | 14

== See also ==
- Basketball at the 2020 Summer Olympics – Women's 3x3 qualification
