= 2021 FIBA 3x3 Olympic Qualifying Tournament =

3x3 basketball competition

The 2021 FIBA Olympic Qualifying Tournament was initially scheduled to be held in Bangalore, India from 18 to 22 March 2020. However, due to the COVID-19 pandemic, the tournament was moved to Graz, Austria and was held from 26 to 30 May 2021. The games accommodated a temporary makeshift 2,000-seat capacity at the Hauptplatz.

== Qualified teams ==
Teams already qualified for the Olympics were excluded. The hosts of the OQT, the top three teams from the World Cup, and 16 teams from the rankings (including Japan, if not already qualified) competed for three Olympic qualifying places.

Means of qualification	Date	Venue	Berth(s)	Qualifier(s)
OQT hosts	—	—	1	Austria
2019 FIBA 3x3 World Cup	23 June 2019	(Netherlands) Amsterdam	3	United States; Latvia; Poland
FIBA 3x3 World Ranking	1 November 2019	(Japan) Utsunomiya	16	Mongolia; Slovenia; Netherlands; France; Lithuania; Brazil; Belgium; Qatar; Canada; Croatia; Philippines; South Korea; Turkey; Czech Republic; Dominican Republic; Kazakhstan
Total			20	

== Players ==
Seed	Team	Players			
1	Mongolia	Davaasambuugiin Delgernyam	Enkhbatyn Dölgöön	Enkhtaivany Tserenbaatar	Gotovyn Tsengüünbayar
2	United States	Robbie Hummel	Dominique Jones	Joey King	Kareem Maddox
3	Netherlands	Julian Jaring	Arvin Slagter	Dimeo van der Horst	Jessey Voorn
4	Slovenia	Simon Finžgar	Adin Kavgič	Gašper Ovnik	Anže Srebovt
5	Latvia	Agnis Čavars	Edgars Krūmiņš	Kārlis Lasmanis	Nauris Miezis
6	France	Antoine Eito	Dominique Gentil	Charly Pontens	Raphaël Wilson
7	Lithuania	Modestas Kumpys	Aurelijus Pukelis	Darius Tarvydas	Šarūnas Vingelis
8	Poland	Michael Hicks	Paweł Pawłowski	Szymon Rduch	Przemysław Zamojski
9	Brazil	André Ferros	Jonatas Mello	Jefferson Socas	Fabricio Verissimo
10	Belgium	Rafael Bogaerts	Nick Celis	Thierry Marien	Thibaut Vervoort
11	Qatar	Nedim Muslic	Seydou Ndoye	Abdulrahman Saad	Erfan Ali Saeed
12	Croatia	Stanko Kujundžić	Toni Mindoljević	Luka Petrašić	Ivan Rašetina
13	Canada	Jordan Jensen-Whyte	Alex Johnson	Kyle Landry	Steve Sir
14	Philippines	Joshua Munzon	CJ Perez	Leonard Santillan	Moala Tautuaa
15	South Korea	Kim Min-seob	Lee Dong-jun	Lee Seung-jun	Park Min-su
16	Turkey	Dekan Bayraktar	Berk Nehir Çağliyan	Görkem Dilșen	Doğa İlke Ergazi
17	Czech Republic	Ondřej Šiška	Vladimír Sismilich	Daniel Zach	Roman Zachrla
18	Dominican Republic	Bryant Piantini	César Reyes	Carlos Rivera	Henry Valdez
19	Kazakhstan	Ruslan Aitkali	Nikolay Bazhin	Vladimir Kurochkin	Andrey Litvinenko
20	Austria	Filip Krämer	Moritz Lanegger	Matthias Linortner	Fabricio Vay

== Preliminary round ==
=== Pool A ===
Pos	Team	Pld	W	L	PF	PA	PD	Qualification	Poland	Brazil	Mongolia	Turkey	Czech Republic
1	Poland	4	3 (Note: Poland 13–12 Brazil)	1	69	59	+10	Knockout stage		13–12			17–15
2	Brazil	4	3	1	72	43	+29	Knockout stage			18–10	21–6	
3	Mongolia	4	2	2	69	70	−1		22–18			21–13	
4	Turkey	4	1 (Note: Turkey 20–17 Czech Republic)	3	49	80	−31		10–21				20–17
5	Czech Republic	4	1	3	67	74	−7			14–21	21–16		

Source: FIBA
Rules for classification: 1) Wins; 2) Head-to-head record; 3) Points scored; 4) Higher seed.

=== Pool B ===
Pos	Team	Pld	W	L	PF	PA	PD	Qualification	United States	Lithuania	Belgium	South Korea	Kazakhstan
1	United States	4	3 (Note: United States 1–1, 80 PS, 2 Seed; Lithuania 1–1, 80 PS, 7 Seed; Belgium 1–1, 77 PS)	1	80	62	+18	Knockout stage		21–20		21–3	
2	Lithuania	4	3	1	80	58	+22	Knockout stage			17–16		21–9
3	Belgium	4	3	1	77	60	+17		20–16			22–14	
4	South Korea	4	1	3	50	78	−28			12–22			21–13
5	Kazakhstan	4	0	4	54	83	−29		19–22		13–19		

Source: FIBA
Rules for classification: 1) Wins; 2) Head-to-head record; 3) Points scored; 4) Higher seed.

=== Pool C ===
Pos	Team	Pld	W	L	PF	PA	PD	Qualification	France	Slovenia	Dominican Republic	Qatar	Philippines
1	France	4	4	0	76	48	+28	Knockout stage			21–7	21–10	
2	Slovenia	4	2 (Note: Slovenia 1–1, 73 PS; Dominican Republic 1–1, 62 PS; Qatar 1–1, 59 PS)	2	73	62	+11	Knockout stage	17–19				21–11
3	Dominican Republic	4	2	2	62	66	−4			21–17		12–17	
4	Qatar	4	2	2	59	63	−4			11–18			21–12
5	Philippines	4	0	4	48	79	−31		14–15		11–22		

Source: FIBA
Rules for classification: 1) Wins; 2) Head-to-head record; 3) Points scored; 4) Higher seed.

=== Pool D ===
Pos	Team	Pld	W	L	PF	PA	PD	Qualification	Latvia	Netherlands	Canada	Austria	Croatia
1	Latvia	4	4	0	84	65	+19	Knockout stage			21–16	21–14	
2	Netherlands	4	2 (Note: Netherlands 1–1, 71 PS; Canada 1–1, 67 PS; Austria 1–1, 66 PS)	2	71	69	+2	Knockout stage	17–21				22–16
3	Canada	4	2	2	67	69	−2			17–15			18–14
4	Austria (H)	4	2	2	66	71	−5			15–17	19–16		
5	Croatia	4	0	4	65	79	−14		18–21			17–18	

Source: FIBA
Rules for classification: 1) Wins; 2) Head-to-head record; 3) Points scored; 4) Higher seed.
(H) Hosts

== Knockout stage ==
No final was played. The winners of the semifinals and the third place game winner qualified for the Olympics.

Quarter-finals
30 May
Poland	21
Slovenia	16
30 May
Latvia	21
Lithuania	19
30 May
United States	16
Netherlands	21
30 May
France	21
Brazil	19

Semi-finals
30 May
Poland	20
Latvia	18
30 May
Netherlands	21
France	13

Third place game
30 May
Latvia	21
France	15

== Final standings ==
#	Team	Pld	W	L	PF	PA	PD
1st	Poland	6	5	1	110	93	+17
2nd	Netherlands	6	4	2	113	98	+15
3rd	Latvia	7	6	1	144	119	+25
4th	France	7	5	2	125	109	+16
Eliminated at the quarterfinals
5th	Lithuania	5	3	2	99	79	+20
6th	United States	5	3	2	96	83	+13
7th	Brazil	5	3	2	91	64	+27
8th	Slovenia	5	2	3	89	83	+6
Eliminated at the preliminary round
9th	Belgium	4	3	1	77	60	+17
10th	Mongolia	4	2	2	69	70	−1
11th	Canada	4	2	2	67	69	−2
12th	Austria	4	2	2	66	71	−5
13th	Dominican Republic	4	2	2	62	66	−4
14th	Qatar	4	2	2	59	63	−4
15th	Czech Republic	4	1	3	67	74	−7
16th	South Korea	4	1	3	50	78	−28
17th	Turkey	4	1	3	49	80	−31
18th	Croatia	4	0	4	65	79	−14
19th	Kazakhstan	4	0	4	54	83	−29
20th	Philippines	4	0	4	48	79	−31

Qualified for the 2020 Summer Olympics

== See also ==
- 2021 FIBA 3x3 Women's Olympic Qualifying Tournament
