= Edogawa University =

Private university in Japan

Coordinates: 35°52′28.48″N 139°56′13.62″E

- 江戸川大学; Edogawa daigaku
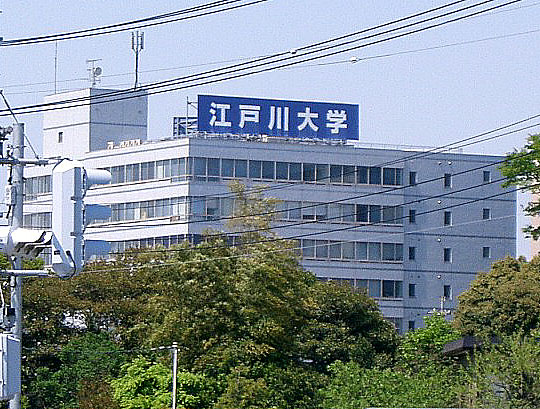
- Type: Private
- Established: 1990
- Location: Nagareyama, Chiba, Japan
- Website: Official website

Edogawa University (江戸川大学, Edogawa daigaku) is a private university in Nagareyama, Chiba, Japan, established in 1990. The school has two divisions, a College of Sociology and a College of Media and Mass Communication.

== Academics ==
=== College of Sociology ===
- Department of Psychology and Humanities
- Department of Contemporary Sociology
- Department of Business Management

=== College of Media and Communication ===
- Department of Mass Communication
- Department of Communication and Business
- Department of Childhood and Communication Studies

== Notable alumni ==
- Kimiko Koyama
- Karin Maruyama
- Ryuto Yasuoka
