= Thierry Mariën =

Belgian basketball player

Thierry Marien
No. 12 – Basketbal Willebroek
- Position: Forward
- League: Belgium 2

Personal information
- Born: 2 October 1992 (age 32); Antwerp, Belgium
- Listed height: 1.98 m (6 ft 6 in)
- Listed weight: 95 kg (209 lb)

Career information
- NBA draft: 2014: undrafted

Thierry Marien (born 2 October 1992) is a Belgian basketball player for Horticult Kontich Wolves and the Belgian 3x3 national team.

He represented Belgium at the 2020 Summer Olympics.
