= Karin Maruyama =

Japanese singer (1993–2015)

Karin Maruyama 丸山 夏鈴
- Born: 2 August 1993; Kōriyama, Fukushima Prefecture, Japan
- Died: 22 May 2015 (aged 21); Kōriyama, Fukushima Prefecture, Japan
- Genres: J-pop
- Occupations: Singer; tarento
- Instrument: Vocals
- Years active: 2012–15
- Labels: Yotsuba Records
- Website: Official website

Karin Maruyama (丸山 夏鈴, Maruyama Karin, 2 August 1993 – 22 May 2015) was a Japanese singer and tarento. She was born in Kōriyama, Fukushima Prefecture. She graduated from Shōshi Kōtō High School. She was nicknamed Rin-chan (りんちゃん). She was represented with Happy Strike. She had a brain tumor removed during her second year of elementary school. After that, by the time she made her debut, she had one operation in the second year of junior high school and two operations in the third year of high school. During her hospitalization for surgery, she was influenced by the appearance of idols she saw on television and wanted to be like them too, so she decided to begin a fight against cancer to achieve her dreams. After she died, she was buried in Nichirinji Temple, Motomiya. Her sister is Miss iD 2016 finalist and Go Yoshida Award winner Yuka Maruyama.

== Filmography ==
=== Magazines ===
Year	Title	Issue/Volume	Notes	Ref.
2013	Beautiful Lady & Television Go Yoshida Rensai	Oct 2013, Mar 2015	"Burari Go"	
2013	Trash-Up!!	16, 21	Cover, gravure on Vol. 21	
2015	Seikei Tōhoku	Jan 2015		

=== Television ===
Year	Title	Network	Notes	Ref.
2014	Goji tere Chu!	FCT		
2015	news every.	NTV		
2015	Ni-jō Han Record	FCT		
2015	Karin no Yume e no Kaidan	FCT		
2015	Minna no News	Fuji TV		
2015	Tokudane!	Fuji TV	Her memorial feature was broadcast	
2015	Hakunetsu Live: Bibbit	TBS	Her memorial feature was broadcast	
2015	Saigo made Idol: Karin to iu Kiseki	FCT	Her memorial feature was broadcast	
2016	NNN Document '16: Karin Maruyama –Saigo made Idol–	NTV	Reedited and shortened version of her memorial	

=== Radio ===
Year	Title	Network
2015	Karin Maruyama no Radicantroops 2.0	Radio Nippon

=== Internet ===
Year	Title
2012	Niconico Jinja in Odaiba Gasshūkoku 2012

== Discography ==
=== Singles ===
#	Year	Title	Standard Product Number	Highest rank	Ref.
1	2015	"Eternal Summer"	BCSHS-5	Single: 66; Indie single: 7 (6 July 2015)	
