= List of Olympic venues in basketball =

For the Summer Olympics, there are 29 venues that have been or will be used for basketball. The first official venue was outdoors under the auspices of the International Basketball Federation although the game was played indoors. Being played on tennis courts of clay, the final was held in a heavy rain which turned the courts into mud. Since those games, the basketball games have been played indoors.

Games	Venue	Other sports hosted at venues for those games	Capacity	Ref.
1936 Berlin	Tennis Courts	Fencing (épée)	832.	
1936 Berlin	Tennis Stadium (final)	None	Not listed.	
1948 London	Harringay Arena	Wrestling	Not listed.	
1952 Helsinki	Messuhalli (final)	Boxing, gymnastics, weightlifting, wrestling	5,500	
1952 Helsinki	Tennis Palace	None	1,250	
1956 Melbourne	West Melbourne Stadium	Boxing, gymnastics	7,000	
1956 Melbourne	Royal Exhibition Building (final)	Modern pentathlon (fencing), weightlifting, wrestling	3,500	
1960 Rome	Palazzo dello Sport (final)	Boxing	15,000	
1960 Rome	Palazzetto dello sport	Weightlifting	Not listed.	
1964 Tokyo	National Gymnasium	Diving, modern pentathlon (swimming), swimming	4,000 (basketball); 11,300 (diving, swimming)	
1968 Mexico City	Juan Escutia Sports Palace	Volleyball	22,370	
1972 Munich	Basketballhalle	Judo	6,635	
1976 Montreal	Centre Étienne Desmarteau	None	2,200	
1976 Montreal	Montreal Forum (finals)	Boxing (final), gymnastics, handball (final), volleyball (final)	18,000	
1980 Moscow	CSKA Palace of Sports	None	5,500	
1980 Moscow	Indoor Stadium (finals)	Boxing	16,500	
1984 Los Angeles	The Forum	None	17,505	
1988 Seoul	Jamsil Gymnasium	Volleyball (final)	12,751	
1992 Barcelona	Pavelló Olímpic de Badalona	None	12,500	
1996 Atlanta	Georgia Dome (finals)	Gymnastics (artistic), handball (men's final)	34,500 (each side)	
1996 Atlanta	Morehouse College Gymnasium	None	6,500	
2000 Sydney	Sydney SuperDome (finals)	Gymnastics (artistic, trampolining)	21,000	
2000 Sydney	The Dome and Exhibition Complex	Badminton, gymnastics (rhythmic), modern pentathlon (fencing, shooting), volleyball (indoor)	10,000	
2004 Athens	Helliniko Indoor Arena	Handball (final)	15,000	
2004 Athens	Olympic Indoor Hall (finals)	Gymnastics (artistic, trampolining)	19,250	
2008 Beijing	Wukesong Arena	None	18,000	
2012 London	Basketball Arena	Handball (medal round)	12,000	
2012 London	The O2 Arena (final)	Gymnastics (artistic, trampolining)	20,000	
2016 Rio de Janeiro	Carioca Arena 1	None	16,000	
2016 Rio de Janeiro	Youth Arena (women's group stage)	Modern pentathlon (fencing)	5,000	
2020 Tokyo	Saitama Super Arena	None	21,000	
2020 Tokyo	Aomi Urban Sports Park (3x3)	Sport climbing	7,100	
2024 Paris	Accor Arena (finals)	Gymnastics (artistic, trampolining)	15,000	
2024 Paris	Stade Pierre-Mauroy	Handball (finals)	26,000	
2024 Paris	Place de la Concorde (3x3)	Breaking, cycling (BMX freestyle), skateboarding	Not listed.	
2028 Los Angeles	Intuit Dome	None	18,000	
2028 Los Angeles	Sepulveda Basin Recreation Area (3x3)	Cycling (BMX racing/freestyle), modern pentathlon, skateboarding	Not listed.	
2032 Brisbane	Brisbane Entertainment Centre (finals)	None	11,000	
2032 Brisbane	Gold Coast Arena	None	10,000	
2032 Brisbane	Cairns Convention Centre	None	5,300	
2032 Brisbane	South Bank Piazza (3x3)	None	4,500	

== Gallery of venues ==
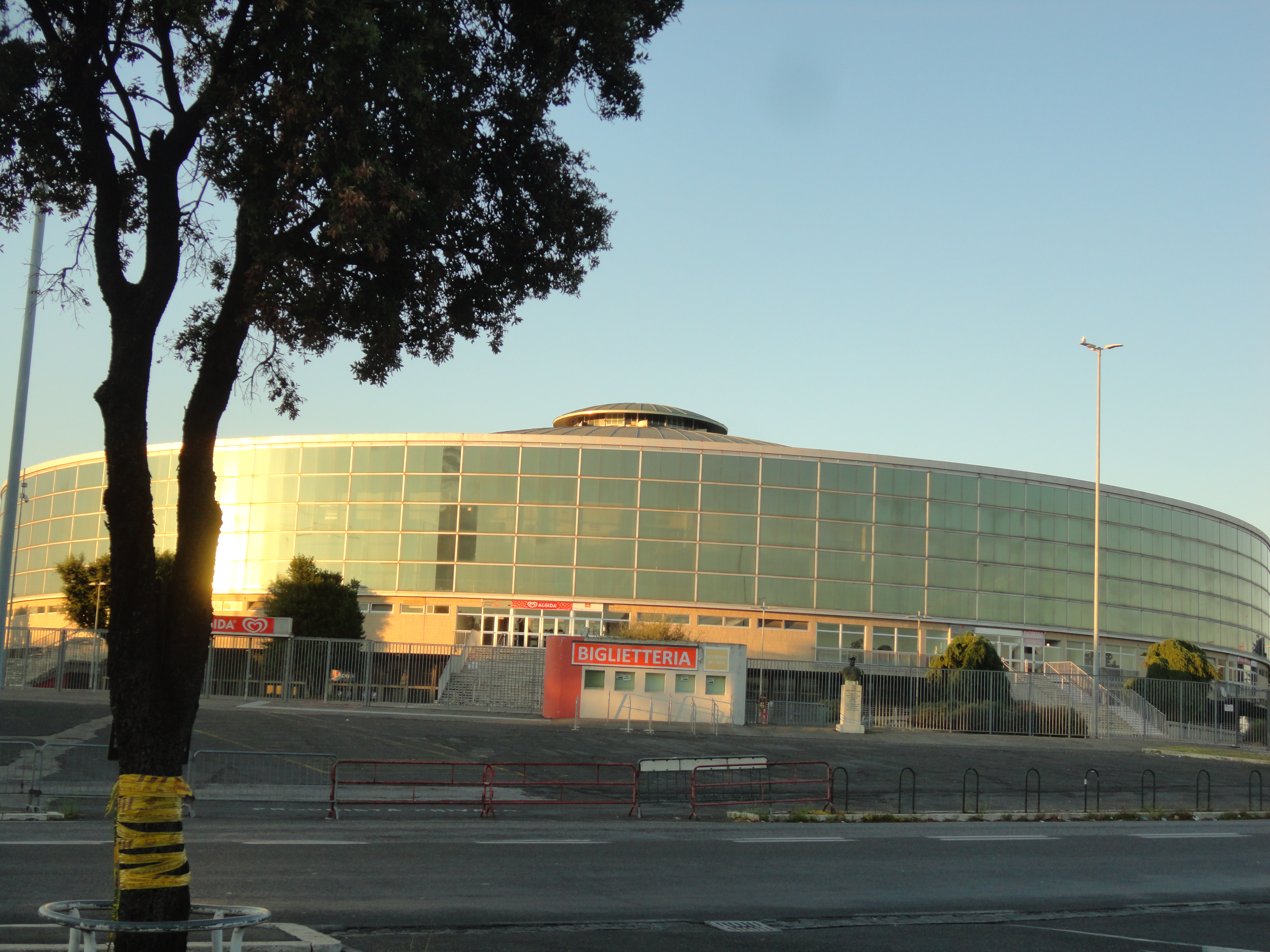
PalaLottomatica hosted basketball at the 1960 Summer Olympics in Rome.

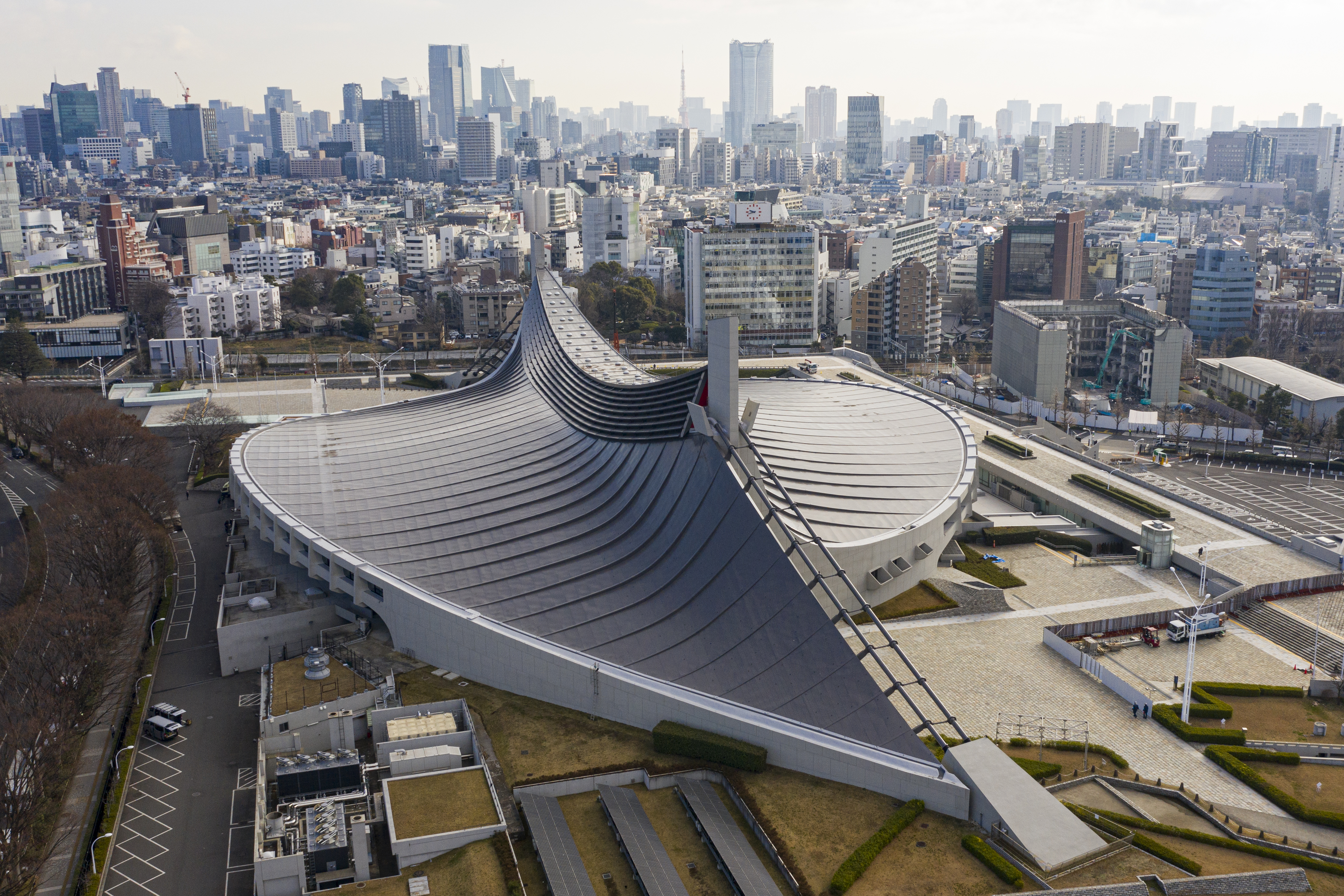
Yoyogi National Stadium hosted basketball at the 1964 Summer Olympics in Tokyo.

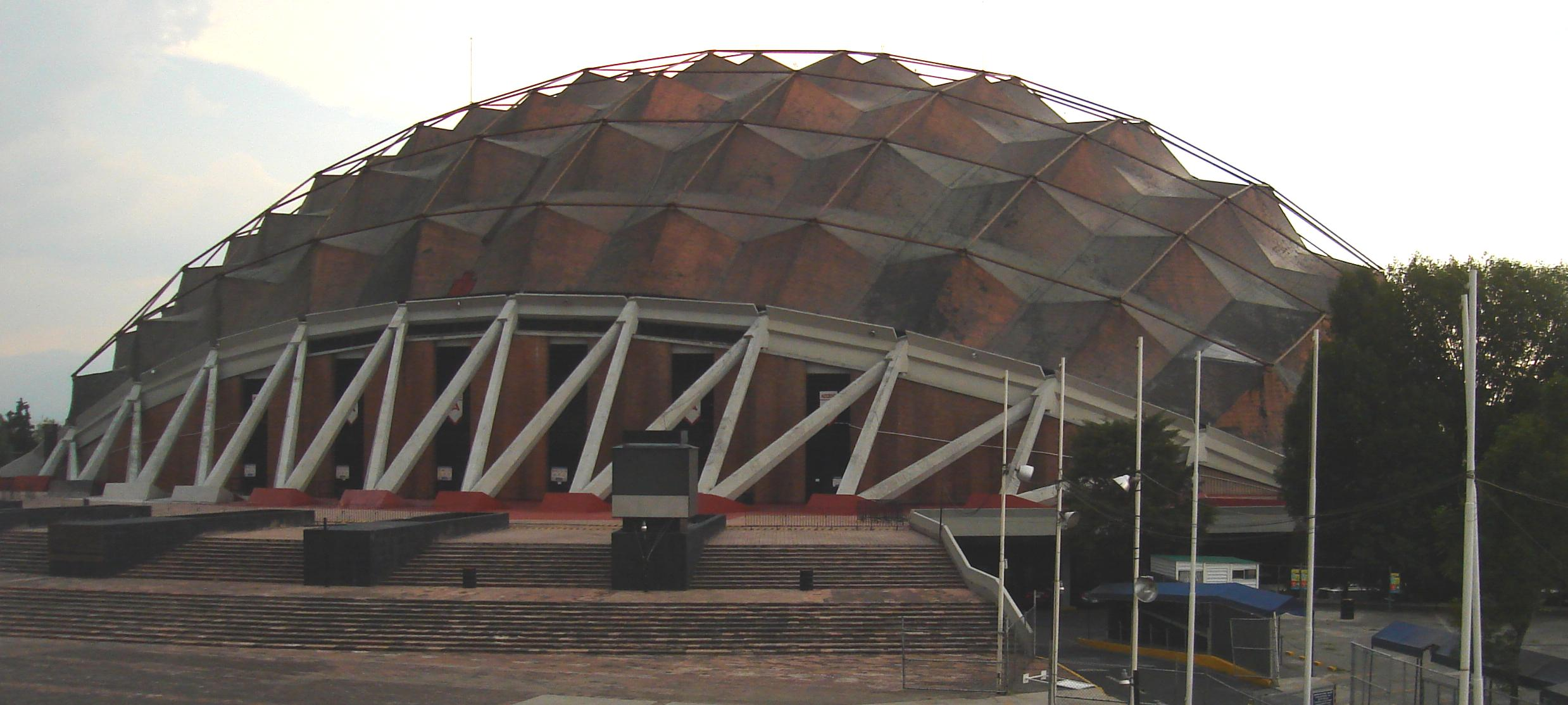
The Palacio de los Deportes hosted basketball at the 1968 Summer Olympics in Mexico City.

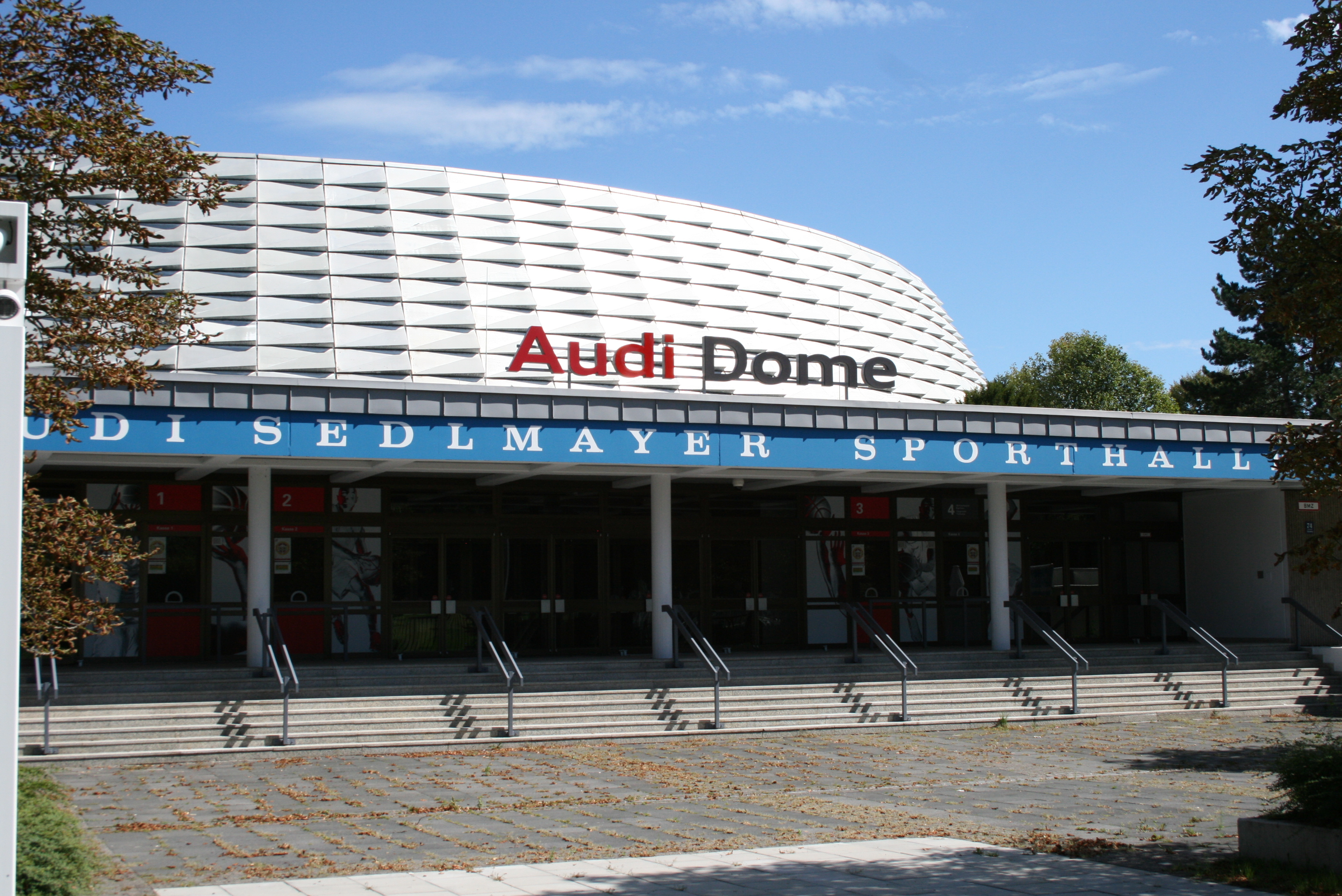
BMW Park hosted basketball at the 1972 Summer Olympics in Munich.

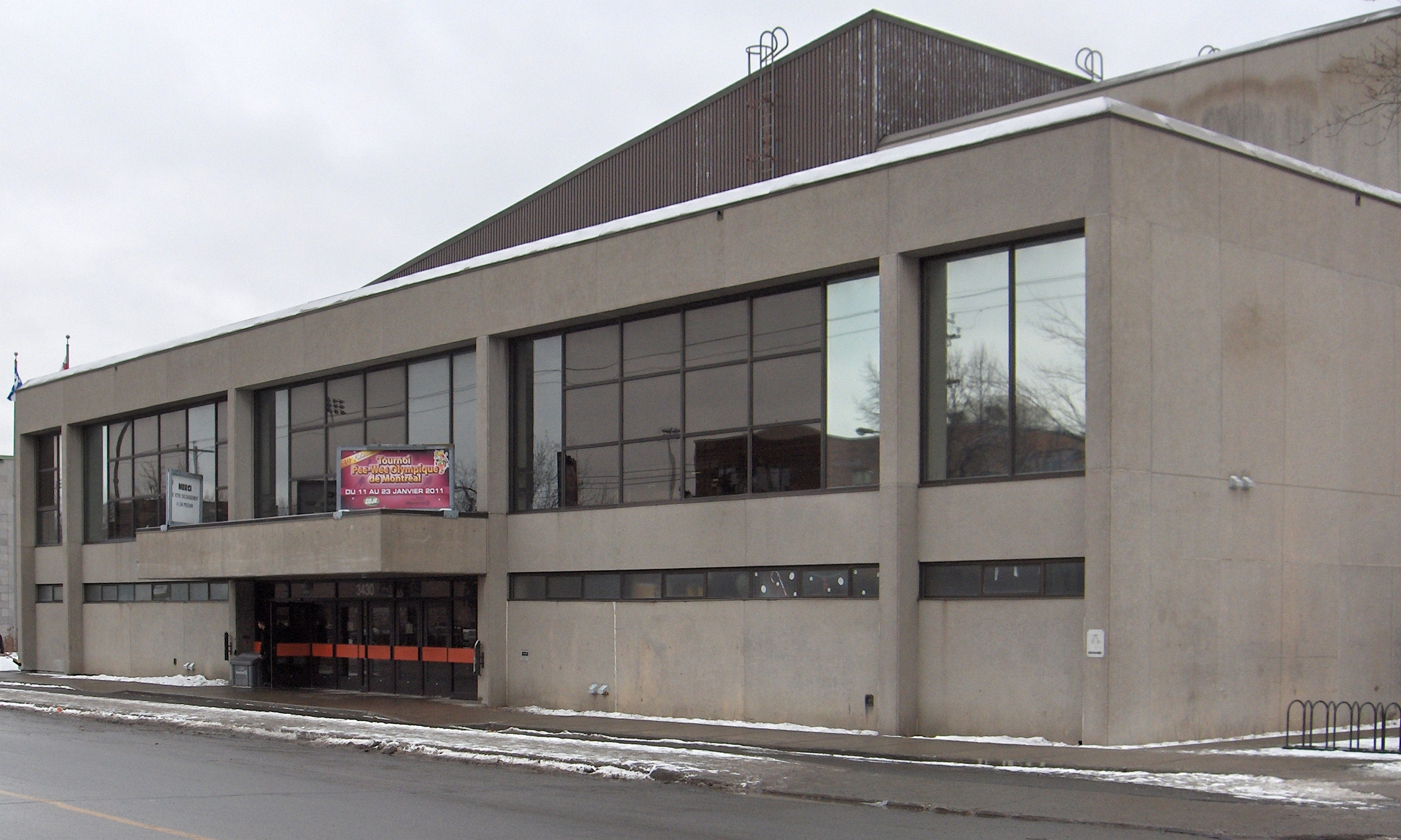
The Centre Étienne Desmarteau hosted basketball at the 1976 Summer Olympics in Montreal.

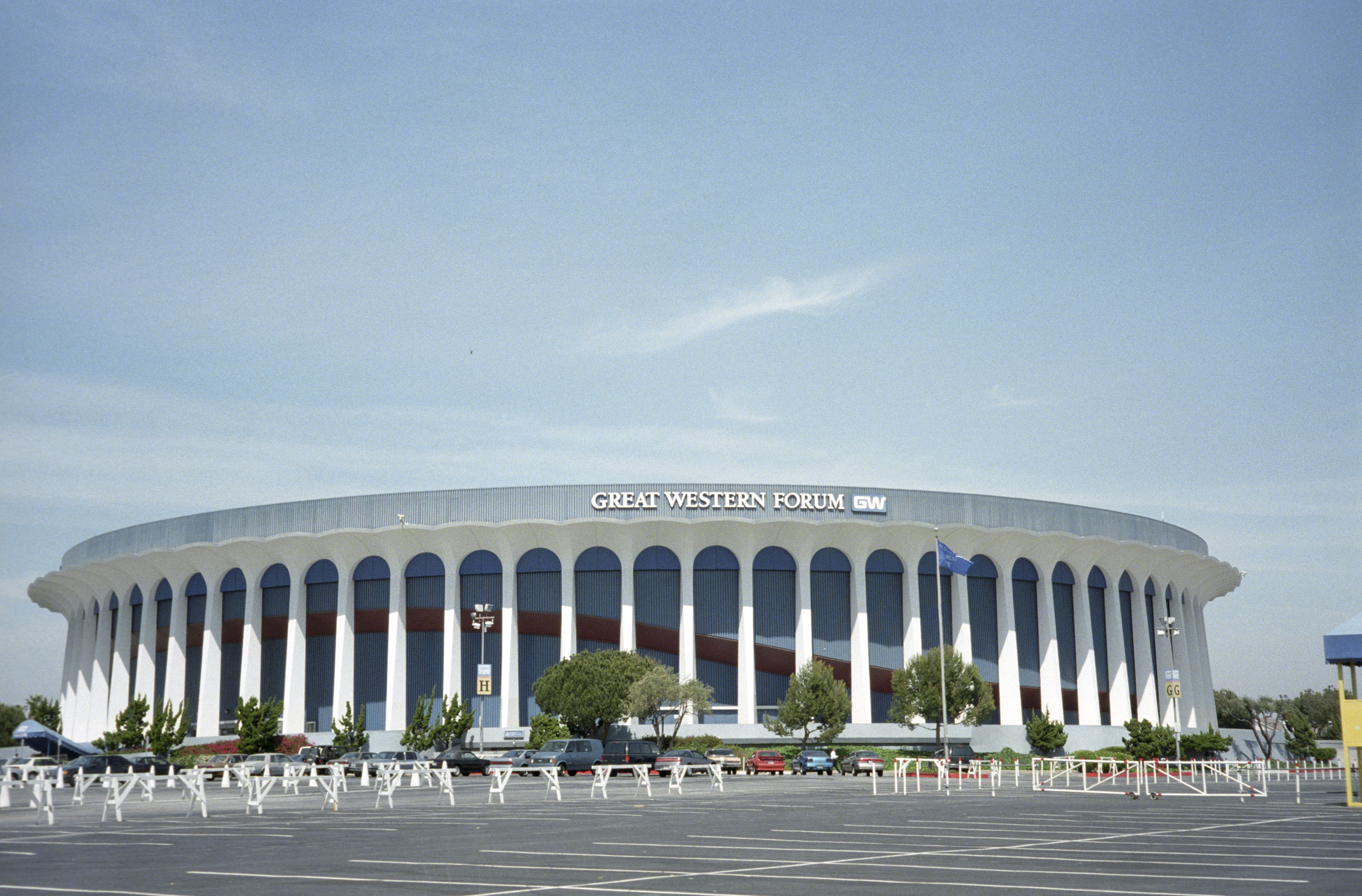
The Forum hosted the basketball at the 1984 Summer Olympics in Los Angeles.

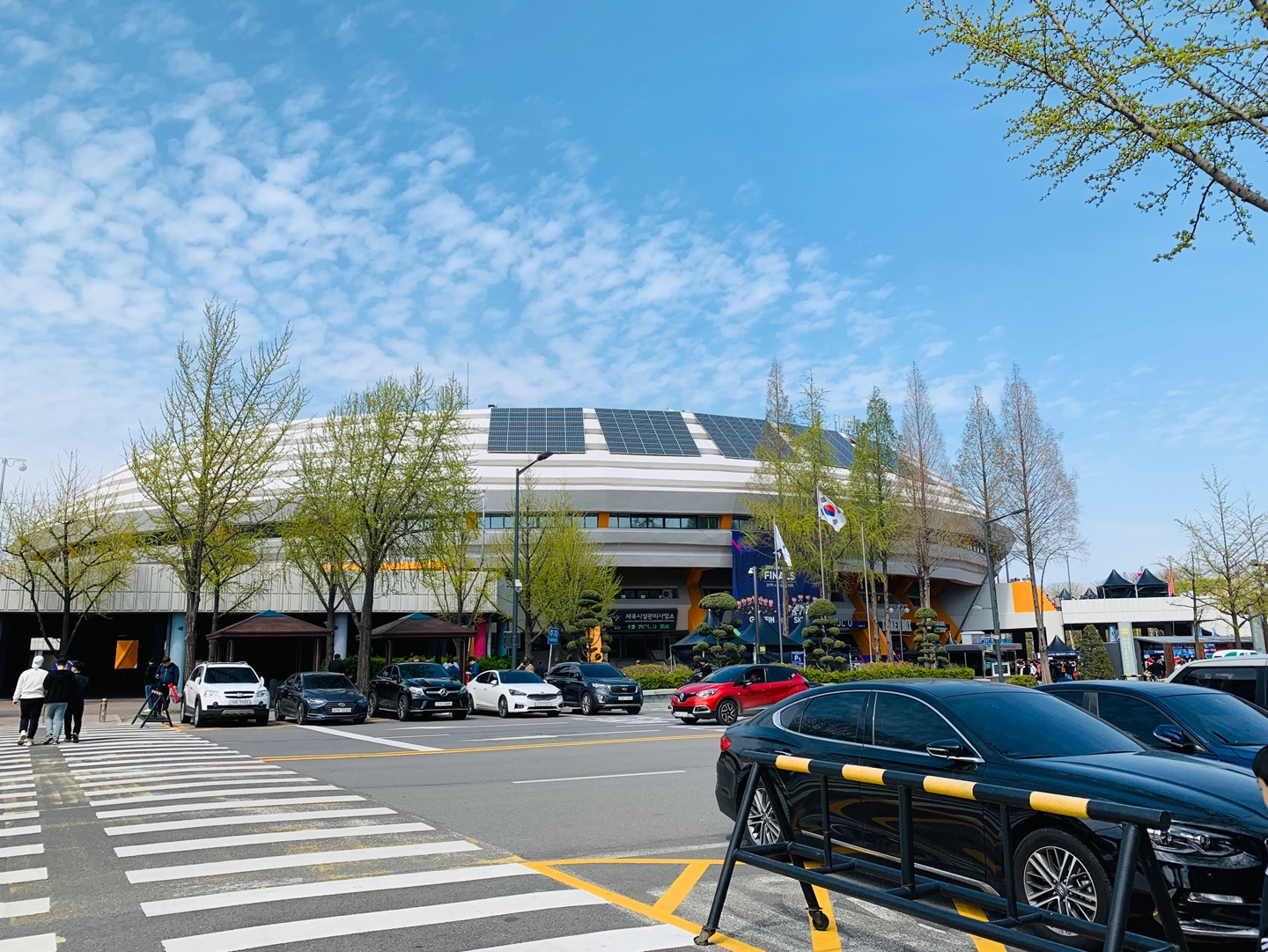
The Jamsil Arena hosted basketball at the 1988 Summer Olympics in Seoul.

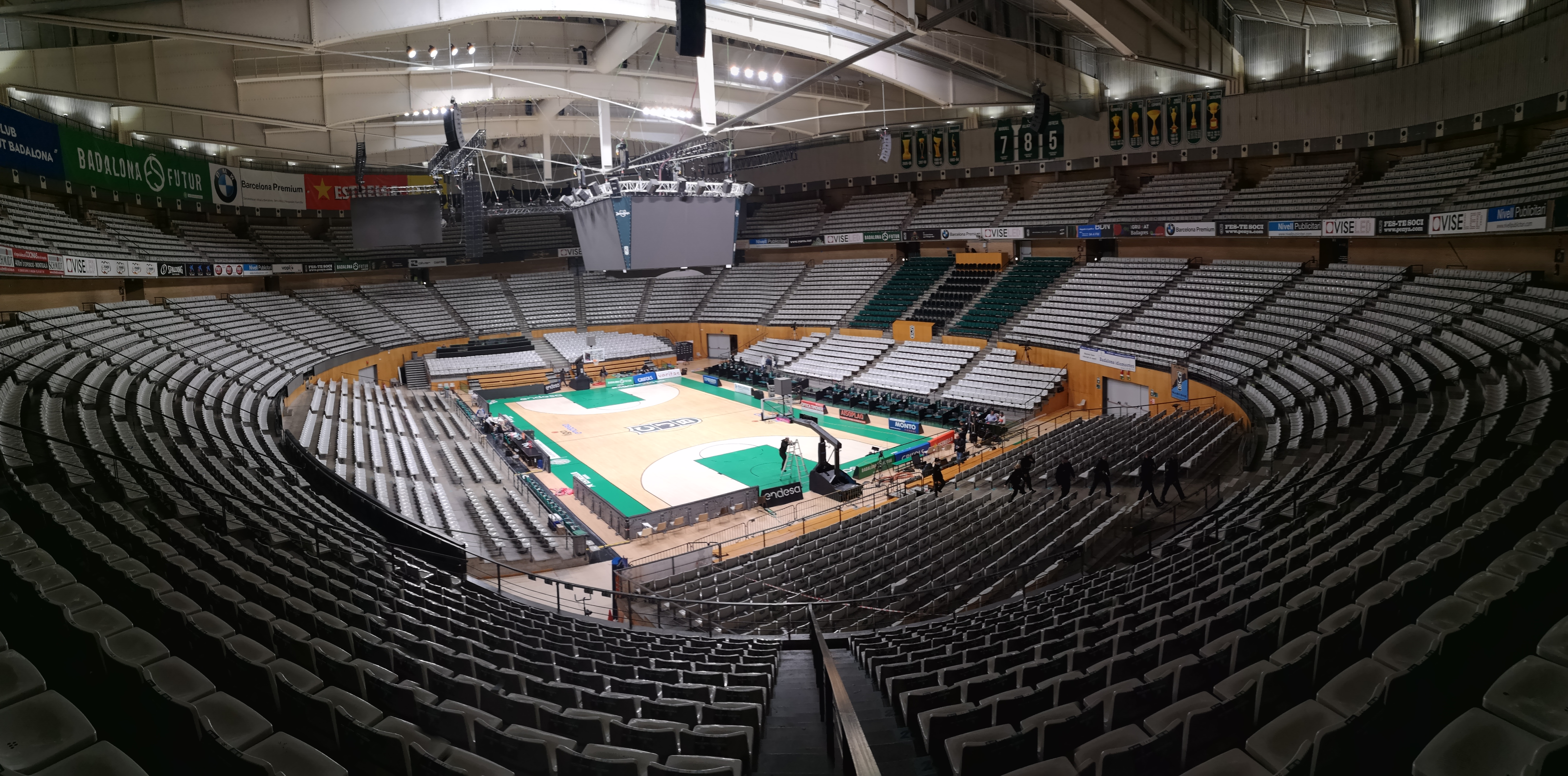
The Palau Municipal d'Esports de Badalona hosted basketball at the 1992 Summer Olympics in Barcelona.

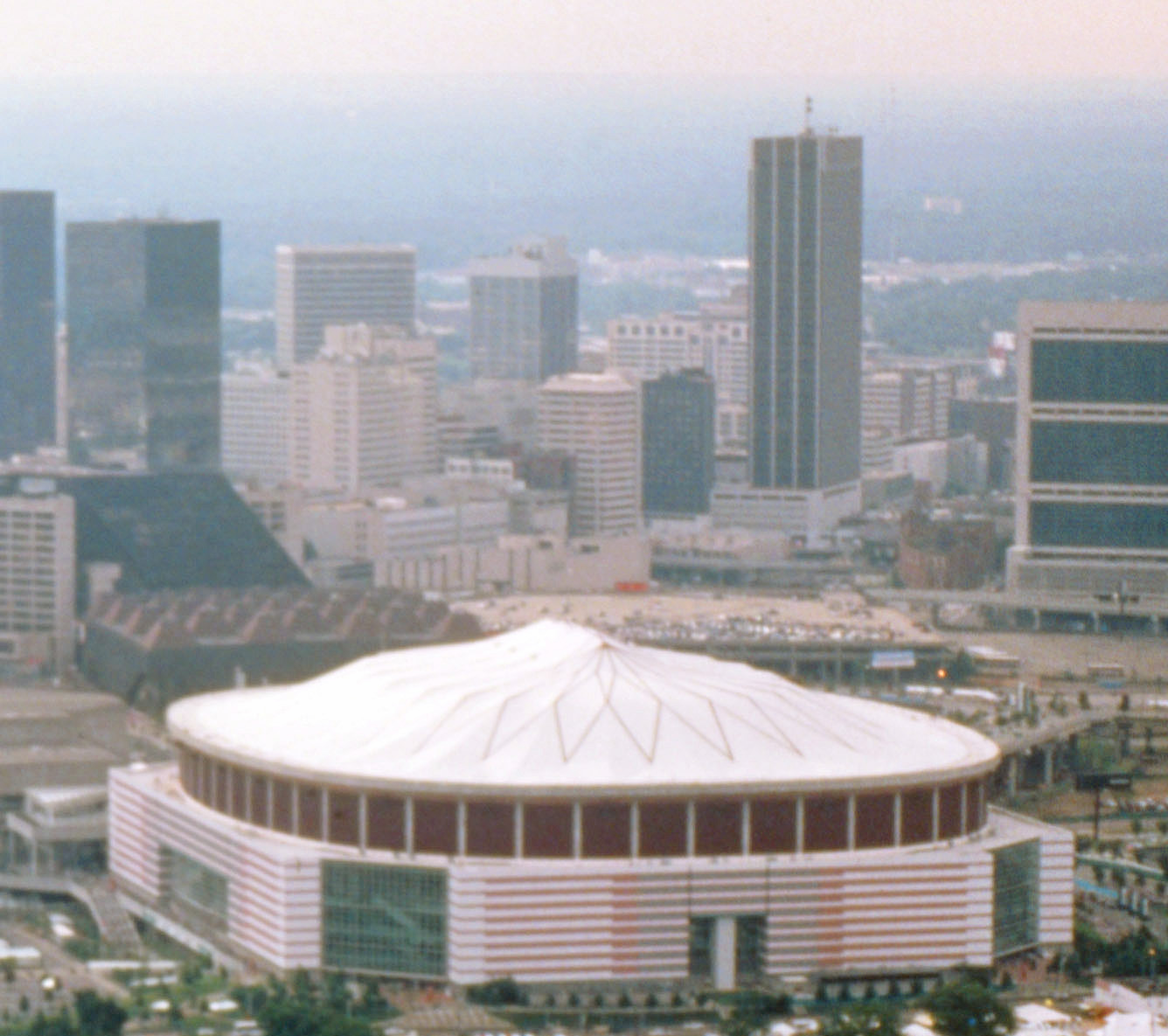
The Georgia Dome hosted basketball finals at the 1996 Summer Olympics in Atlanta.

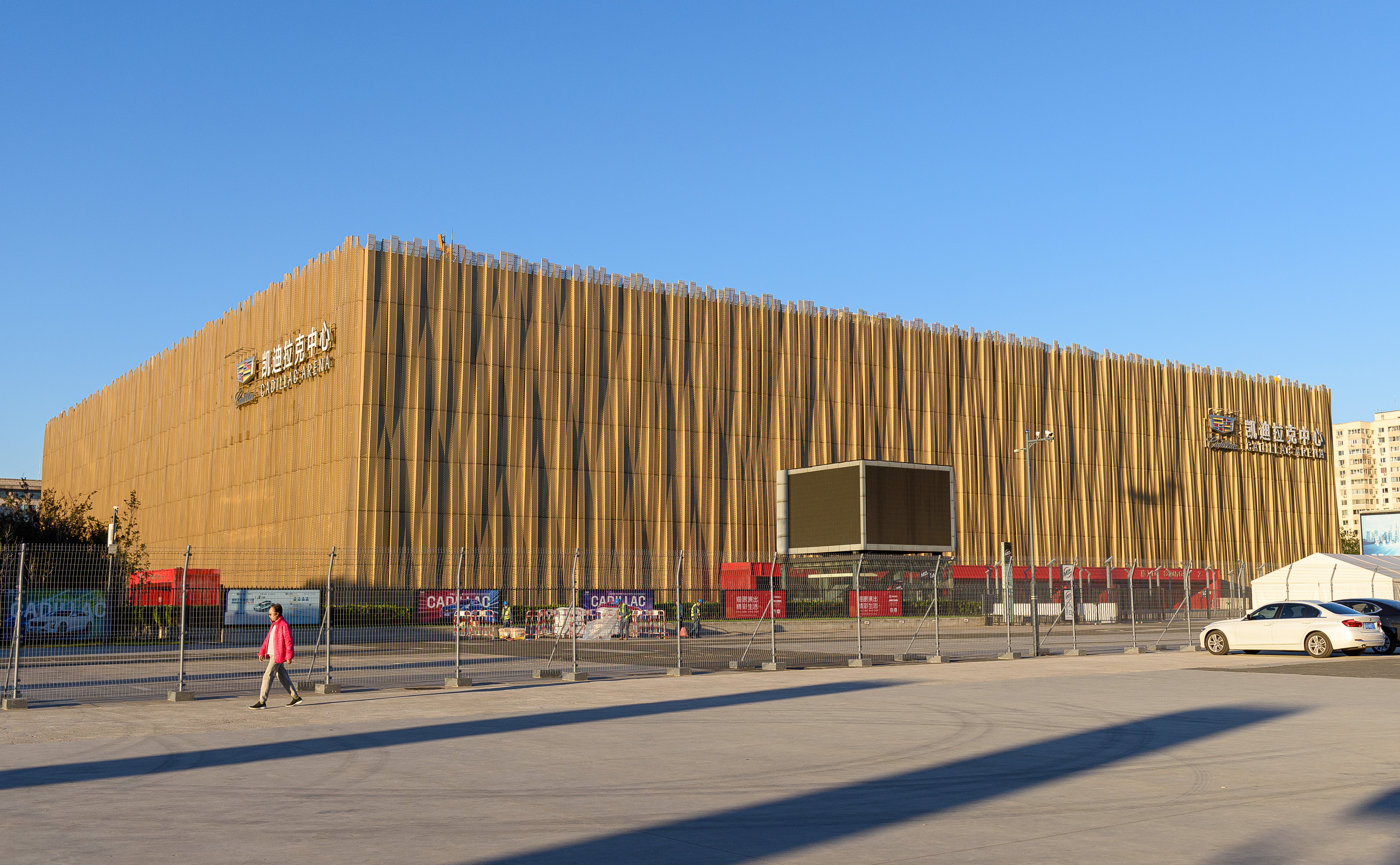
The Wukesong Arena hosted basketball at the 2008 Summer Olympics in Beijing.

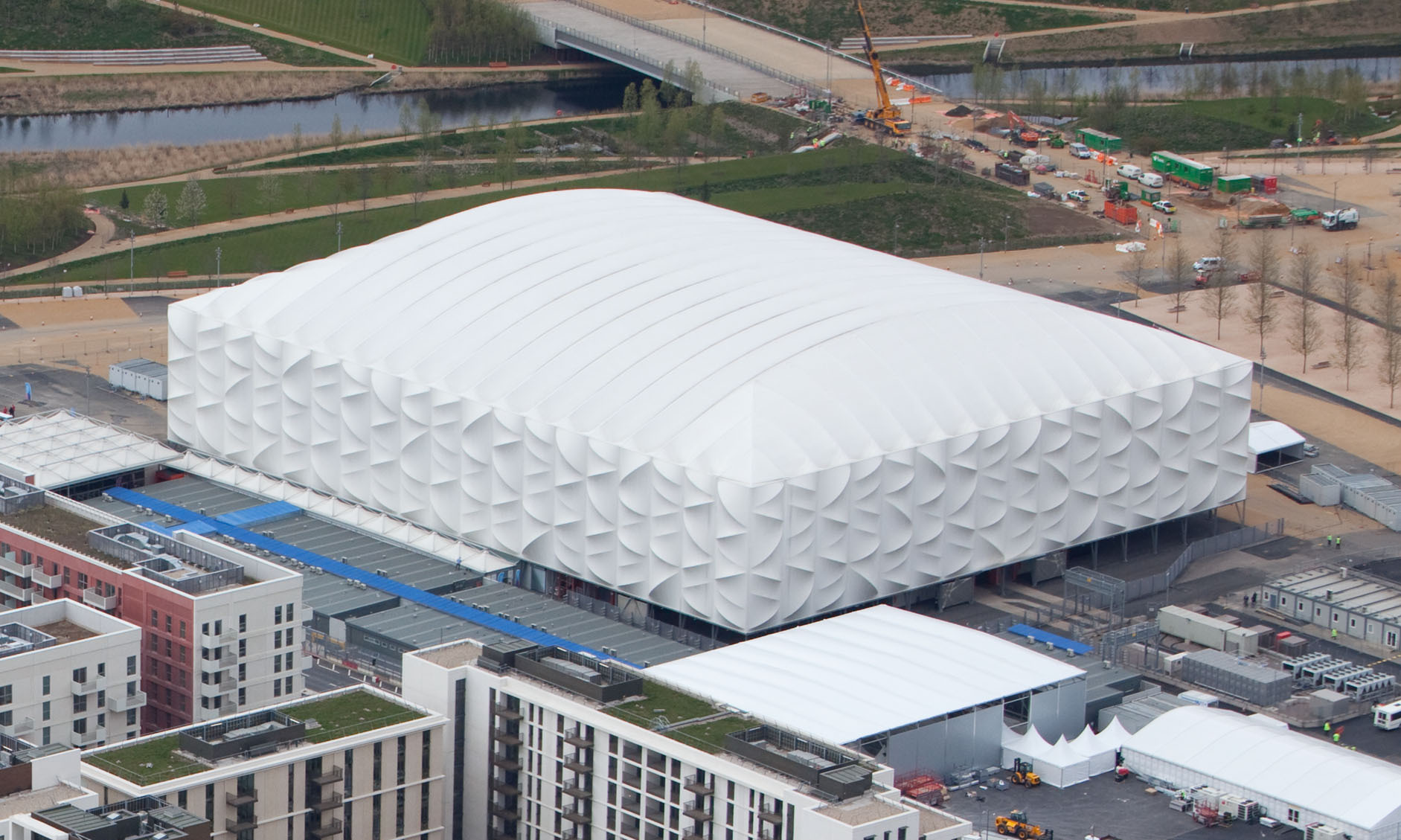
The Basketball Arena hosted basketball at the 2012 Summer Olympics in London.

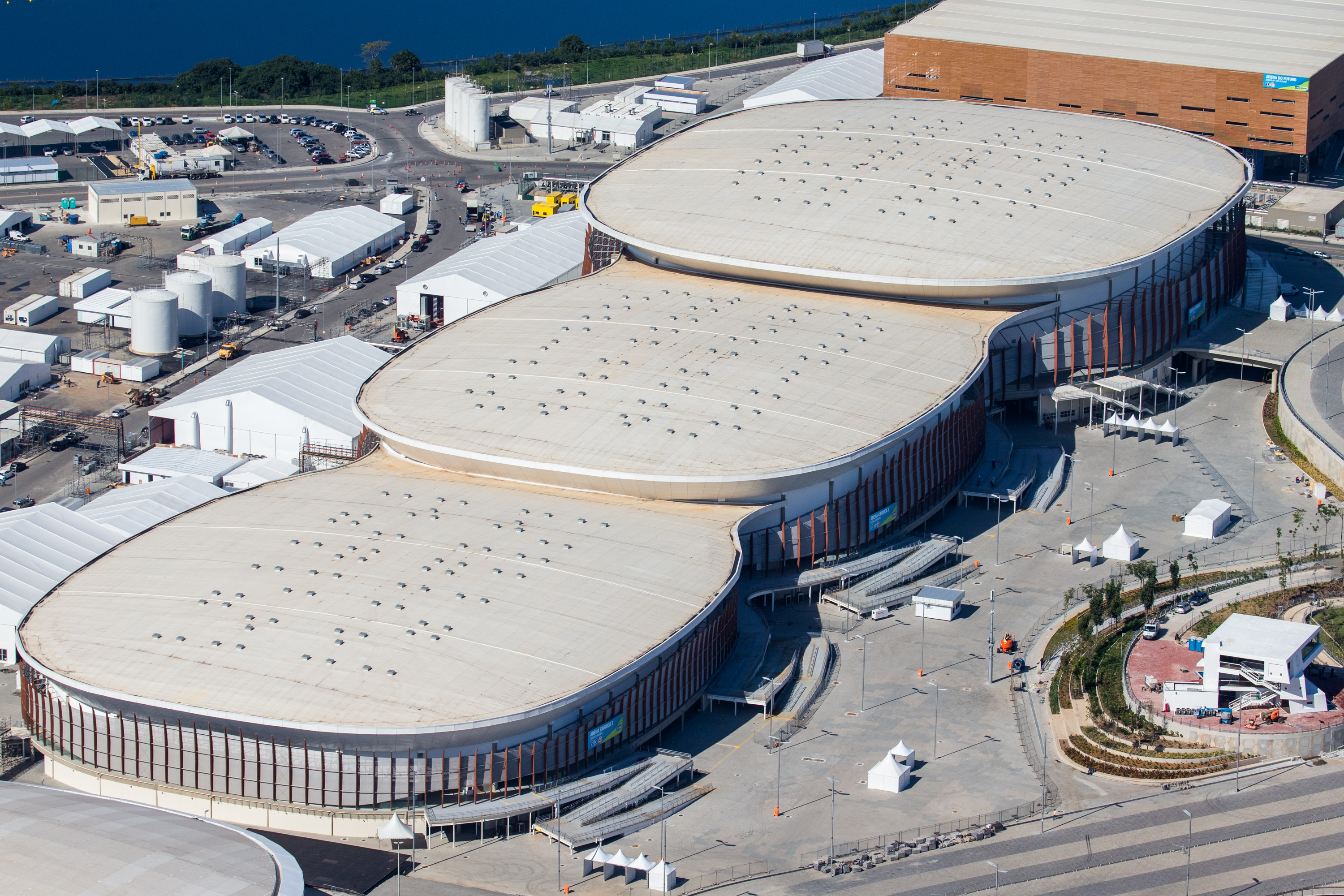
Carioca Arena 1 hosted basketball at the 2016 Summer Olympics in Rio de Janeiro.

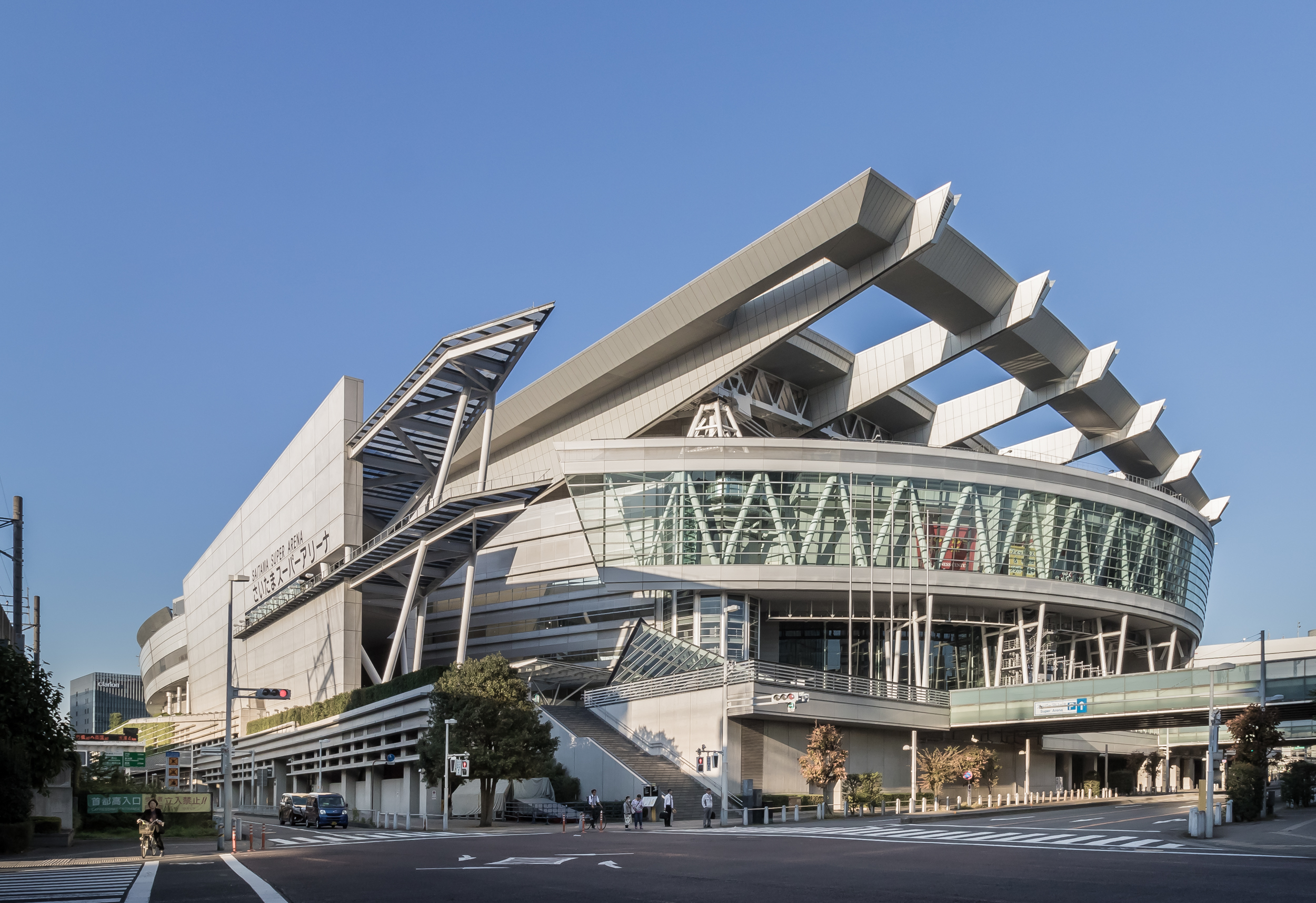
The Saitama Super Arena hosted basketball at the 2020 Summer Olympics in Tokyo.

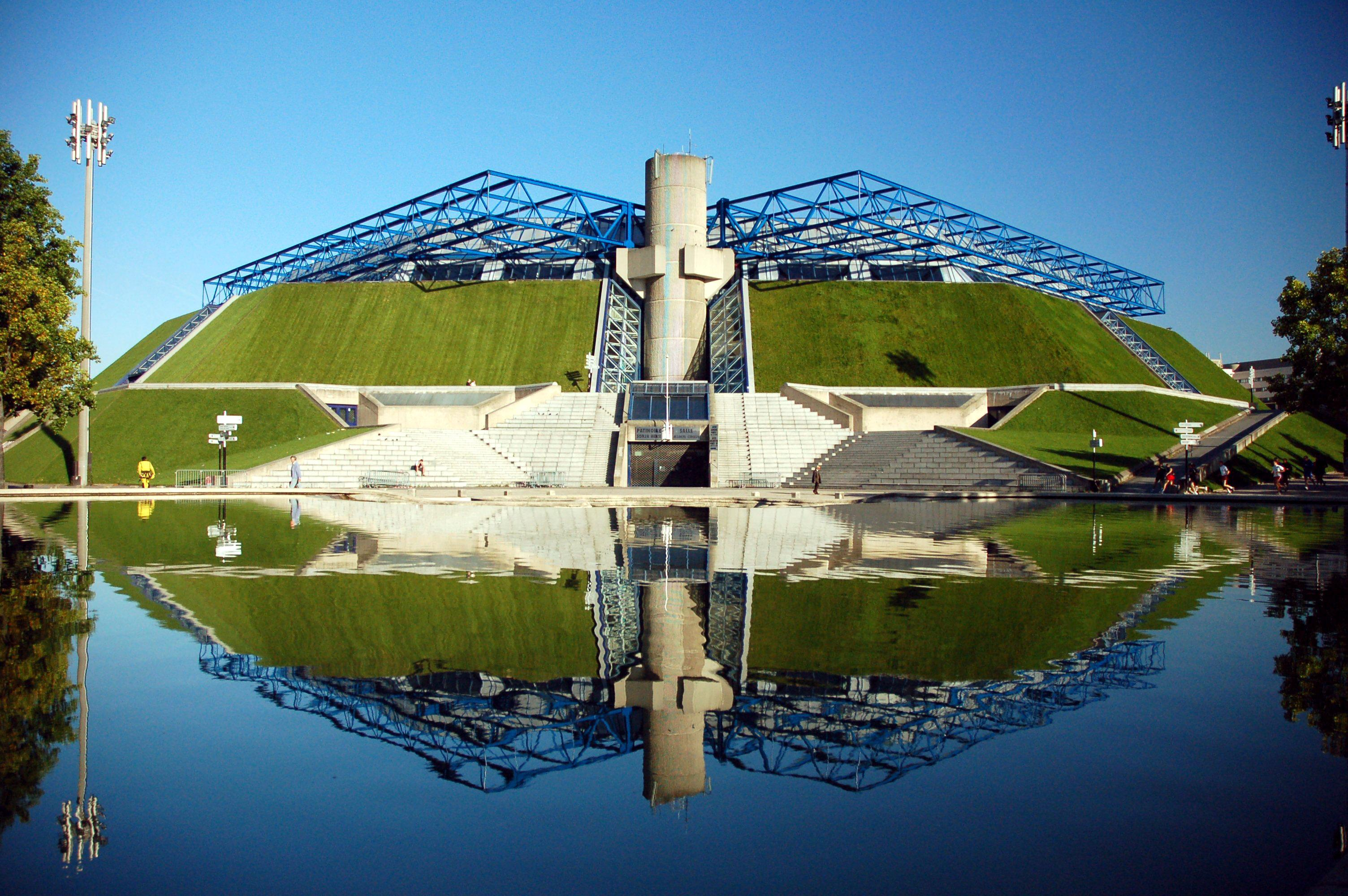
The Accor Arena hosted basketball finals at the 2024 Summer Olympics in Paris.

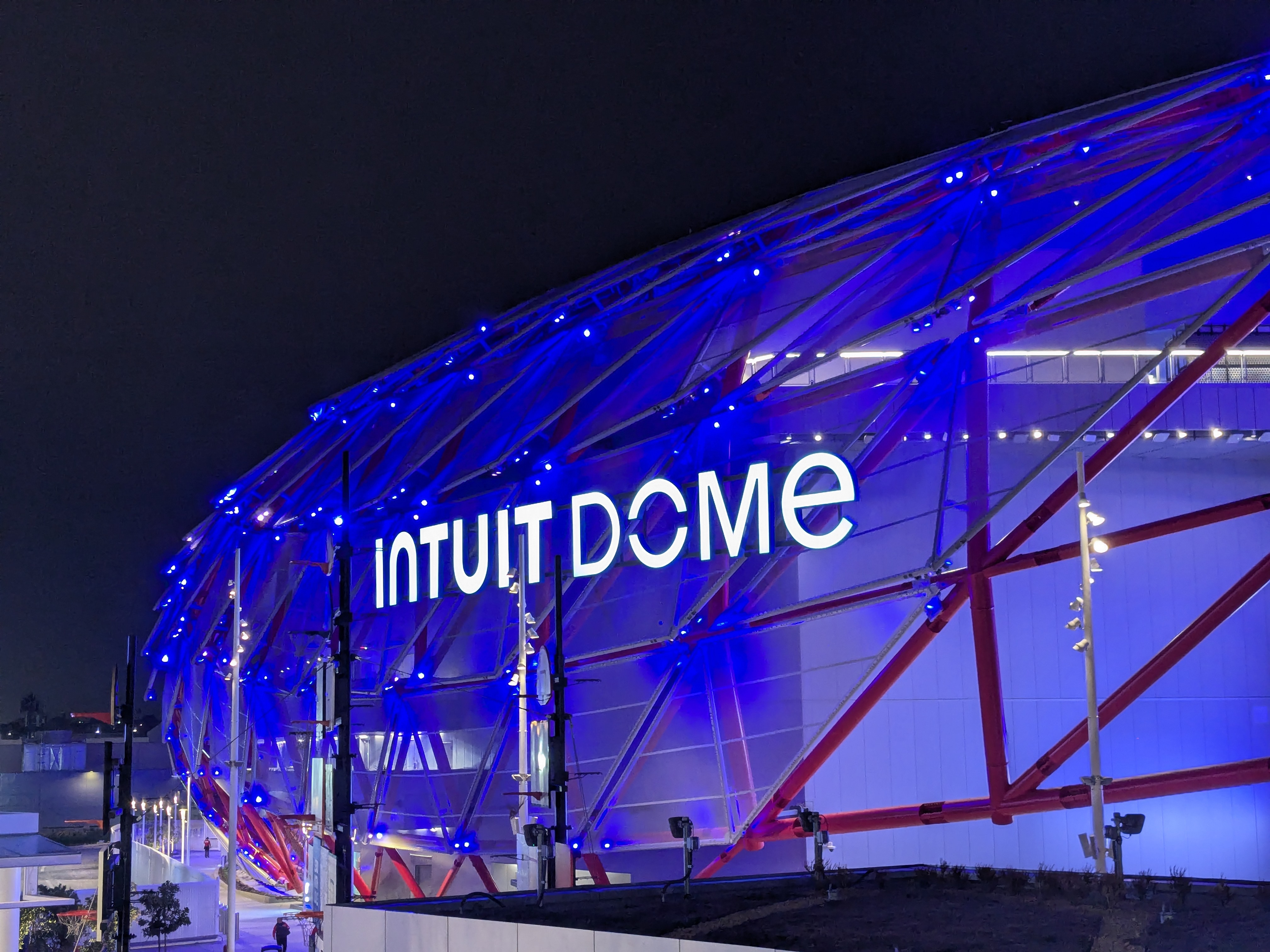
The Intuit Dome will host basketball at the 2028 Summer Olympics in Los Angeles
