= Ilia Karpenkov =

Russian basketball player

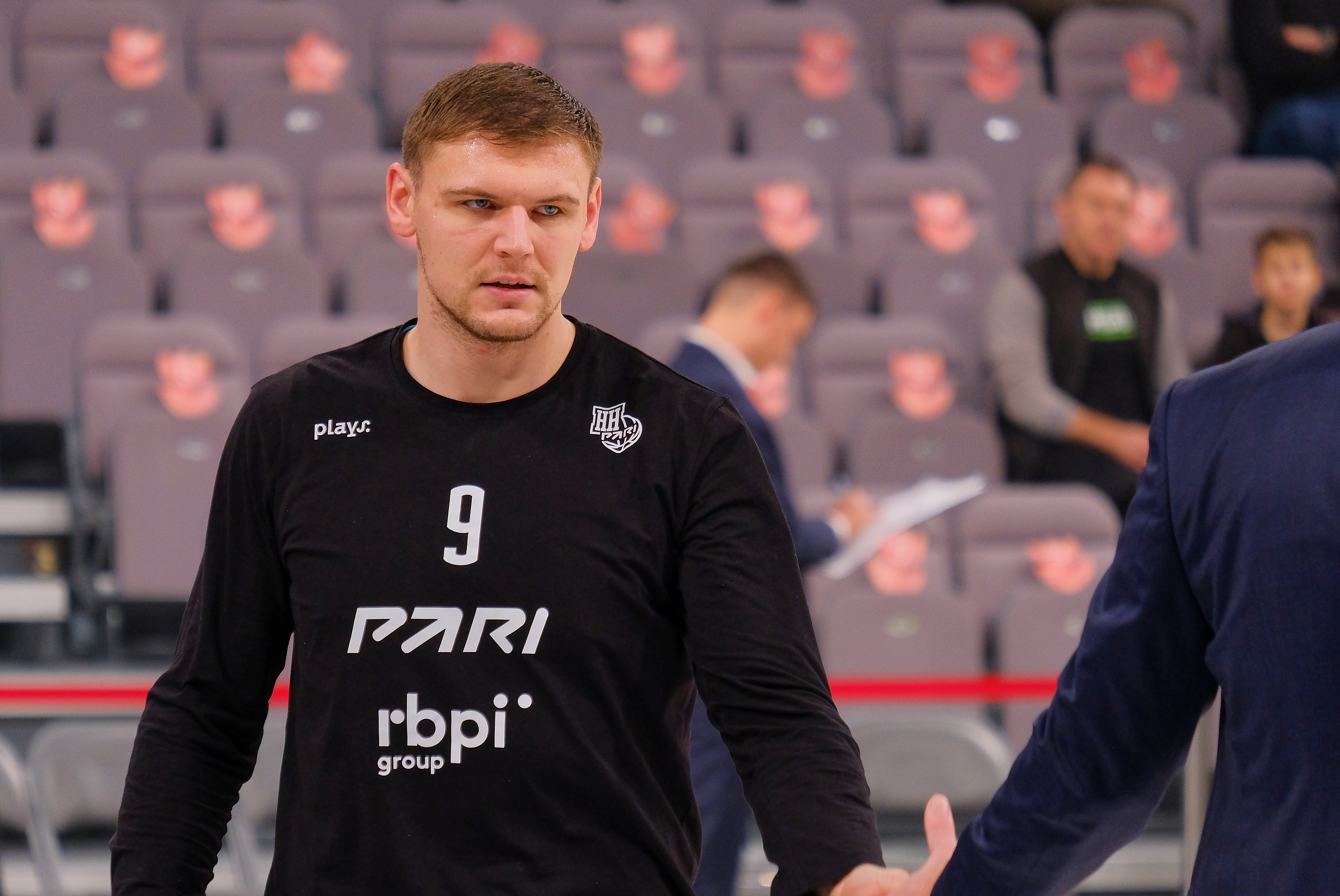

Personal information
- Born: 17 February 1997 (age 29) Mineralnye Vody, Russia
- Listed height: 2.04 m (6 ft 8 in)
- Listed weight: 126 kg (278 lb)
Medals
Men's 3x3 basketball
Representing (Russia) ROC
Olympic Games
| Silver medal – second place | 2020 Tokyo | Team |
Representing Russia
European Games
| Gold medal – first place | 2019 Minsk | Team |

Ilia Alekseyevich Karpenkov (Russian: Илья Алексеевич Карпенков, IPA: [ɪˈlʲja kɐrˈpʲenkəf]; born 17 February 1997) is a Russian basketball player for the Russian 3x3 national team.

He represented Russian Olympic Committee (ROC) at the 2020 Summer Olympics.
