= Alexander Zuev (basketball) =

Russian basketball player (born 1996)

Personal information
- Born: 4 October 1996 (age 30)
Medals
Men's 3x3 basketball
Representing (Russia) ROC
Olympic Games
Silver medal – second place	2020 Tokyo	Team

Alexander Lvovich Zuev (Russian: Александр Львович Зуев, IPA: [ɐlʲɪˈksandr ˈzu(ɪ̯)ɪf]; born 4 October 1996 in Berezniki) is a Russian basketball player for the Russian 3x3 national team.

He represented Russian Olympic Committee (ROC) at the 2020 Summer Olympics.
