= Nick Celis =

Belgian basketball player

No. 55 – Kangoeroes Basket Mechelen
- Position: Guard/forward
- League: BNXT

Personal information
- Born: 24 November 1988 (age 36); Antwerp, Belgium
- Listed height: 1.96 m (6 ft 5 in)
- Listed weight: 102 kg (225 lb)

Career information
- NBA draft: 2010: undrafted

Nick Celis (born 24 November 1988) is a Belgian basketball player for Kangoeroes Basket Mechelen and the Belgian 3x3 national team.

He represented Belgium at the 2020 Summer Olympics.
