= Ryuto Yasuoka =

Japanese basketball player

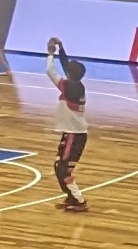
- Yasuoka with Akita Northern Happinets in 2023

No. 24 – Akita Northern Happinets
- Position: SG / SF
- League: B.League, FIBA 3X3

Personal information
- Born: April 27, 1995 (age 31) Koshigaya, Saitama, Japan
- Listed height: 6 ft 2 in (1.88 m)
- Listed weight: 192 lb (87 kg)

Career information
- High school: Nippon Sport Science University Kashiwa (Kashiwa, Chiba)
- College: Edogawa University (2014-2018)
- Playing career: 2017–present

Career history
- 2017-present: Akita Northern Happinets

Ryuto Yasuoka (保岡 龍斗, Yasuoka Ryūto; born April 27, 1995) is a Japanese professional basketball player who plays for Akita Northern Happinets of the B.League in Japan. He also plays for Japan men's national 3x3 team, and competed in the 2020 Summer Olympics. He is the first Olympian from Edogawa University.

== Awards and honors ==
- 3x3 Central Europe Tour 2019 - Chance 3x3 Tour Jindřichův Hradec Champions

== Career statistics ==
Legend
GP	Games played	GS	Games started	MPG	Minutes per game
FG%	Field goal percentage	3P%	3-point field goal percentage	FT%	Free throw percentage
RPG	Rebounds per game	APG	Assists per game	SPG	Steals per game
BPG	Blocks per game	PPG	Points per game	**Bold**	Career high

=== Regular season ===
Year	Team	GP	GS	MPG	FG%	3P%	FT%	RPG	APG	SPG	BPG	PPG
2016-17	Akita	2	0	2.0	.000	.000	.000	0.0	0.0	0.0	0.0	0.0
2017-18	Akita	26	2	12.2	.340	.367	.645	1.8	1.5	1.0	0.1	4.0
2018-19	Akita	57	21	18.0	.368	.311	.804	1.5	1.3	0.7	0.0	5.9
2019-20	Akita	35	14	20.8	.383	.286	.736	1.6	1.7	1.1	0.1	9.1
2020-21	Akita	57	25	16.7	.331	.240	.735	1.6	1.6	0.7	0.1	6.2

=== Playoffs ===
Year	Team	GP	GS	MPG	FG%	3P%	FT%	RPG	APG	SPG	BPG	PPG
2017-18	Akita	3	0	10.15	.444	.444	.000	1.3	0.7	0.3	0	4.0

=== Early cup games ===
Year	Team	GP	GS	MPG	FG%	3P%	FT%	RPG	APG	SPG	BPG	PPG
2018	Akita	2	0	16.06	.111	.000	.000	3.0	0.5	2.0	0	1.0

=== Preseason games ===
Year	Team	GP	GS	MPG	FG%	3P%	FT%	RPG	APG	SPG	BPG	PPG
2018	Akita	2	0	6.2	.000	.000	.000	0.5	0.5	0.5	0.0	0.0
2019	Akita	1	0	11.3	.143	.200	.000	0.0	0.0	0.0	0.0	3.0

Source: Changwon1Changwon2 Source: Utsunomiya

== Trivia ==
- He loves sleeping and practices.
- Spaghetti aglio e olio is his favorite dish.
- He likes not wearing socks in winter.
