= Rafael Bogaerts =

Belgian basketball player (born 1993)

No. 11 – Gembo BBC
- Position: Forward
- League: Belgium 2

Personal information
- Born: 16 August 1993 (age 32) Antwerp, Belgium
- Listed height: 1.98 m (6 ft 6 in)
- Listed weight: 95 kg (209 lb)

Career information
- NBA draft: 2015: undrafted

Rafael Bogaerts (born 16 August 1993) is a Belgian basketball player for Gembo BBC and the Belgian 3x3 national team.

He represented Belgium at the 2020 Summer Olympics.
