= Thibaut Vervoort =

Belgian basketball player

No. 10 – Basics Melsele
- Position: Small forward
- League: Belgium 2

Personal information
- Born: 10 December 1997 (age 28) Antwerp, Belgium
- Listed height: 1.96 m (6 ft 5 in)
- Listed weight: 90 kg (198 lb)

Career information
- NBA draft: 2019: undrafted
Medals
Representing Belgium
Men's 3x3 basketball
European Games
Silver medal – second place	2023 Kraków–Małopolska	Team

Thibaut Vervoort (born 10 December 1997) is a Belgian basketball player for Basics Melsele and the Belgium 3x3 national team.

He represented Belgium at the 2020 Summer Olympics.
