= Belgium at the 2020 Summer Olympics =

- IOC code: BEL
- NOC: Belgian Olympic and Interfederal Committee
- Website: www.teambelgium.be (in Dutch and French)

in Tokyo, Japan July 23, 2021 – August 8, 2021
- Competitors: 121 in 20 sports
- Flag bearers (opening): Nafissatou Thiam; Félix Denayer
- Flag bearer (closing): Grégory Wathelet
- Medals Ranked 29th: Gold 3 Silver 1 Bronze 3 Total 7

Summer Olympics appearances (overview)
- 1900; 1904; 1908; 1912; 1920; 1924; 1928; 1932; 1936; 1948; 1952; 1956; 1960; 1964; 1968; 1972; 1976; 1980; 1984; 1988; 1992; 1996; 2000; 2004; 2008; 2012; 2016; 2020; 2024; 2028

Other related appearances
- 1906 Intercalated Games

Belgium competed at the 2020 Summer Olympics in Tokyo. Originally scheduled to take place from 24 July to 9 August 2020, the Games were postponed to 23 July to 8 August 2021, because of the COVID-19 pandemic. Since the nation's official debut in 1900, Belgian athletes have appeared in every edition of the Summer Olympic Games, with the exception of the 1904 Summer Olympics in St. Louis.

== Medalists ==
Medal	Name	Sport	Event	Date
Gold	Nina Derwael	Gymnastics	Women's uneven bars	1 August
Gold	Belgium men's national field hockey team: Arthur Van Doren; John-John Dohmen; Florent Van Aubel; Sébastien Dockier; Cédric Charlier; Gauthier Boccard; Nicolas De Kerpel; Augustin Meurmans; Alexander Hendrickx; Thomas Briels; Félix Denayer; Vincent Vanasch; Simon Gougnard; Arthur De Sloover; Antoine Kina; Loïck Luypaert; Victor Wegnez; Tom Boon	Field hockey	Men's tournament	5 August
Gold	Nafissatou Thiam	Athletics	Women's heptathlon	5 August
Silver	Wout Van Aert	Cycling	Men's road race	24 July
Bronze	Matthias Casse	Judo	Men's 81 kg	27 July
Bronze	Pieter Devos; Jérôme Guéry; Grégory Wathelet	Equestrian	Team jumping	7 August
Bronze	Bashir Abdi	Athletics	Men's marathon	8 August

== Competitors ==
Sport	Men	Women	Total
Archery	1	0	1
Athletics	16	13	29
Badminton	0	1	1
Basketball	4	12	16
Canoeing	2	2	4
Cycling	8	6	14
Equestrian	5	3	8
Field hockey	17	0	17
Golf	2	1	3
Gymnastics	0	4	4
Judo	3	1	4
Rowing	2	0	2
Sailing	1	3	4
Shooting	0	1	1
Skateboarding	1	1	2
Swimming	1	1	2
Taekwondo	1	0	1
Tennis	2	2	4
Triathlon	2	2	4
Weightlifting	0	2	2
Total	68	55	123

== Archery ==
Belgium archers booked an Olympic place in the men's individual recurve based on the world ranking.

Athlete	Event	Ranking round		Round of 64	Round of 32	Round of 16	Quarterfinals	Semifinals	Final / BM	
Athlete	Event	Score	Seed	Opposition Score	Opposition Score	Opposition Score	Opposition Score	Opposition Score	Opposition Score	Rank
Jarno de Smedt	Men's individual	650	43	Kawata (JPN); W 6–2	Li Jl (CHN); L 5–6	Did not advance				

== Athletics ==
Belgian athletes further achieved the entry standards, either by qualifying time or by world ranking, in the following track and field events (up to a maximum of 3 athletes in each event):

Key

- Note–Ranks given for track events are within the athlete's heat only
- Q = Qualified for the next round
- q = Qualified for the next round as a fastest loser or, in field events, by position without achieving the qualifying target
- NR = National record
- N/A = Round not applicable for the event
- Bye = Athlete not required to compete in round
- DNS = Did not start
- NM = No valid trial recorded

Track & road events
Men

Athlete	Event	Heat		Semifinal		Final	
Athlete	Event	Result	Rank	Result	Rank	Result	Rank
Robin Vanderbemden	200 m	20.70	3 Q	21.00	7	Did not advance	
Kevin Borlée	400 m	45.36 SB	2 Q	DNS		Did not advance	
Jonathan Sacoor	400 m	45.41	3 Q	45.88	8	Did not advance	
Eliott Crestan	800 m	1:46.19	2 Q	1:44.84 PB	4	Did not advance	
Ismael Debjani	1500 m	3:36.00	1 Q	3:42.18	11	Did not advance	
Robin Hendrix	5000 m	13:58.37	16	—N/a		Did not advance	
Isaac Kimeli	5000 m	13:57.36	17	—N/a		Did not advance	
Isaac Kimeli	10000 m	—N/a				28:31.91	18
Michael Obasuyi	110 m hurdles	13.65	6	Did not advance			
Dylan Borlée; Jonathan Borlée; Kévin Borlée; Alexander Doom; Jonathan Sacoor; Robin Vanderbemden*; Julien Watrin*	4 × 400 m relay	2:59.37 SB	3 Q	—N/a		2:57.88 NR	4
Bashir Abdi	Marathon	—N/a				2:10:00 SB	3rd place, bronze medalist(s)
Dieter Kersten	Marathon	—N/a				2:22:06	59
Koen Naert	Marathon	—N/a				2:12:13 SB	10

Women

Athlete	Event	Heat		Semifinal		Final	
Athlete	Event	Result	Rank	Result	Rank	Result	Rank
Imke Vervaet	200 m	23.05 PB	4 q	23.31	9	Did not advance	
Cynthia Bolingo	400 m	DNS		Did not advance			
Elise Vanderelst	1500 m	4:05.63	9 q	4:04.86	11	Did not advance	
Anne Zagré	100 m hurdles	12.83 SB	3 Q	12.78 SB	8	Did not advance	
Hanne Claes	400 m hurdles	56.38 SB	8	Did not advance			
Paulien Couckuyt	400 m hurdles	54.90 NR	3 Q	54.47 NR	3	Did not advance	
Paulien Couckuyt; Camille Laus; Naomi Van Den Broeck; Imke Vervaet; Hanne Claes*; Hanne Maudens*	4 × 400 m relay	3:24.08 NR	3 Q	—N/a		3:23.96 NR	7
Mieke Gorissen	Marathon	—N/a				2:34:24	28
Hanne Verbruggen	Marathon	—N/a				2:38:03	49

Mixed

Athlete	Event	Heat		Final	
Athlete	Event	Result	Rank	Result	Rank
Dylan Borlée; Jonathan Borlée; Kevin Borlée; Alexander Doom; Camille Laus; Imke Vervaet	4 × 400 m relay	3:12.75 NR	3 Q	3:11.51 NR	5

Field events

Athlete	Event	Qualification		Final	
Athlete	Event	Distance	Position	Distance	Position
Ben Broeders	Men's pole vault	5.65	18	Did not advance	
Fanny Smets	Women's pole vault	4.25	=14	Did not advance	

Combined events – Men's decathlon

Athlete	Event	100 m	LJ	SP	HJ	400 m	110H	DT	PV	JT	1500 m	Final	Rank
Thomas van der Plaetsen	Result	11.05	NM	DNS	—	—	—	—	—	—	—	DNF	
Thomas van der Plaetsen	Points	850	0	0	—	—	—	—	—	—	—	DNF	

Combined events – Women's heptathlon

Athlete	Event	100H	HJ	SP	200 m	LJ	JT	800 m	Final	Rank
Nafissatou Thiam	Result	13.54 SB	1.92 SB	14.82	24.90	6.60	54.68 SB	2:15.98 SB	6791 SB	1st place, gold medalist(s)
Nafissatou Thiam	Points	1044	1132	849	896	1040	951	879	6791 SB	1st place, gold medalist(s)
Noor Vidts	Result	13.17 PB	1.83 SB	14.33 PB	23.70 PB	6.32	41.80 PB	2:09.05 PB	6571 PB	4
Noor Vidts	Points	1099	1016	816	1010	949	702	979	6571 PB	4

== Badminton ==
Belgium entered one badminton player into the Olympic tournament. Set to compete at her third consecutive Games, Lianne Tan secured a spot in the women's singles at the Games based on the BWF Race to Tokyo Rankings.

Athlete	Event	Group stage			Elimination	Quarterfinal	Semifinal	Final / BM	
Athlete	Event	Opposition Score	Opposition Score	Rank	Opposition Score	Opposition Score	Opposition Score	Opposition Score	Rank
Lianne Tan	Women's singles	Thuzar (MYA); W (21–6, 21–8)	Tunjung (INA); L (11–21, 17–21)	2	Did not advance				

== Basketball ==
=== Indoor ===
Summary

Team	Event	Group stage				Quarterfinal	Semifinal	Final / BM	
Team	Event	Opposition Score	Opposition Score	Opposition Score	Rank	Opposition Score	Opposition Score	Opposition Score	Rank
Belgium women's	Women's tournament	Australia; W 70–85	Puerto Rico; W 87–52	China; L 74–62	2 Q	Japan; L 86–85	Did not advance		7

==== Women's tournament ====
Belgium women's basketball team qualified for the first time for the Olympics as one of two highest-ranked eligible squads at the Ostend meet of the 2020 FIBA Women's Olympic Qualifying Tournament.

Team roster

The roster was announced on 4 July 2021.

Belgium women's national basketball team – 2020 Summer Olympics roster
Players
Coaches

Pos.	No.	Name	Age – Date of birth	Height	Club	Ctr.
SG	5	Kim Mestdagh	31 – 12 March 1990	1.80 m (5 ft 11 in)	PF Schio	(Italy)
SF	6	Antonia Delaere	26 – 1 August 1994	1.82 m (6 ft 0 in)	Basket Zaragoza	(Spain)
PG	9	Marjorie Carpréaux	33 – 17 September 1987	1.64 m (5 ft 5 in)	Castors Braine	(Belgium)
PF	11	Emma Meesseman	28 – 13 May 1993	1.93 m (6 ft 4 in)	UMMC Ekaterinburg	(Russia)
C	12	Ann Wauters	40 – 12 October 1980	1.95 m (6 ft 5 in)	Free agent
C	13	Kyara Linskens	24 – 13 November 1996	1.93 m (6 ft 4 in)	Nadezhda Orenburg	(Russia)
F	22	Hanne Mestdagh	28 – 19 April 1993	1.78 m (5 ft 10 in)	Namur-Capitale	(Belgium)
F	32	Heleen Nauwelaers	25 – 14 March 1996	1.80 m (5 ft 11 in)	Granada	(Spain)
C	34	Billie Massey	21 – 21 March 2000	1.86 m (6 ft 1 in)	Kangoeroes Basket Mechelen	(Belgium)
PG	35	Julie Vanloo	28 – 10 February 1993	1.68 m (5 ft 6 in)	BC Enisey	(Russia)
PF	42	Jana Raman	30 – 15 February 1991	1.86 m (6 ft 1 in)	CB Estudiantes	(Spain)
PG	55	Julie Allemand	25 – 7 July 1996	1.74 m (5 ft 9 in)	ASVEL Féminin	(France)

Head coach

- (Belgium) Philip Mestdagh

Assistant coach(es)

- (Belgium) Sven Van Camp
- (Belgium) Pierre Cornia

Legend

- Club – describes last
  club before the tournament
- Age – describes age
  on 26 July 2021

Group play

Pos	Team	Pld	W	L	PF	PA	PD	Pts	Qualification
1	China	3	3	0	247	191	+56	6	Quarterfinals
2	Belgium	3	2	1	234	196	+38	5	Quarterfinals
3	Australia	3	1	2	240	230	+10	4	Quarterfinals
4	Puerto Rico	3	0	3	176	280	−104	3	

Source: TOCOG and FIBA
Rules for classification: 1) classification points; 2) head-to-head results; 3) head-to-head game points difference; 4) head-to-head number of game points scored.

27 July 2021
17:20
v

Boxscore

Australia	70–85	Belgium
Scoring by quarter: 17–21, 24–16, 16–19, 13–29
Pts: Magbegor 20; Rebs: George 10; Asts: Mitchell 7		Pts: Meesseman 32; Rebs: Meesseman 9 Asts: Allemand 11

Saitama Super Arena, Saitama
Referees: Juan Fernández (ARG), Amy Bonner (USA), Yener Yılmaz (TUR)

30 July 2021
10:00
v

Boxscore

Belgium	87–52	Puerto Rico
Scoring by quarter: 23–16, 20–8, 17–13, 27–15
Pts: Meesseman 26; Rebs: Meesseman 15; Asts: Allemand 7		Pts: Gwathmey 20; Rebs: Gwathmey, Meléndez 5 Asts: Rosado 5

Saitama Super Arena, Saitama
Referees: Maripier Malo (CAN), Yu Jung (TPE), Kingsley Ojeaburu (NGA)

2 August 2021
17:20
v

Boxscore

China	74–62	Belgium
Scoring by quarter: 17–21, 21–16, 21–15, 15–10
Pts: Li Yue. 14; Rebs: Li Yue. 8 Asts: Wang 8		Pts: Meesseman 24; Rebs: Meesseman 7 Asts: Mestdagh 5

Saitama Super Arena, Saitama
Referees: Leandro Lezcano (ARG), Yener Yılmaz (TUR), Maj Forsberg (DEN)

Quarterfinal

4 August 2021
17:20
v

Boxscore

Japan	86–85	Belgium
Scoring by quarter: 19–16, 22–26, 20–26, 25–17
Pts: Miyazawa 21; Rebs: Akaho 7 Asts: Machida 14		Pts: Meesseman 25; Rebs: Meesseman 11; Asts: Allemand 8

Saitama Super Arena, Saitama
Referees: Yu Jung (TPE), Amy Bonner (USA), James Boyer (AUS)

=== 3×3 basketball ===
Summary

Team	Event	Group stage								Quarterfinal	Semifinal	Final / BM	
Team	Event	Opposition Score	Opposition Score	Opposition Score	Opposition Score	Opposition Score	Opposition Score	Opposition Score	Rank	Opposition Score	Opposition Score	Opposition Score	Rank
Belgium men's 3×3	Men's 3×3 tournament	Latvia; W 21–20	Japan; L 16–18	ROC; W 21–16	Serbia; L 14–21	China; L 20–21	Netherlands; W 16–18 (OT)	Poland; W 16–14	2	N/A	Latvia; L 8–21	Serbia; L 10–21	4

==== Men's tournament ====
Belgium men's national 3x3 team qualified for the Olympics by securing a top finish at the 2021 Universality Olympic Qualifying Tournament.

Team roster

The players were announced on 3 July 2021.

- Rafael Bogaerts
- Nick Celis
- Thierry Mariën
- Thibaut Vervoort

Group play

Pos	Team	Pld	W	L	PF	PA	PD	Qualification
1	Serbia	7	7	0	138	91	+47	Semifinals
2	Belgium	7	4 (Note: Belgium 2–0, Latvia 1–1, Netherlands 0–2)	3	126	127	−1	Semifinals
3	Latvia	7	4	3	133	129	+4	Quarterfinals
4	Netherlands	7	4	3	132	129	+3	Quarterfinals
5	ROC	7	3	4	116	125	−9	Quarterfinals
6	Japan (H)	7	2 (Note: Japan 1–1, 123 PS; Poland 1–1, 120 PS; China 1–1, 119 PS)	5	123	134	−11	Quarterfinals
7	Poland	7	2	5	120	130	−10	
8	China	7	2	5	119	142	−23	

Source: TOCOG and FIBA
Rules for classification: 1) Wins; 2) Head-to-head record; 3) Points scored.
(H) Hosts
Notes:

24 July 2021
18:40
v

Report

Latvia	20–21	Belgium
Pts: Lasmanis 11		Pts: Vervoort 11

Aomi Urban Sports Park, Tokyo
Referees: Markos Michaelides (SUI), Edmond Ho (HKG)

24 July 2021
22:25
v

Report

Belgium	16–18 (OT)	Japan
Pts: Bogaerts 5		Pts: Yasuoka 7

Aomi Urban Sports Park, Tokyo
Referees: Vlad Ghizdareanu (ROU), Su Yu-yen (TPE)

25 July 2021
11:35
v

Report

ROC	16–21	Belgium
Pts: Karpenkov 7		Pts: Celis, Vervoort 7

Aomi Urban Sports Park, Tokyo
Referees: Vlad Ghizdareanu (ROU), Cecília Tóth (HUN)

25 July 2021
15:25
v

Report

Serbia	21–14	Belgium
Pts: Domović Bulut 13		Pts: Bogaerts 6

Aomi Urban Sports Park, Tokyo
Referees: Markos Michaelides (SUI), Cecília Tóth (HUN)

26 July 2021
11:35
v

Report

Belgium	20–21	China
Pts: Vervoort 10		Pts: Hu 9

Aomi Urban Sports Park, Tokyo
Referees: Marek Maliszewski (POL), Cecília Tóth (HUN)

26 July 2021
18:40
v

Report

Netherlands	17–18 (OT)	Belgium
Pts: Voorn 10		Pts: Vervoort 7

Aomi Urban Sports Park, Tokyo
Referees: Markos Michaelides (SUI), Evgeny Ostrovskiy (RUS)

27 July 2021
14:40
v

Report

Belgium	16–14	Poland
Pts: Vervoort 11		Pts: Hicks 8

Aomi Urban Sports Park, Tokyo
Referees: Edmond Ho (HKG), Vlad Ghizdareanu (ROU)

Semifinal

28 July 2021
18:40
v

Report

Belgium	8–21	Latvia
Pts: Vervoort 5		Pts: Lasmanis 9

Aomi Urban Sports Park, Tokyo
Referees: Edmond Ho (HKG), Markos Michaelides (SUI)

Bronze medal match

28 July 2021
21:15
v

Report

Serbia	21–10	Belgium
Pts: Domović Bulut 7		Pts: Vervoort 5

Aomi Urban Sports Park, Tokyo
Referees: Edmond Ho (HKG), Marek Maliszewski (POL)

== Canoeing ==
=== Slalom ===
Belgium entered one canoeist to compete in the men's K-1 class at the Games, as the International Canoe Federation accepted the nation's request to claim an unused berth from the 2020 Oceania Championships.

Athlete	Event	Preliminary						Semifinal		Final	
Athlete	Event	Run 1	Rank	Run 2	Rank	Best	Rank	Time	Rank	Time	Rank
Gabriel De Coster	Men's K-1	152.94	24	98.67	17	98.67	22	Did not advance			

=== Sprint ===
Belgium qualified a boat in the women's K-2 200 m for the Games by finishing fourth overall and second among those nations eligible for Olympic qualification at the 2019 ICF Canoe Sprint World Championships in Szeged, Hungary. Meanwhile, one additional boat was awarded to the Belgian canoeist in the men's K-1 1000 m by winning the gold medal at the 2021 European Canoe Sprint Qualification Regatta.

Athlete	Event	Heats		Quarterfinals		Semifinals		Final	
Athlete	Event	Time	Rank	Time	Rank	Time	Rank	Time	Rank
Artuur Peters	Men's K-1 1000 m	3:41.967	3 QF	3:45.712	1 SF	3:26.773	5 FB	3:26.781	10
Lize Broekx	Women's K-1 500 m	1:52.476	7 QF	1:49.336	2 SF	1:54.489	5 FC	1:56.842	21
Hermien Peters	Women's K-1 500 m	1:47.959	1 SF	Bye		1:52.829	2 FA	1:53.716	6
Lize Broekx; Hermien Peters	Women's K-2 500 m	1:48.137	4 QF	1:47.649	1 SF	1:39.046	5 FB	1:38.475	9

Qualification Legend: FA = Qualify to final (medal); FB = Qualify to final B (non-medal)

== Cycling ==
=== Road ===
Belgium entered a squad of eight riders (five men and three women) to compete in their respective Olympic road races, by virtue of their top 50 national finish (for men) and top 22 (for women) in the UCI World Ranking.

Men

Athlete	Event	Time	Rank
Tiesj Benoot	Road race	6:16:53	58
Remco Evenepoel	Road race	6:15:38	49
Remco Evenepoel	Time trial	57:21.27	9
Wout Van Aert	Road race	6:06:33	2nd place, silver medalist(s)
Wout Van Aert	Time trial	56:44.72	6
Greg Van Avermaet	Road race	Did not finish	
Mauri Vansevenant	Road race	6:21:46	77

Women

Athlete	Event	Time	Rank
Valerie Demey	Road race	Did not finish	
Lotte Kopecky	Road race	3:54:24	4
Julie Van de Velde	Road race	4:01:08	42
Julie Van de Velde	Time trial	34:23.49	19

=== Track ===
Following the completion of the 2020 UCI Track Cycling World Championships, Belgian riders accumulated spots for both men and women in madison and omnium based on their country's results in the final UCI Olympic rankings.

Omnium

Athlete	Event	Scratch race		Tempo race		Elimination race		Points race		Total points	Rank
Athlete	Event	Rank	Points	Rank	Points	Rank	Points	Points	Rank	Total points	Rank
Kenny De Ketele	Men's omnium	11	20	7	28	10	22	0	6	70	13
Lotte Kopecky	Women's omnium	=13	16	DNF	0	DNS				DNF	

Madison

Athlete	Event	Points	Laps	Rank
Kenny De Ketele; Robbe Ghys	Men's madison	32	0	4
Jolien D'Hoore; Lotte Kopecky	Women's madison	−18	−20	10

* Lindsay De Vylder and Shari Bossuyt will travel as reserves

=== Mountain biking ===
Belgian mountain bikers qualified for one men's and one women's quota place each into the Olympic cross-country race, as a result of the nation's thirteenth-place-finish for men and fourteenth for women, respectively, in the UCI Olympic Ranking List of 16 May 2021.

Athlete	Event	Time	Rank
Jens Schuermans	Men's cross-country	1:29:07	18
Githa Michiels	Women's cross-country	LAP (2 laps)	33

=== BMX ===
Race

Athlete	Event	Quarterfinal		Semifinal		Final	
Athlete	Event	Result	Rank	Points	Rank	Points	Rank
Elke Vanhoof	Women's race	12	4 Q	16	6	Did not advance	

== Equestrian ==
Belgium fielded a squad of three equestrian riders into the Olympic team jumping competition by winning the gold medal and securing the first of three available berths for Group A and B at the European Championships in Rotterdam, Netherlands. Meanwhile, two riders were added to the Spanish roster based on the following results in the individual FEI Olympic rankings: a top two finish outside the group selection for Group B (South Western Europe) in eventing and a highest overall placement outside the group and continental selection in dressage.

With Ireland withdrawing from the team dressage competition, Belgium received an invitation from FEI to send a dressage team to the Games, as the highest-ranked composite team, not yet represented. Belgium is hence set to compete in team dressage for the first time since Amsterdam 1928.

Belgian equestrian squads for eventing and jumping were named on June 24, 2021. The dressage team was named on July 3, 2021.

=== Dressage ===
Alexa Fairchild and Dabanos have been named the travelling alternates.

Athlete	Horse	Event	Grand Prix		Grand Prix Special		Grand Prix Freestyle		Total	
Athlete	Horse	Event	Score	Rank	Score	Rank	Technical	Artistic	Score	Rank
Domien Michiels	Intermezzo van het Meerdaalhof	Individual	70.202	28	—N/a		Did not advance			
Larissa Pauluis	Flambeau	Individual	67.251	42	—N/a		Did not advance			
Laurence Roos	Fil Rouge	Individual	70.699	23	—N/a		Did not advance			
Domien Michiels; Larissa Pauluis; Laurence Roos	See above	Team	6702.5	10	Did not advance		—N/a		Did not advance	

Qualification Legend: Q = Qualified for the final; q = Qualified for the final as a lucky loser

=== Eventing ===
Athlete	Horse	Event	Dressage		Cross-country			Jumping						Total	
Athlete	Horse	Event	Dressage		Cross-country			Qualifier			Final			Total	
Athlete	Horse	Event	Penalties	Rank	Penalties	Total	Rank	Penalties	Total	Rank	Penalties	Total	Rank	Penalties	Rank
Lara de Liedekerke-Meier	Alpaga d'Arville	Individual	37.20	33	Withdrawn										

=== Jumping ===
Yves Vanderhasselt and Jeunesse were originally named as the travelling alternates, but for veterinary reasons were replaced by Pieter Devos and Claire Z.

Athlete	Horse	Event	Qualification		Final		
Athlete	Horse	Event	Penalties	Rank	Penalties	Time	Rank
Niels Bruynseels	Delux van T & L	Individual	0	=1 Q	Eliminated		
Jérôme Guery	Quel Homme de Hus	Individual	0	=1 Q	7	99.84	14
Gregory Wathelet	Nevados S	Individual	0	=1 Q	4	84.26	9
Pieter Devos; Jérôme Guery; Gregory Wathelet	See above	Team	4	=2 Q	12	242.02	3rd place, bronze medalist(s)

== Field hockey ==
Summary

Key:

- FT – After full-time.
- P – Match decided by penalty-shootout.

Team	Event	Group stage						Quarterfinal	Semifinal	Final / BM	
Team	Event	Opposition Score	Opposition Score	Opposition Score	Opposition Score	Opposition Score	Rank	Opposition Score	Opposition Score	Opposition Score	Rank
Belgium men's	Men's tournament	Netherlands; W 3–1	Germany; W 3–1	South Africa; W 9–4	Canada; W 9–1	Great Britain; D 2–2	1 Q	Spain; W 3–1	India; W 5–2	Australia; W 3–2^{P} FT: 1–1	1st place, gold medalist(s)

=== Men's tournament ===
Belgium men's field hockey team qualified for the Olympics by winning the gold medal at the 2019 EuroHockey Nations Championships in Antwerp.

Team roster

The squad was announced on 24 June 2021.

Head coach: (New Zealand) Shane McLeod

No.	Pos.	Player	Date of birth (age)	Caps	Goals	Club
4	DF	Arthur Van Doren	1 October 1994 (aged 26)	197	9	(Netherlands) Bloemendaal
7	MF	John-John Dohmen	24 January 1988 (aged 33)	408	27	(Belgium) Orée
8	FW	Florent Van Aubel	25 October 1991 (aged 29)	246	47	(Belgium) Dragons
9	FW	Sébastien Dockier	28 December 1989 (aged 31)	208	60	(Netherlands) Pinoké
10	FW	Cédric Charlier	27 November 1987 (aged 33)	328	50	(Belgium) Dragons
12	DF	Gauthier Boccard	26 August 1991 (aged 29)	233	13	(Belgium) Waterloo Ducks
13	FW	Nicolas De Kerpel	23 March 1993 (aged 28)	72	13	(Belgium) Herakles
14	MF	Augustin Meurmans	29 May 1997 (aged 24)	71	0	(Belgium) Racing
16	DF	Alexander Hendrickx	6 August 1993 (aged 27)	139	50	(Netherlands) Pinoké
17	FW	Thomas Briels	23 August 1987 (aged 33)	352	40	(Netherlands) Oranje-Rood
19	MF	Félix Denayer (Captain)	31 January 1990 (aged 31)	334	20	(Belgium) Dragons
21	GK	Vincent Vanasch	21 December 1987 (aged 33)	244	0	(Germany) Rot-Weiss Köln
22	MF	Simon Gougnard	17 January 1991 (aged 30)	292	20	(Belgium) Leuven
23	DF	Arthur De Sloover	3 May 1997 (aged 24)	96	0	(Belgium) Beerschot
24	MF	Antoine Kina	13 February 1996 (aged 25)	80	6	(Belgium) Gantoise
25	DF	Loïck Luypaert	19 August 1991 (aged 29)	254	44	(Belgium) Braxgata
26	MF	Victor Wegnez	25 December 1995 (aged 25)	101	11	(Belgium) Racing
27	FW	Tom Boon	25 January 1990 (aged 31)	304	124	(Belgium) Léopold

Group play

Pos	Team	Pld	W	D	L	GF	GA	GD	Pts	Qualification
1	Belgium	5	4	1	0	26	9	+17	13	Quarter-finals
2	Germany	5	3	0	2	19	10	+9	9	Quarter-finals
3	Great Britain	5	2	2	1	11	11	0	8	Quarter-finals
4	Netherlands	5	2	1	2	13	13	0	7	Quarter-finals
5	South Africa	5	1	1	3	16	24	−8	4	
6	Canada	5	0	1	4	9	27	−18	1	

Source: Tokyo 2020 and FIH
Rules for classification: 1) points; 2) matches won; 3) goal difference; 4) goals for; 5) head-to-head result; 6) field goals scored.

24 July 2021
11:45
v

Netherlands	1–3	Belgium
Hertzberger 35'	Report	Hendrickx 41', 44', 45'

North Pitch
Umpires:
Marcin Grochal (POL)
Adam Kearns (AUS)

26 July 2021
09:30
v

Germany	1–3	Belgium
Häner 51'	Report	Charlier 5', 7'; Hendrickx 35'

North Pitch
Umpires:
Coen van Bunge (NED)
David Tomlinson (NZL)

27 July 2021
18:30
v

Belgium	9–4	South Africa
Dohmen 4', 15'; Hendrickx 9', 18', 40'; Briels 12'; Van Doren 15'; Gougnard 25'; Charlier 41'	Report	D. Cassiem 5', 31'; M. Cassiem 23'; Ntuli 29'

North Pitch
Umpires:
Raghu Prasad (IND)
Francisco Vázquez (ESP)

29 July 2021
10:00
v

Belgium	9–1	Canada
Hendrickx 12', 40'; Dockier 29', 32'; Denayer 39'; Gougnard 43', 45'; Boon 51'; Van Aubel 55'	Report	Pearson 15'

South Pitch
Umpires:
Simon Taylor (NZL)
Peter Wright (RSA)

30 July 2021
21:15
v

Belgium	2–2	Great Britain
Boon 36'; Briels 43'	Report	Shipperley 17'; Ansell 38'

South Pitch
Umpires:
Simon Taylor (NZL)
Francisco Vázquez (ESP)

Quarterfinal

1 August 2021
18:30
v

Belgium	3–1	Spain
Hendrickx 38', 57'; Boon 41'	Report	Alegre 26'

Umpires:
Adam Kearns (AUS)
Lim Hong Zhen (SGP)

Semifinal

3 August 2021
10:30
v

India	2–5	Belgium
Harmanpreet 7'; Mandeep 8'	Report	Luypaert 2'; Hendrickx 19', 49', 53'; Dohmen 60'

Umpires:
Ben Göntgen (GER)
Coen van Bunge (NED)

Gold medal game

5 August 2021
19:00
v

(silver) Australia	1–1	Belgium (gold)
Wickham 47'	Report	Van Aubel 32'
Penalties
Govers (penalty shoot-out missed); Ogilvie (penalty shoot-out scored); Brand (penalty shoot-out scored); Simmonds (penalty shoot-out missed); Whetton (penalty shoot-out missed)	2–3	(penalty shoot-out scored) Van Aubel; (penalty shoot-out scored) De Sloover; (penalty shoot-out missed) Denayer; (penalty shoot-out scored) Hendrickx

Umpires:
Coen van Bunge (NED)
Marcin Grochal (POL)

== Golf ==
Belgium entered a total of two male golfers and one female golfer into the Olympic tournament.

Athlete	Event	Round 1	Round 2	Round 3	Round 4	Total		
Athlete	Event	Score	Score	Score	Score	Score	Par	Rank
Thomas Detry	Men's	70	67	68	69	274	−10	=22
Thomas Pieters	Men's	65	76	64	68	273	−11	=16
Manon De Roey	Women's	71	67	74	74	286	+2	=46

== Gymnastics ==
=== Artistic ===
Belgium fielded a full squad of four gymnasts in the women's artistic gymnastics events by finishing seventh out of nine nations eligible for qualification in the team all-around at the 2019 World Artistic Gymnastics Championships in Stuttgart, Germany.

Women
Team

Athlete	Qualification						Final					
Athlete	Apparatus				Total	Rank	Apparatus				Total	Rank
Athlete	V	UB	BB	F	Total	Rank	V	UB	BB	F	Total	Rank
Maellyse Brassart	13.766	13.366	13.033	12.766	52.931	35	14.033	—N/a	10.933	—N/a	—N/a	
Nina Derwael	13.900	15.366 Q	13.766	13.566	56.598	7 Q	—N/a	15.400	13.866	13.366	—N/a	
Lisa Vaelen	13.000	14.100	12.500	12.766	52.366	42	14.233	13.766	—N/a	12.900	—N/a	
Jutta Verkest	13.400	13.633	13.666	12.933	53.632	26 Q	13.466	12.466	12.200	13.066	—N/a	
Total	41.066	43.099	40.465	39.265	163.895	5 Q	41.732	41.632	36.999	39.332	159.695	8

Individual finals

Athlete	Event	Qualification						Final					
Athlete	Event	Apparatus				Total	Rank	Apparatus				Total	Rank
Athlete	Event	V	UB	BB	F	Total	Rank	V	UB	BB	F	Total	Rank
Nina Derwael	All-around	See team results						13.900	15.266	13.366	13.433	55.965	6
Nina Derwael	Uneven bars	—N/a	15.366	—N/a		15.366	1 Q	—N/a	15.200	—N/a		15.200	1st place, gold medalist(s)
Jutta Verkest	All-around	See team results						13.400	12.466	12.733	12.633	51.232	23

== Judo ==
Four Judoka have qualified through being in the top 18 of the IJF World Ranking List in their respective class. Additionally, Gabriella Willems received one of the additional places for European athletes, but was unable to compete due to a knee injury.

Athlete	Event	Round of 64	Round of 32	Round of 16	Quarterfinals	Semifinals	Repechage	Final / BM	
Athlete	Event	Opposition Result	Opposition Result	Opposition Result	Opposition Result	Opposition Result	Opposition Result	Opposition Result	Rank
Jorre Verstraeten	Men's −60 kg	—N/a	Plafky (GER); W 01–00	Takato (JPN); L 00–10	Did not advance				
Matthias Casse	Men's −81 kg	Bye	Gandía (PUR); W 11–01	Pacek (SWE); W 11–01	Khubetsov (RUS); W 10–00	Nagase (JPN); L 00–01	Bye	Grigalashvili (GEO); W 10–00	3rd place, bronze medalist(s)
Toma Nikiforov	Men's −100 kg	—N/a	Buzacarini (BRA); W 01–00	Fonseca (POR); L 10–00	did not advance				
Charline van Snick	Women's −52 kg	—N/a	Guica (CAN); W 11–00	Cohen (ISR); W 10–00	Giuffrida (ITA); L 00–01	Did not advance	Giles (GBR); L 00–10	Did not advance	7

== Rowing ==
Belgium qualified one boat in the men's lightweight double sculls for the Games by winning the B-final and securing the last of seven berths available at the 2019 FISA World Championships in Ottensheim, Austria.

Athlete	Event	Heats		Repechage		Semifinals		Final	
Athlete	Event	Time	Rank	Time	Rank	Time	Rank	Time	Rank
Tim Brys; Niels van Zandweghe	Men's lightweight double sculls	6:26.51	2 SA/B	—N/a		6:13.07	3 FA	6:18.10	5

Qualification Legend: FA=Final A (medal); FB=Final B (non-medal); FC=Final C (non-medal); FD=Final D (non-medal); FE=Final E (non-medal); FF=Final F (non-medal); SA/B=Semifinals A/B; SC/D=Semifinals C/D; SE/F=Semifinals E/F; QF=Quarterfinals; R=Repechage

== Sailing ==
Belgian sailors qualified one boat in each of the following classes through the 2018 Sailing World Championships, the class-associated Worlds, and the continental regattas.

Athlete	Event	Race													Net points	Final rank
Athlete	Event	1	2	3	4	5	6	7	8	9	10	11	12	M*	Net points	Final rank
Wannes Van Laer	Men's Laser	~~33~~	25	20	14	28	31	14	18	13	17	—N/a		EL	180	27
Emma Plasschaert	Women's Laser Radial	10	~~17~~	11	8	6	5	5	4	17	21	—N/a		2	87	4
Anouk Geurts; Isaura Maenhaut	Women's 49erFX	17	3	4	14	DSQ	UFD	2	16	15	10	9	9	EL	121	14

M = Medal race; EL = Eliminated – did not advance into the medal race

== Shooting ==
Belgian shooters achieved quota places for the following events by virtue of their best finishes at the 2018 ISSF World Championships, the 2019 ISSF World Cup series, and Asian Championships, as long as they obtained a minimum qualifying score (MQS) of June 5, 2021.

Athlete	Event	Qualification		Final	
Athlete	Event	Points	Rank	Points	Rank
Jessie Kaps	Women's 10 m air rifle	623.4	27	Did not advance	

== Skateboarding ==
Lore Bruggeman and Axel Cruysberghs have qualified for the games by finishing top 16 in the Olympic world skateboarding rankings for the women's street and men's street competitions respectively.

Athlete	Event	Qualification		Final	
Athlete	Event	Opposition Result	Rank	Opposition Result	Rank
Axel Cruysberghs	Men's street	24.81	13	Did not advance	
Lore Bruggeman	Women's street	9.27	11	Did not advance	

== Swimming ==
Belgian swimmers achieved qualifying standards in the following events (up to a maximum of 2 swimmers in each event at the Olympic Qualifying Time (OQT), and potentially 1 at the Olympic Selection Time (OST)): Two-time Olympian Pieter Timmers originally qualified in 2019, however he officially announced his retirement from the sport at the end of 2020 swimming season and instead returned their quota spot.

Athlete	Event	Heat		Semifinal		Final	
Athlete	Event	Time	Rank	Time	Rank	Time	Rank
Louis Croenen	Men's 100 m butterfly	52.23	28	Did not advance			
Louis Croenen	Men's 200 m butterfly	1:55.78	14 Q	1:56.67	16	Did not advance	
Fanny Lecluyse	Women's 100 m breaststroke	1:07.93	26	Did not advance			
Fanny Lecluyse	Women's 200 m breaststroke	2.23.42	11 Q	2:23.73	8 Q	2:24.57	8

== Taekwondo ==
Belgium entered one athlete into the taekwondo competition at the Games. Rio 2016 Olympian Jaouad Achab qualified directly for the men's lightweight category (68 kg) by finishing among the top five taekwondo practitioners at the end of the WT Olympic Rankings.

Athlete	Event	Round of 16	Quarterfinals	Semifinals	Repechage	Final / BM	
Athlete	Event	Opposition Result	Opposition Result	Opposition Result	Opposition Result	Opposition Result	Rank
Jaouad Achab	Men's −68 kg	Pié (DOM); L 11–18	Did not advance				

== Tennis ==
Athlete	Event	Round of 64	Round of 32	Round of 16	Quarterfinals	Semifinals	Final / BM	
Athlete	Event	Opposition Score	Opposition Score	Opposition Score	Opposition Score	Opposition Score	Opposition Score	Rank
Sander Gillé; Joran Vliegen	Men's doubles	—N/a	Koolhof / Rojer (NED); L 3–6, 6–7^{(5–7)}	Did not advance				
Elise Mertens	Women's singles	Alexandrova (ROC); L 6–4, 4–6, 4–6	Did not advance					
Alison Van Uytvanck	Women's singles	Jorović (SRB); W 6–3, 6–2	Kvitová (CZE); W 5–7, 6–3, 6–0	Muguruza (ESP); L 4–6, 1–6	Did not advance			
Elise Mertens; Alison Van Uytvanck	Women's doubles	—N/a	Muguruza / Suárez Navarro (ESP); L 6–3, 7–6	Did not advance				

== Triathlon ==
Belgium qualified four triathletes for the following events at the Games by winning the gold medal and securing the first of three available berths at the 2021 ITU Mixed Relay Olympic Qualification Tournament in Lisbon, Portugal.

Individual

Athlete	Event	Time						Rank
Athlete	Event	Swim (1.5 km)	Trans 1	Bike (40 km)	Trans 2	Run (10 km)	Total	Rank
Jelle Geens	Men's	Withdrew due to positive COVID-19 test						
Marten Van Riel	Men's	17:45	0:40	56:37	0:29	30:21	1:45:52	4
Valerie Barthelemy	Women's	19:18	0:41	1:03:07	0:31	35:12	1:58:49	10
Claire Michel	Women's	19:40	0:44	1:06:34	0:30	43:37	2:11:05	34

Relay

Athlete	Event	Time						Rank
Athlete	Event	Swim (300 m)	Trans 1	Bike (7 km)	Trans 2	Run (2 km)	Total group	Rank
Jelle Geens	Mixed relay	4:11	0:38	9:39	0:26	5:36	20:34	—N/a
Marten Van Riel	Mixed relay	4:04	0:37	9:23	0:26	5:38	20:08	—N/a
Valerie Barthelemy	Mixed relay	4:17	0:37	10:24	0:30	6:20	22:08	—N/a
Claire Michel	Mixed relay	3:53	0:40	10:31	0:29	6:17	21:50	—N/a
Total	Mixed relay	—N/a					1:24:36	5

== Weightlifting ==
Belgian weightlifters qualified for two quota places at the games, based on the Tokyo 2020 Rankings Qualification List of 11 June 2021.

Athlete	Event	Snatch		Clean & jerk		Total	Rank
Athlete	Event	Result	Rank	Result	Rank	Total	Rank
Nina Sterckx	Women's −49 kg	81	7	99	5	180	5
Anna Van Bellinghen	Women's +87 kg	96	11	123	10	219	11

== See also ==
- Belgium at the 2020 Summer Paralympics
