= Mestdagh =

Mestdagh is a Belgian surname. Notable people with the name include:

- Hanne Mestdagh (born 1993), Belgian basketball player
- Kim Mestdagh (born 1990), Belgian basketball player
- Niels Mestdagh (born 1993), Belgian footballer
- Paul Mestdagh (born 1947), Belgian volleyball player
- Philip Mestdagh (born 1963), Belgian basketball coach
