= Equestrian at the 2020 Summer Olympics – Team jumping =

Team jumping at the Games of the XXXII Olympiad
- Equestrian jumping pictogram
- Venues: Baji Koen
- Dates: 6–7 August 2021
- Competitors: 60 from 20 nations

Medalists
1st place, gold medalist(s)		Henrik von Eckermann; Malin Baryard-Johnsson; Peder Fredricson	Sweden
2nd place, silver medalist(s)		Laura Kraut; Jessica Springsteen; McLain Ward	United States
3rd place, bronze medalist(s)		Pieter Devos; Jérôme Guery; Grégory Wathelet	Belgium

The team show jumping event at the 2020 Summer Olympics took place on 6–7 August 2021 at the Baji Koen. Like all other equestrian events, the jumping competition was open-gender, with both male and female athletes competing in the same division. 60 riders (20 teams of 3) from 20 nations competed. The event was won by team Sweden, which included Peder Fredricson, the silver medalist in the individual event. The United states were second, and Belgium third.

In the final, after two jumpers from every team completed, all eight team were still in the competition, France was leading with two penalties, and Sweden, the United States, and Belgium were all tied for the second with four penalties each. These four teams jumped last. Grégory Wathelet from Belgium received eight penalties, and subsequently McLain Ward for the United States and Fredricson received four penalties each and remained tied for the jump-off. Pénélope Leprevost from France, the defending Olympic champion, was jumping last and was eliminated after her horse twice refused to jump. Thus Belgium became third, and in the jump-off there were no penalties but Sweden were faster and took gold.

== Background ==
This was the 25th appearance of the event, which has been held at every Summer Olympics since its introduction in 1912.

The reigning Olympic Champion is France (Philippe Rozier, Kevin Staut, Roger-Yves Bost, and Pénélope Leprevost). The reigning (2018) World Champion is the United States (Devin Ryan, Adrienne Sternlicht, Laura Kraut, and McLain Ward).

== Qualification ==
A National Olympic Committee (NOC) could enter a team of 3 riders in the team jumping event. A total of 20 team quota places were available.

The 20 NOCs that qualified teams (and received automatic entries for 3 riders each in the individual competition) were:

- The host, Japan
- 6 from the World Equestrian Games: the United States, Sweden, Germany, Switzerland, the Netherlands, and Australia
- 3 from the European Jumping Championships: Belgium, Great Britain, and France
- 1 each from the Groups C1 and C2 qualification events: Israel (C1) and the Czech Republic (C2, replacing Ukraine, which failed to submit its NOC Certificate of Capability)
- 3 from the Pan American Games: Brazil, Mexico, and Argentina
- 2 each from the Groups F and G qualification events: Egypt and Morocco (F) and New Zealand and China (G)
- 1 at-large place at the Jumping Nations Cup Final: Ireland

Because qualification was complete by the end of the calendar year 2019 (the ranking period ended on 31 December 2019), qualification was unaffected by the COVID-19 pandemic.

== Competition format ==
For the first time since 1992, the show jumping competition format is seeing significant changes. The five-round format (three-round qualifying, two-round final) has been eliminated, with single rounds for each of the qualifying and final. The top 10 teams advance from the qualifying round to the final. The number of team members per NOC has been reduced from four to three, with no drop scores. The score for the team is the sum of the 3 individual scores. In the qualifying round, if one team member did not finish, the team would still be scored based on the 2 finishing members, but would automatically be ranked behind all teams with 3 finishers.

The qualifying round will feature a course with a minimum distance of 500 metres and a maximum of 650 metres. The speed required is 400 metres per minute, though the Technical Delegate may reduce this to 375 metres per minute. There will be between 12 and 14 obstacles, including 1 or 2 double jumps and 1 triple jump, with a maximum of 17 possible jumps (that is, if there are 14 obstacles, only 1 double jump is permitted). The height of obstacles is between 1.40 metres and 1.65 metres, with spread of up to 2 metres (2.20 metres for the triple bar). In general, ties are not broken; however, for the last advancement place, any tie will be broken by combined time. Only if tied on both faults and time will more than 10 teams advance.

Scores do not carry over from the qualifying to the final. The final will feature a course with a minimum distance of 500 metres and a maximum of 700 metres, with the same speed provisions as the qualifying. The number of obstacles will be from 12 to 14, again with 1 or 2 double jumps and 1 triple jump, with a maximum of 18 possible jumps (14 obstacles with 2 doubles and a triple). The height and spread rules remain the same. Ties are generally broken by time (the round is "against the clock"), but a tie on faults for first place will be broken by a jump-off. A tie for second or third place will only be broken by a jump-off if the faults and time are the same.

The jump-off, if necessary, will feature a six-obstacle course.

== Schedule ==
All times are Japan Standard Time (UTC+9)

Date	Time	Round
Friday, 6 August 2021	19:00	Qualifying round
Saturday, 7 August 2021	19:00	Final round

== Results ==
=== Qualification ===
The best 10 teams (including all tied for 10th place) after the team qualifier progress to the team final.

Rank	Nation	Riders	Horses	Individual penalties	Team penalties	Notes
1	Sweden	Henrik von Eckermann; Malin Baryard-Johnsson; Peder Fredricson	King Edward; Indiana; All In	0; 0; 0	0	Q
2	Belgium	Pieter Devos; Jérôme Guery; Grégory Wathelet	Claire Z; Quel Homme de Hus; Nevados S	1; 1; 2	4	Q
2	Germany	André Thieme; Maurice Tebbel; Daniel Deusser	DSP Chakaria; Don Diarado; Killer Queen	1; 2; 1	4	Q
4	Switzerland	Martin Fuchs; Bryan Balsiger; Steve Guerdat	Clooney 51; Twentytwo des Biches; Venard de Cerisy	1; 0; 9	10	Q
5	United States	Laura Kraut; Jessica Springsteen; McLain Ward	Baloutinue; Don Juan van de Donkhoeve; Contagious	4; 4; 5	13	Q
6	France	Simon Delestre; Pénélope Leprevost; Mathieu Billot	Berlux Z; Vancouver de Lanlore; Quel Filou 13	1; 5; 9	15	Q
7	Great Britain	Holly Smith; Harry Charles; Ben Maher	Denver; Romeo 88; Explosion W	4; 12; 4	20	Q
8	Brazil	Marlon Zanotelli; Pedro Veniss; Rodrigo Pessoa	Edgar M; Quabri de l'Isle; Carlito's Way 6	0; 5; 20	25	Q
9	Netherlands	Willem Greve; Marc Houtzager; Maikel van der Vleuten	Zypria S; Dante; Beauville Z	13; 5; 8	26	Q
10	Argentina	José Maria Larocca; Martín Dopazo; Matias Albarracin	Finn Lente; Quintino 9; Cannavaro 9	7; 14; 6	27	Q
11	China	Li Yaofeng; Zhang Xingjia; Li Zhenqiang	Jericho Dwerse Hagen; For Passion d'Ive Z; Uncas S	15; 13; 7	35	
12	Morocco	Ali Al-Ahrach; El Ghali Boukaa; Abdelkebir Ouaddar	Golden Lady; Ugolino Du Clos; Istanbull V.h Ooievaarshof	10; 6; 21	37	
13	New Zealand	Bruce Goodin; Tom Tarver-Priebe; Daniel Meech	Danny V; Popeye; Cinca 3	17; 13; 9	39	
14	Czech Republic	Ondřej Zvára; Anna Kellnerová; Aleš Opatrný	Cento Lano; Catch Me If You Can OLD; Forewer	15; 17; 13	45	
15	Mexico	Enrique González; Eugenio Garza; Patricio Pasquel	Chacna; Armani SL Z; Babel	1; EL; 5	6+EL	
	Ireland	Shane Sweetnam; Darragh Kenny; Bertram Allen	Alejandro; Pacino Amiro; Cartello	EL; WD; WD	Eliminated	
	Israel	Alberto Michán; Teddy Vlock; Ashlee Bond	Cosa Nostra; Amsterdam 27; Donatello 141	12; EL; WD	Eliminated	
	Japan	Daisuke Fukushima; Koki Saito; Eiken Sato	Chanyon; Chilensky; Saphyr des Lacs	8; WD; WD	Eliminated	
	Egypt	Nayel Nassar; Mohamed Talaat; Mouda Zeyada	Igor van de Wittemoere; Darshan; Galanthos SHK	8; 9; 12	29	DSQ

=== Final ===
Rank	Nation	Riders	Horses	Individual penalties	Team penalties	Notes
=1	Sweden	Henrik von Eckermann; Malin Baryard-Johnsson; Peder Fredricson	King Edward; Indiana; All In	0; 4; 4	8	Jump-off
=1	United States	Laura Kraut; Jessica Springsteen; McLain Ward	Baloutinue; Don Juan van de Donkhoeve; Contagious	0; 4; 4	8	Jump-off
3rd place, bronze medalist(s)	Belgium	Pieter Devos; Jérôme Guery; Grégory Wathelet	Claire Z; Quel Homme de Hus; Nevados S	4; 0; 8	12	
4	Netherlands	Marc Houtzager; Harrie Smolders; Maikel van der Vleuten	Dante; Bingo du Parc; Beauville Z	9; 0; 8	17	
5	Switzerland	Martin Fuchs; Bryan Balsiger; Steve Guerdat	Clooney 51; Twentytwo des Biches; Venard de Cerisy	8; 16; 4	28	
6	Brazil	Marlon Zanotelli; Yuri Mansur; Pedro Veniss	Edgar M; Alfons; Quabri de l'Isle	12; 4; 13	29	
7	Argentina	Fabian Sejanes; Martín Dopazo; Matias Albarracin	Emir; Quintino 9; Cannavaro 9	14; 13; 22	49	
8	France	Simon Delestre; Mathieu Billot; Pénélope Leprevost	Berlux Z; Quel Filou 13; Vancouver de Lanlore	1; 1; EL	2+EL	
9	Germany	André Thieme; Maurice Tebbel; Daniel Deusser	DSP Chakaria; Don Diarado; Killer Queen	8; 4; RT	12+RT	
10	Great Britain	Holly Smith; Harry Charles; Ben Maher	Denver; Romeo 88; Explosion W	16; 8; WD	24+WD	

==== Jump-off ====
Rank	Nation	Riders	Horses	Individual penalties	Team penalties	Individual time	Team time	Notes
1st place, gold medalist(s)	Sweden	Henrik von Eckermann; Malin Baryard-Johnsson; Peder Fredricson	King Edward; Indiana; All In	0; 0; 0	0	42.00; 41.89; 39.01	122.90	
2nd place, silver medalist(s)	United States	Laura Kraut; Jessica Springsteen; McLain Ward	Baloutinue; Don Juan van de Donkhoeve; Contagious	0; 0; 0	0	41.33; 42.95; 39.92	124.20	

*WD = Withdrawn *RT = Retired *EL = Eliminated
