= Rumson Country Day School =

The Rumson Country Day School

Location
- 35 Bellevue Avenue; Rumson, Monmouth County, New Jersey 07760; United States; 40.3631°N 74.0128°W

Information
- Type: Private school
- Motto: "Vitae Disce" ("Learn For Life")
- Established: November 1, 1926
- Headmaster: Carson Smith
- Faculty: 62
- Grades: Nursery - 8
- Enrollment: 432 (in N-8 as of 2013-14)
- Student to teacher ratio: 7.1:1
- Colors: Green and White
- Nickname: Gators
- Website: School website

Founded in 1926, the Rumson Country Day School is a coeducational, nonsectarian independent day school located on a 14,000-square-foot (1,300 m^{2}) campus in Rumson, New Jersey, specializing in educating boys and girls from nursery (age three) through eighth grade. The Rumson Country Day School has probationary accreditation from the Middle States Association of Colleges and Schools and is a member of the New Jersey Association of Independent Schools.

== Awards and recognition ==
For the 1998-99 school year, The Rumson Country Day School received the Blue Ribbon Award from the United States Department of Education, the highest honor that an American school can achieve.

== School population ==
As of the 2023-24 school year, the school has an enrollment of 336 students (in grades N-8) and 63 classroom teachers, for a student-teacher ratio of 6:1. In Grades N-5, students are divided into heterogeneous homerooms with a maximum size of 15 students per homeroom. In Grades 6-8 (Upper School), classes are departmentalized and honors sections are offered in English, math and foreign language (French and Spanish). Students in seventh and eighth grades take Latin in addition to their world language selection. The Rumson Country Day School has 61 full-time and 2 part-time teachers. Teachers have an average of 18 years of experience, with 13 of those years at RCDS. The school has a student/teacher ratio of 6:1 and average class size of 12-15.

== Classes ==
The school offers a traditional curriculum of English grammar and literature, mathematics, science, social studies, foreign language (French, Spanish, and Latin), art, crafts, wood shop, music and physical education. The school also offers a School Within A School program called The Carmody School, which helps children with learning differences.

In September 2010, the school officially opened the new William I. Riker Academic Center, an addition covering 22,000 square feet (2,000 m^{2}) that includes a new main library, new computer lab and art rooms, a seminar room and three new age-specific science labs.

== Sports ==
Interscholastic sports were started at RCDS in 1946. Sports are played throughout the academic year. Fall sports are soccer (boys and girls), football, and field hockey. Winter sports include: basketball (boys and girls), and ice hockey: started in 2007 with one game which was won 4-0 against Princeton Day School. Spring sports include lacrosse (boys and girls), baseball, tennis, and softball.

== Notable alumni ==
- Joe Kyrillos (born 1960) politician and businessman who served in the New Jersey Senate and the New Jersey General Assembly.
- Jessica Springsteen (born 1991), equestrian who won a silver medal in the Team jumping at the 2020 Summer Olympics held in 2021 in Tokyo.
- Kelsey Grammer (1955), actor who is well-known for playing psychiatrist Frasier Crane in the sitcom Cheers.
