= Tebbel =

Tebbel is the surname of the following people:

- John William Tebbel (1912–2004), American journalist, media historian
- Maurice Tebbel (born 1994), German equestrian
- René Tebbel (born 1969), German-born equestrian show jumping rider
