= Grégory Wathelet =

Belgian equestrian

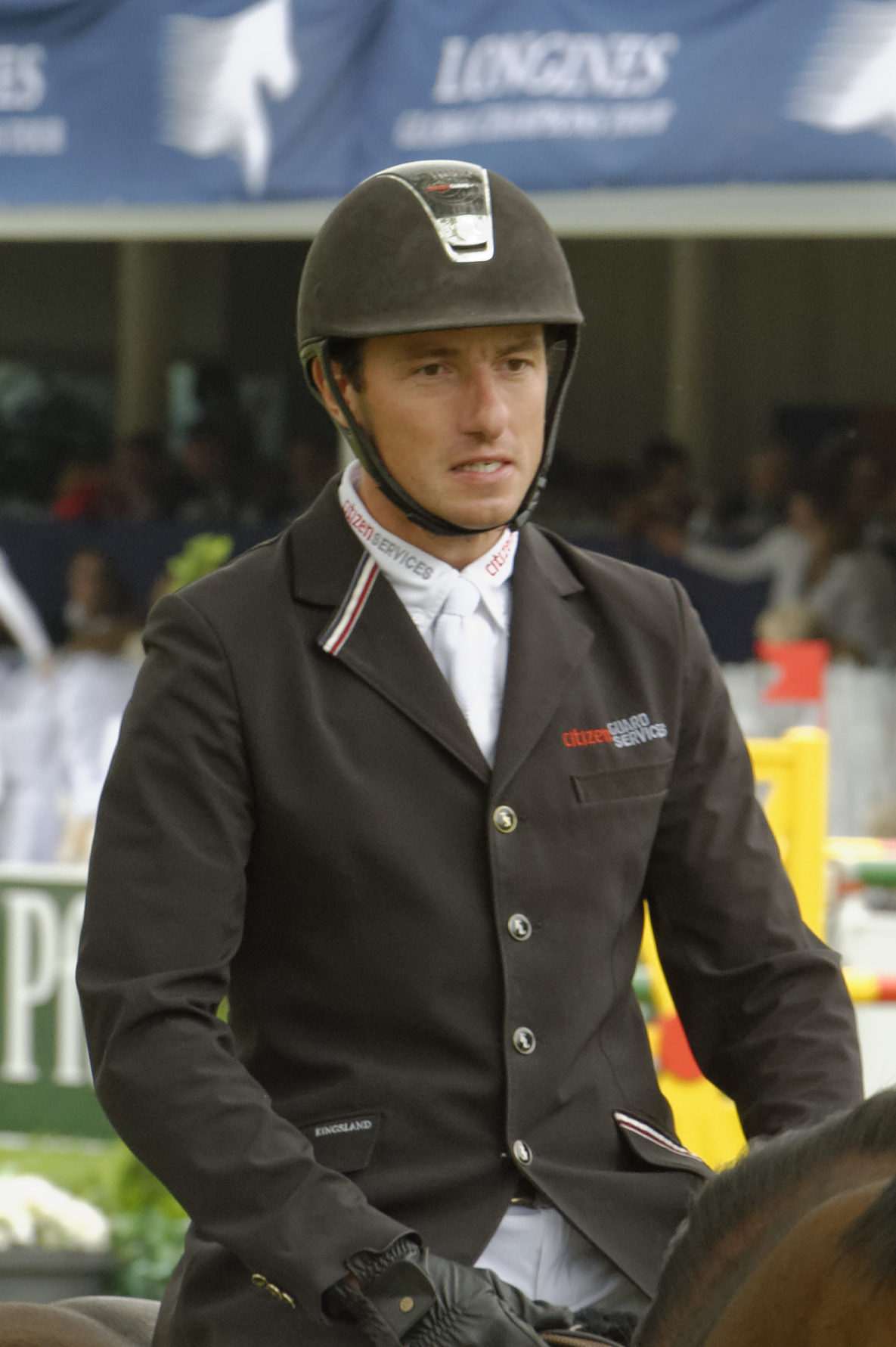

Personal information
- Nationality: Belgian
- Discipline: Show jumping
- Born: 10 September 1980 (age 45); Huy, Belgium
- Height: 6 ft 2.5 in (1.89 m)
- Weight: 187 lb (85 kg; 13 st 5 lb)
Medal record
Representing Belgium
Olympic Games
Bronze medal – third place	2020 Tokyo	Team jumping
European Championships
Gold medal – first place	2019 Rotterdam	Team jumping
Silver medal – second place	2015 Aachen	Individual jumping

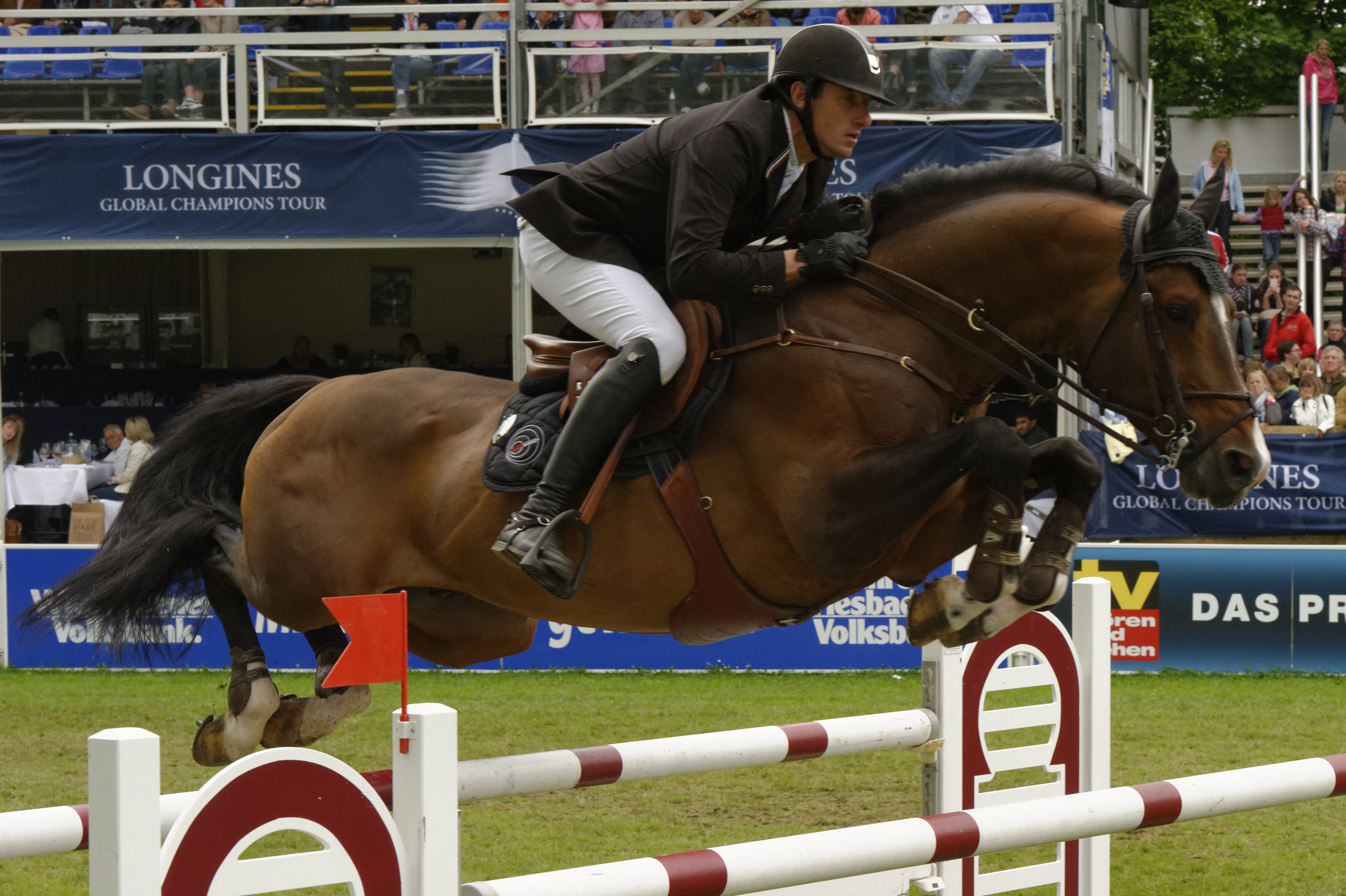
Wiesbaden 2013

Grégory Wathelet (born 10 September 1980 age 42) is a Belgian equestrian who competes in the sport of show jumping.

At the 2012 Summer Olympics in London, he was a member of the Belgian team in the team jumping competition which his team, composed of Le Jeune, Demeersman and Lansink, finished in thirteenth place. At the 2020 Summer Olympics in Tokyo, having finished 9th in the Individual jumping, he was a member of the Belgian team in the team jumping competition which his team, composed of Devos and Guery, finished in third place, giving Belgium its first equestrian medal since the 1976 Summer Olympics. He was the Belgian flag bearer in the closing ceremony of the 2020 Summer Olympics where he became 4th.

== International Championship Results ==
Results
Year	Event	Horse	Placing	Notes
2001	European Young Rider Championships	Firis de la Maine	6th	Team
2001	European Young Rider Championships	Firis de la Maine	26th	Individual
2006	World Equestrian Games	Loriot	4th	Team
2006	World Equestrian Games	Loriot	26th	Individual
2007	European Championships	Lantinus 3	9th	Team
2007	European Championships	Lantinus 3	40th	Individual
2011	European Championships	HH Copin van de Broy	7th	Team
2011	European Championships	HH Copin van de Broy	24th	Individual
2012	Olympic Games	Citzenguard Cadjanine Z	13th	Team
2012	Olympic Games	Citzenguard Cadjanine Z	29th	Individual
2013	World Young Horse Championships	Sothis D'Ouilly	12th	7 Year Olds
2013	World Young Horse Championships	Benito	31st	7 Year Olds
2014	World Equestrian Games	HH Conrad	13th	Team
2014	World Equestrian Games	HH Conrad	25th	Individual
2015	European Championships	HH Conrad	11th	Team
2015	European Championships	HH Conrad	2nd place, silver medalist(s)	Individual
2016	World Young Horse Championships	Picobello Jasmine	14th	7 Year Olds
2017	World Cup Final	Forlap	7th	
2017	European Championships	Coree	4th	Team
2017	European Championships	Coree	18th	Individual
2017	World Young Horse Championships	Picobello Full House Ter Linden Z	22nd	7 Year Olds
2019	European Championships	MJT Nevados S	1st place, gold medalist(s)	Team
2019	European Championships	MJT Nevados S	9th	Individual
2021	Olympic Games	MJT Nevados S	3rd place, bronze medalist(s)	Team
2021	Olympic Games	MJT Nevados S	9th	Individual
EL = Eliminated; RET = Retired; WD = Withdrew
