= Jessica Springsteen =

American show jumping rider (born 1991)

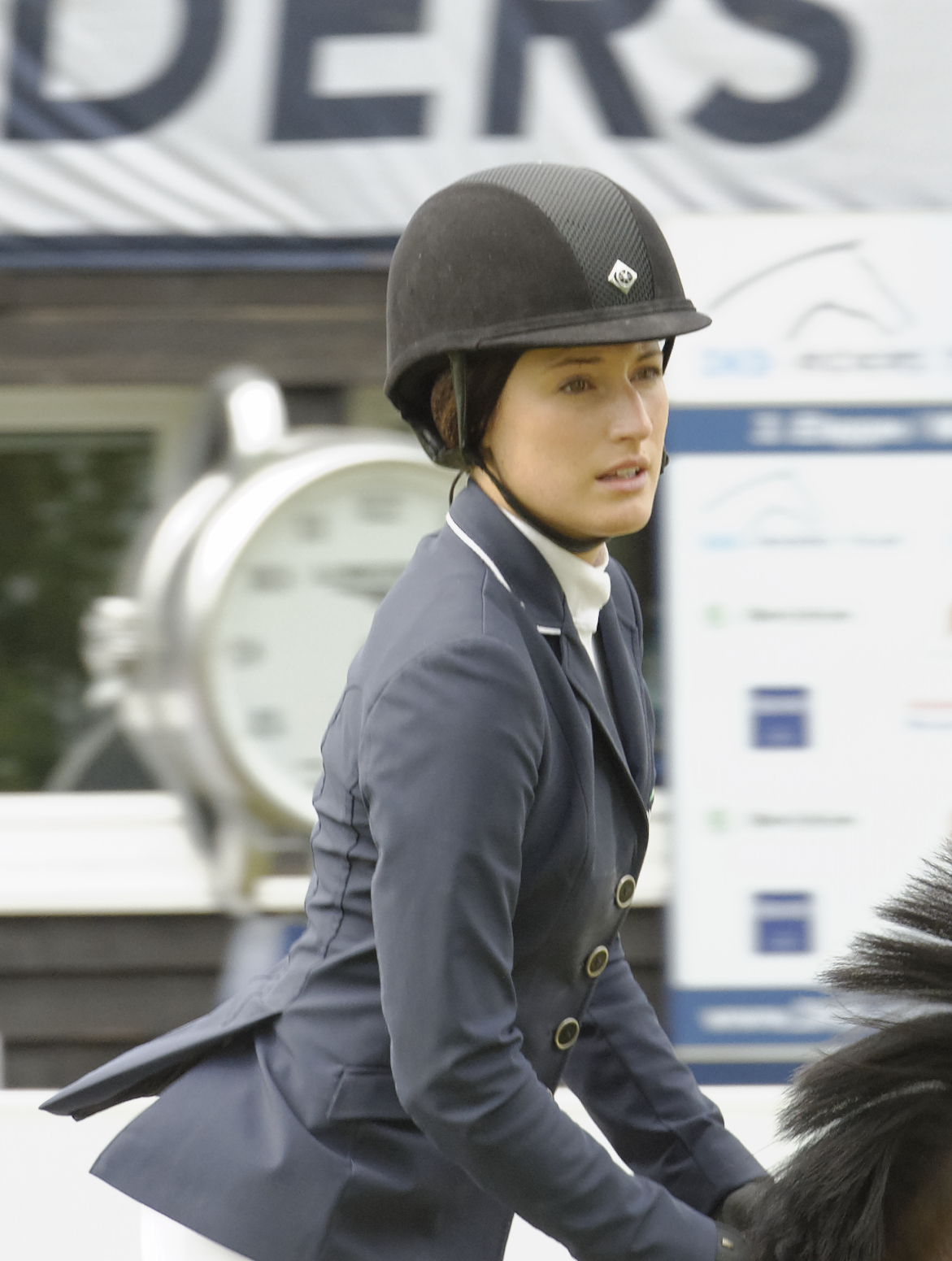
- Springsteen in 2013

Personal information
- Born: Jessica Rae Springsteen; December 30, 1991 (age 34) Los Angeles, California, U.S.
- Relatives: Bruce Springsteen (father); Patti Scialfa (mother); Pamela Springsteen (aunt)
Medal record
Equestrian
Representing the United States
Olympic Games
Silver medal – second place	2020 Tokyo	Team jumping

Jessica Rae Springsteen (born December 30, 1991) is an American equestrian. The daughter of musicians Bruce Springsteen and Patti Scialfa, she is a show jumping champion rider who has represented the United States Equestrian Team in international competition and won a silver medal in the Team jumping at the 2020 Summer Olympics held in 2021 in Tokyo.

== Early life ==
Jessica Rae Springsteen was born on December 30, 1991, the second child and only daughter of musicians Bruce Springsteen and Patti Scialfa. She has one older brother, Evan James Springsteen (born July 25, 1990), and one younger brother, Samuel Ryan Springsteen (born January 5, 1994). When she and her brothers reached school age in the early 1990s, their parents left Los Angeles with them specifically to raise a family in a non-paparazzi environment. The family owned and lived on a horse farm in Colts Neck Township, New Jersey. They also owned homes in Los Angeles, as well as in Wellington, Florida, and Rumson, New Jersey.

Springsteen attended the Rumson Country Day School and Ranney School in New Jersey. She earned an undergraduate degree from Duke University on May 11, 2014. After embarking on a career as a show jumping rider, she also did some modeling and was named the equestrian ambassador for Gucci. Springsteen also became a Rolex Testimonee in 2022.

== Career ==
Springsteen has been riding since she was four years old, with horses kept on the Springsteen family's 300-acre Stone Hill Farm in Colts Neck, New Jersey. She got her first pony when she was six years old. As a youth equitation rider, she first won classes in the pony division, including the Washington International Pony Equitation Classic Final, and as a teen won the 2008 ASPCA Maclay National Championship in a ride-off where her particularly bold riding stood out. She also won the 2009 George H. Morris Excellence in Equitation Championship.

"After you have been to so many shows year after year, you realize how difficult it is and what an achievement it is. You also realize how good the other riders are and how much work has gone into it. You see a culmination of 13 years of riding come down to 1 minute and 30 seconds. That is a tough lesson in life. Musicians always get to sing it again; riders get one shot."

— Bruce Springsteen, on his daughter's Maclay win

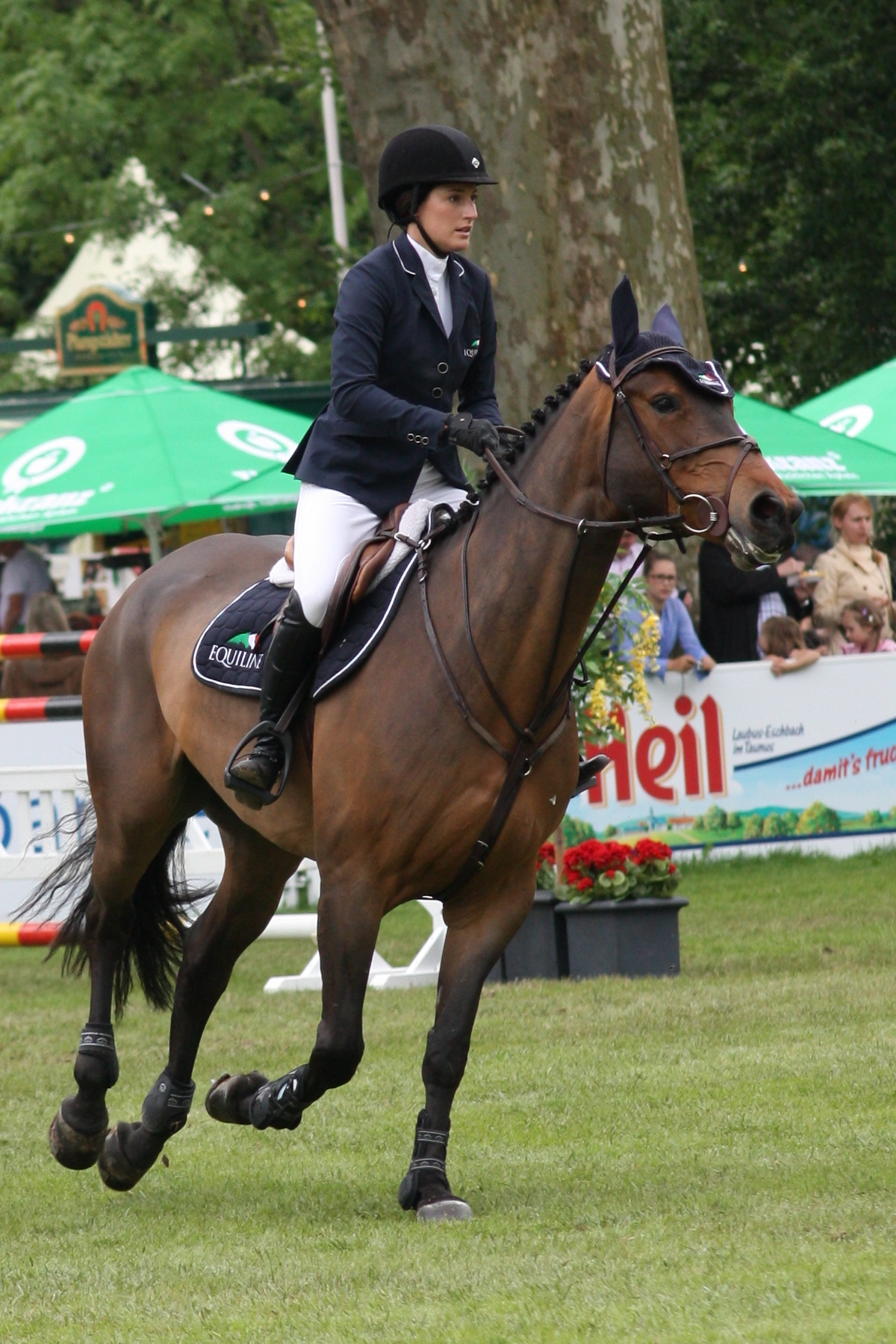
Springsteen on Wotsamillion in 2013

As an adult competitor, Springsteen competed in the Royal Windsor Horse Show in 2011, competing on her horse Vordnado Van Den Hoendrik. Jumping at Chantilly in July 2012, she became a champion with Irish Sport Horse gelding Wotsamillion of which Bruce Springsteen would later joke "I am already working on a ‘Wotsamillion’ song."

In September 2012, Peter Charles, who had represented Great Britain at the 2012 Summer Olympics in the Equestrian events, sold his team gold medal-winning horse, Vindicat W, to Springsteen. Springsteen herself was an alternate rider for the United States at the 2012 Summer Olympics. Springsteen and model Edie Campbell competed in coordinating "white swan/black swan" themed costumes at the 2013 Gucci Masters in Paris, a charity event for Princess Caroline's Association Mondiale de Amis de l’Enfance (AMADE). In 2014, Springsteen won the American Gold Cup.

In 2016, she won her first five-star Grand Prix jumping competition with her horse Cynar VA, but did not make the short list for the U.S. Equestrian team for the 2016 Summer Olympics. In May 2017, she won the Falcon Stakes CSI 5* at the Royal Windsor Horse Show riding Davendy S.

She formerly trained with Frank and Stacia Klein Madden and then trained with Laura Kraut from 2010 to 2015. Since May 2015 she trains with Edwina Tops-Alexander.

In 2021, Springsteen was selected in the US team to compete in equestrian at the 2020 Summer Olympics, which had been postponed due to the COVID-19 pandemic. She finished equal 31st in the qualifying round of the individual jumping, but only the top 30 advanced to the medals round. On August 7, 2021, she was part of the U.S. team that won the silver medal in the Team jumping.

== Personal life ==
Springsteen was in a relationship with fellow equestrian the Italian, Lorenzo De Luca.

She is now in a relationship with the Belgian rider Nicola Philippaerts, with whom she's expecting her first child.

== Gallery ==
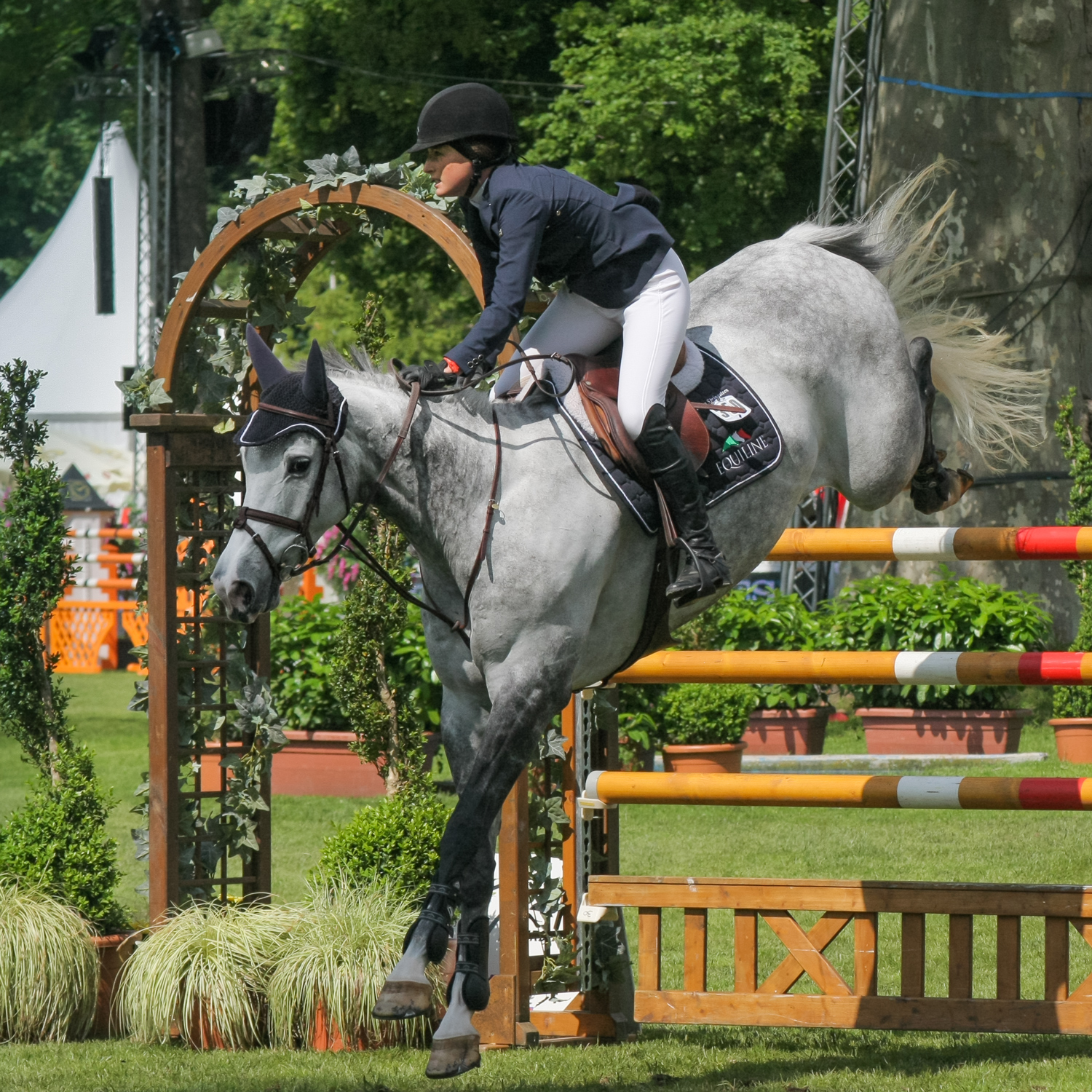
Springsteen on Zero at Wiesbaden, 2013

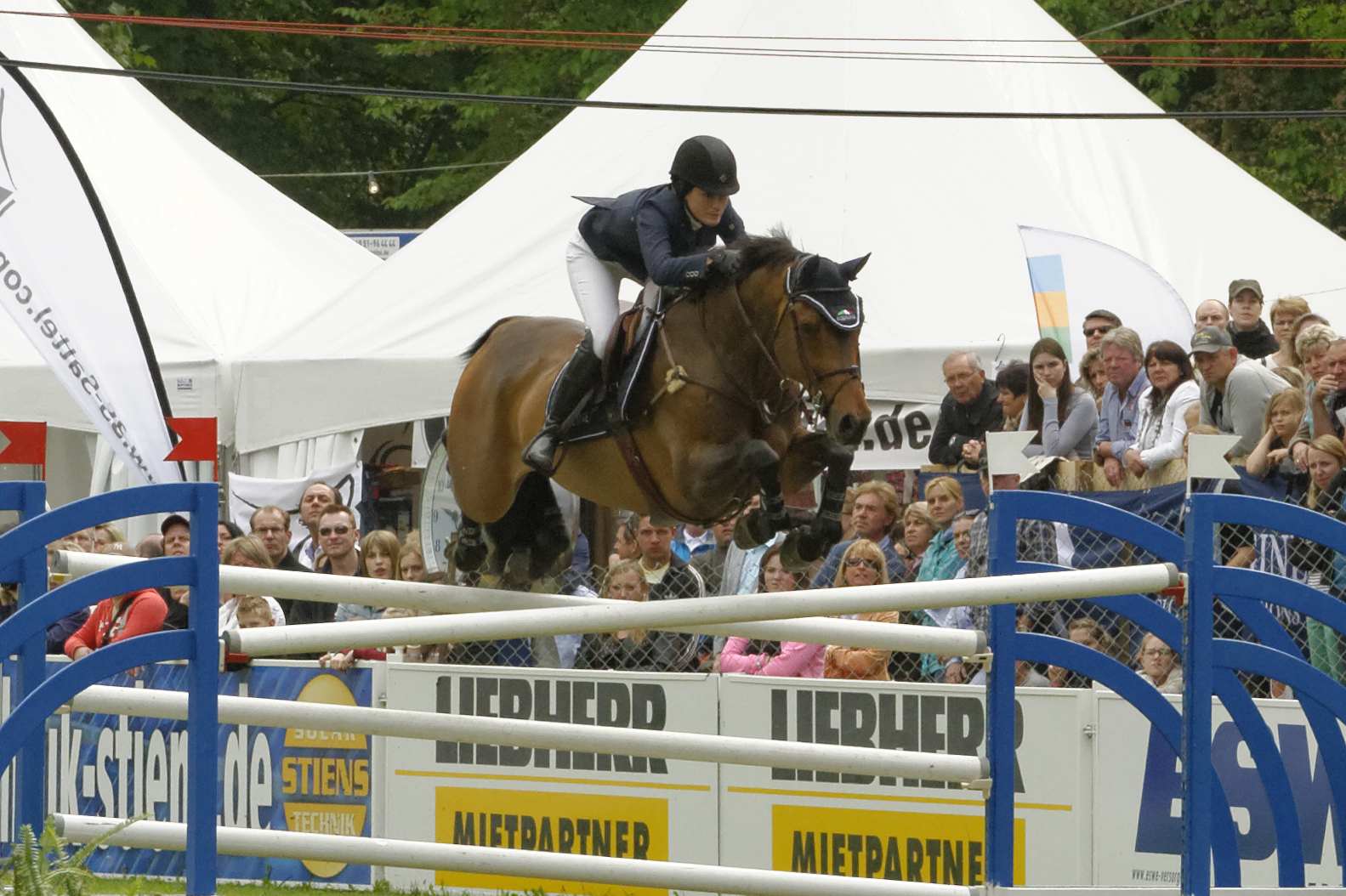
Springsteen on Vindicat W at Wiesbaden, 2013
