= Pieter Devos =

Belgian professional Equestrian

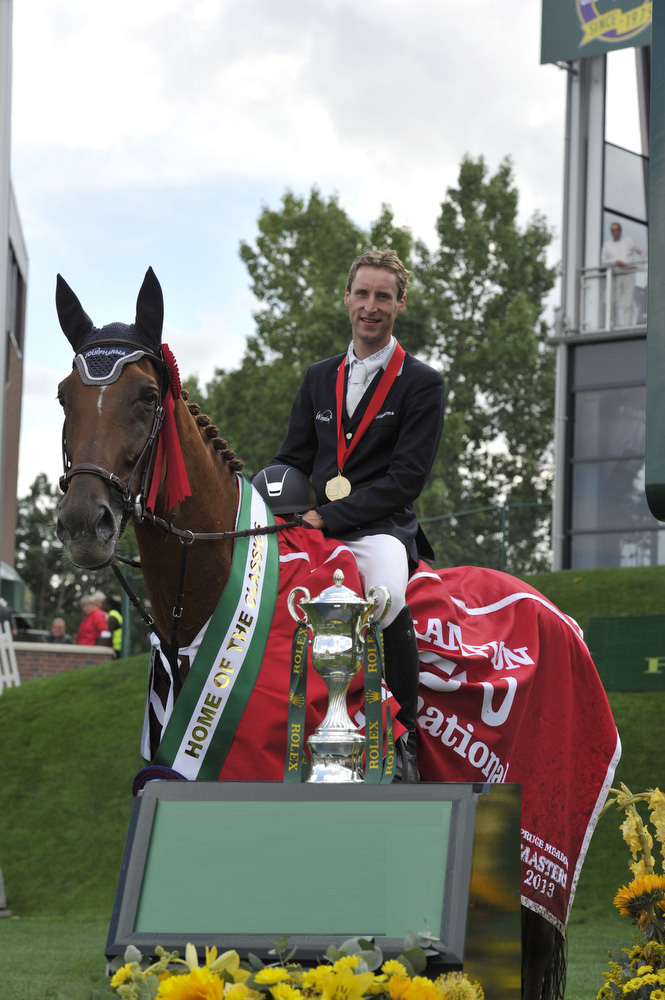
- Devos and Candy after winning the $1 million Grand Prix at Spruce Meadows

Personal information
- Nationality: Belgian
- Discipline: Show Jumping
- Born: 8 February 1986 (age 40)
- Home town: Diest, Belgium

Website
- www.devos-stables.com
Medal record
Representing Belgium
Olympic Games
| Bronze medal – third place | 2020 Tokyo | Team jumping |
World Championships
| Silver medal – second place | 2026 Aachen | Team jumping |
European Championships
| Gold medal – first place | 2025 A Coruña | Team jumping |
| Gold medal – first place | 2019 Rotterdam | Team jumping |
| Bronze medal – third place | 2021 Riesenbeck | Team jumping |

Pieter Devos (born 8 February 1986) is a Belgian show jumping rider from Diest. He is a regular on the Belgian team and has won team gold medals at the 2019 European Championships in Rotterdam (NEL) and 2018 FEI Nations Cup Final in Barcelona (ESP), both on Claire Z. He runs his family's fruit farm and he and his brother share Devos Stables BVBA. He married Caroline Poels in 2015 and the couple have a daughter, Lisa, born in 2017, and a son, Vic, born in 2019.

As of May 2020, Devos is ranked 4th in the FEI World Rankings, his highest ranking to date. At the 2020 Summer Olympics in Tokyo, he was a member of the Belgian team in the team jumping competition which his team, composed of Wathelet and Guery, finished in third place, giving Belgium its first equestrian medal since the 1976 Summer Olympics.

== Early life ==
Devos began riding at the age of five, thanks to the influence of his parents, who were both amateur show jumpers themselves. His first pony was called Moonjump, a tricky pony that he fell off of often, but which also taught him a lot about riding. Through the years, he became very competitive, and began competing internationally in the pony division in 2000. In 2002, Devos was crowned national champion in the ponies with a pony called Côte d'Or.

Throughout his childhood, Devos, alongside his brother, Wouter, was trained by Dirk Demeersman, who is Belgian show jumping Olympian. Devos has said the two are inseparable and that Demeersman is his rock in competition.

After graduating to horses and completing a degree in marketing in 2006, Devos teamed up with Equipharma Tekila D, who he immediately had success with in the young rider division. Devos again picked up a national championship, this time in the young riders with Tekila in 2007.

== Professional career ==
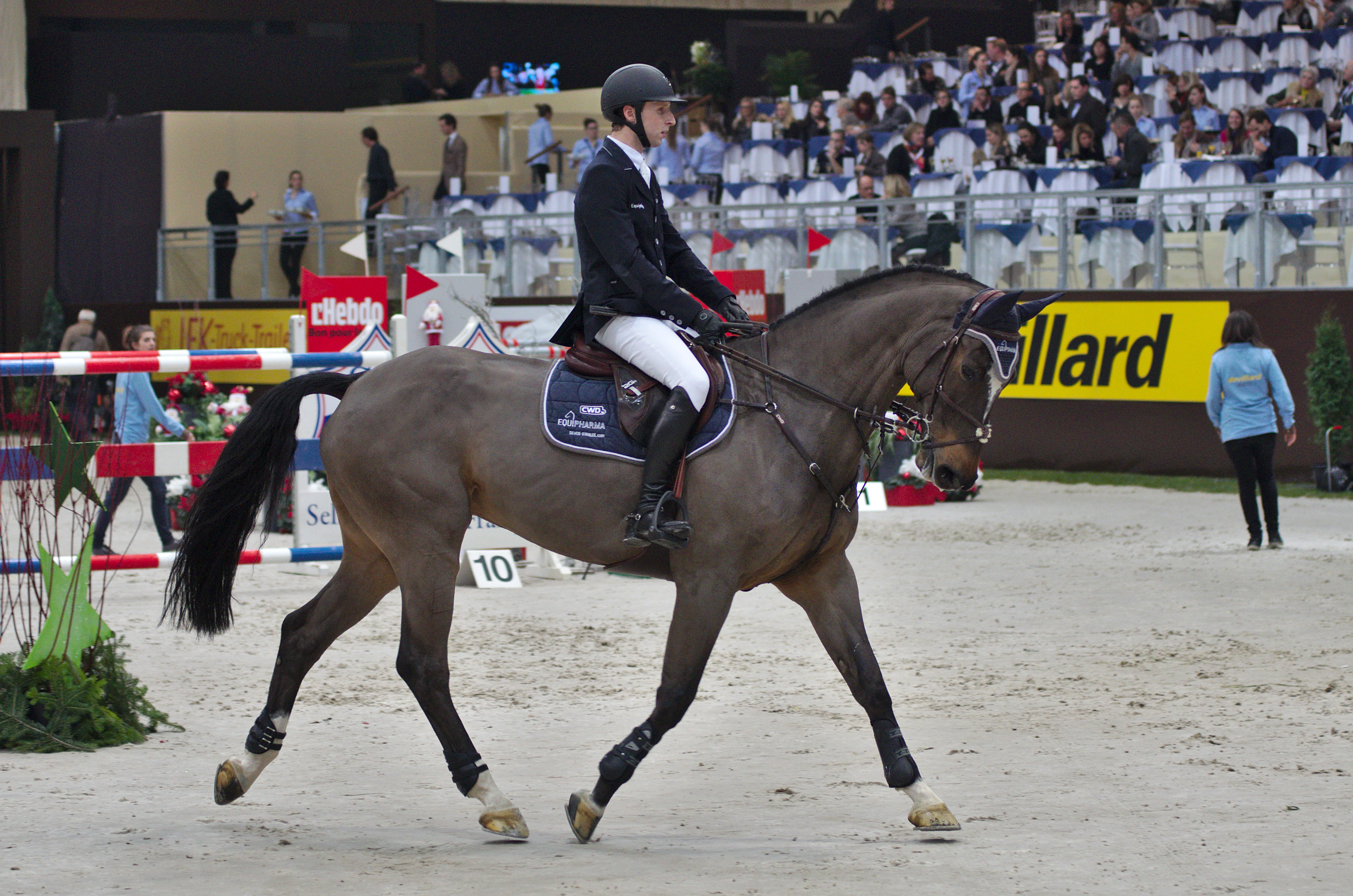
Devos and Dream of India Greenfield at CHI Geneva

With many years of lower-level international competition under his belt, Devos began jumping at the senior level in 2007. Good results in 2008 resulted in his selection to compete at major events such as Hickstead and Dublin. At the end of that year, he was voted Talent of the Year by the Flemish Horse Riding League. Although selected to ride at the 2010 World Equestrian Games in Lexington, KY (USA), Devos' mount for the games, Equipharma Utopia vd Donkhoeve, injured herself in the stables, ending the pair's championship trip early.

Devos had one good horse after another coming into his stable including Dream of India Greenfield, Couscous van Orti, and Dylano in 2012, 2013, and 2014, respectively. Additionally, Devos had Candy, a horse that would shoot him into world recognition by winning the $1 million CN International of Spruce Meadows, a 5* competition that makes up one stop in the world famous Rolex Grand Slam of Show Jumping. In 2014, Devos competed at the World Equestrian Games in Normandy (FRA) with Dream of India Greenfield and the FEI Nations Cup Final in Barcelona (ESP) with Dylano. Dylano and Devos were also selected for the Belgian team at the 2015 European Championships in Rotterdam (NEL), despite having an injury earlier in the year.

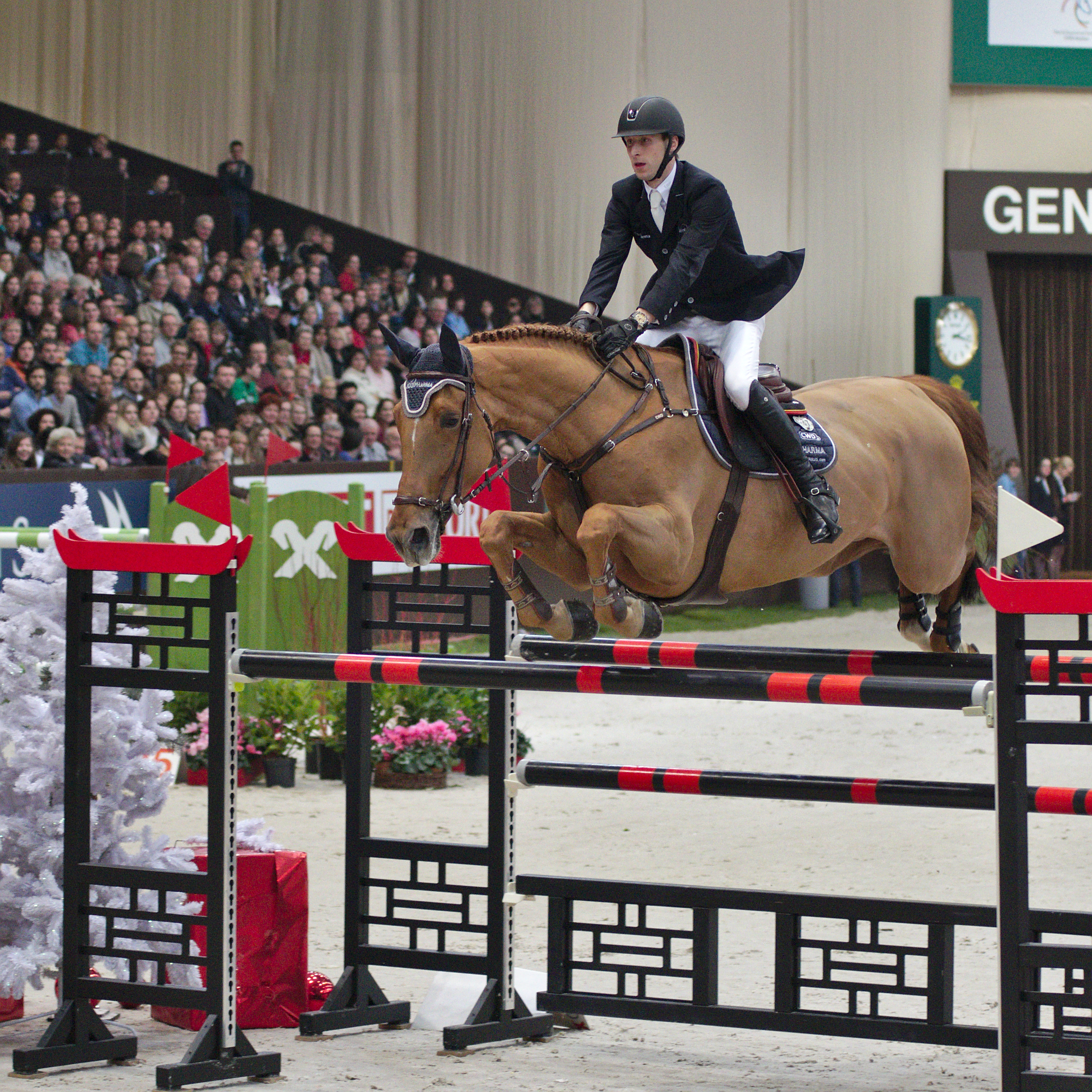
Devos and Candy

In 2017, Devos was once again selected for both the Nations Cup Final team and the European Championships team, both riding Espoir. The team brought home the bronze medal at the Nations Cup Finals and was fourth at the European Championships. He was also fifth individually at the European Championships and won the Longines Cup during the Nations Cup Final with Claire Z. In 2018, Devos jumped at his first FEI World Cup Jumping Finals in Paris (FRA) with Espoir, where the pair finished 9th overall. He and the Belgian team also won the FEI Nations Cup Finals, the first championship that he jumped with Claire Z, his latest superstar.

For Devos, 2019 was particularly successful. He and the Belgian team won gold at the European Championships, once again riding Claire Z to the victory. At the half way point in the Global Champions Tour, Devos was leading the overall ranking, eventually finishing second an collecting more than €750,000 in the season. To date, he has won more than €1.5 million on the Global tour alone.

Devos broke his hand in an unknown manner at the Longines Global Champions Tour of Doha (QAT), one of the last shows to take place before the COVID-19 pandemic disrupted the show season.

As of May 2020, Devos is fourth in the world rankings.

== Major results ==
Major Results for Pieter Devos
| Year | Place | Horse | Event | Rating | Show | Location |
|---|---|---|---|---|---|---|
| 2019 | 1 | Espoir | Stuttgart World Cup Qualifier | CSI5*-W | Stuttgart German Masters | Stuttgart (GER) |
| 2019 | Gold | Claire Z | European Championships | CH-EU | European Championships | Rotterdam (NEL) |
| 2019 | 1 | Jade VD Bisschop | Groupama Masters 1.55m | CSI5* | LGCT of Chantilly | Chantilly (FRA) |
| 2019 | 1 | Jade VD Bisschop | €200,000 SPD Bank 1.55m | CSI5* | LGCT of Shanghai | Shanghai (CHI) |
| 2019 | 1 | Claire Z | LGCT Grand Prix of Miami | CSI5* | LGCT of Miami | Miami, FL (USA) |
| 2019 | 1 | Claire Z | Banorte Trophy 1.55m | CSI5* | LGCT of Mexico City | Mexico City (MEX) |
| 2019 | 1 | Espoir | LGCT Grand Prix of Doha | CSI5* | LGCT of Doha | Doha (QAT) |
| 2018 | 1 | Apart | Stuttgart World Cup Qualifier | CSI5*-W | Stuttgart German Masters | Stuttgart (GER) |
| 2018 | 9 | Espoir | FEI World Cup Jumping Final | WC | World Cup Finals | Paris (FRA) |
| 2018 | 1 | Espoir | Bordeaux World Cup Qualifier | CSI5*-W | Jumping International of Bordeaux | Bordeaux (FRA) |
| 2017 | Gold | Espoir | FEI Nations Cup Final | NC-Final | Nations Cup Final | Barcelona (ESP) |
| 2017 | Gold | Espoir | European Championships | CH-EU | European Championships | Gothenburg (SWE) |
| 2017 | 1 | Apart | Bordeaux World Cup Qualifier | CSI5*-W | Jumping International of Bordeaux | Bordeaux (FRA) |
| 2014 | 1 | Dream of India Greenfield | LGCT Grand Prix of Shanghai | CSI5* | LGCT of Shanghai | Shanghai (CHI) |
| 2013 | 1 | Dream of India Greenfield | Coupe de Geneve | CSI5* | CHI Geneve | Geneva (SUI) |
| 2013 | 1 | Candy | $1 million CN Grand Prix | CSIO5* | Spruce Meadows Masters | Calgary (CAN) |
| 2013 | 1 | Dream of India Greenfield | Budapest World Cup Qualifier | CSI3*-W | Budapest Horse Show | Budapest (HUN) |
