= Jérôme Guery =

Belgian equestrian (born 1980)

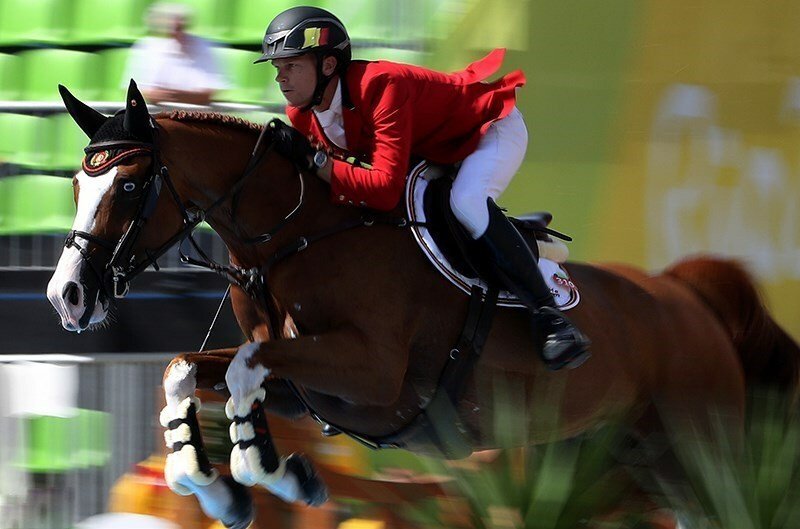
- Guery riding Grand Cru at the 2016 Summer Olympics

Personal information
- Nationality: Belgian
- Born: 24 July 1980 (age 45) Namur, Belgium
- Height: 184 cm (6 ft 0 in)
- Weight: 69 kg (152 lb)
Medal record
Equestrian
Representing Belgium
Olympic Games
| Bronze medal – third place | 2020 Tokyo | Team jumping |
World Championships
| Silver medal – second place | 2022 Herning | Individual jumping |
European Championships
| Gold medal – first place | 2019 Rotterdam | Team jumping |

Jérôme Guery (born 24 July 1980) is a Belgian Olympic show jumping rider. He competed at the 2016 Summer Olympics in Rio de Janeiro, Brazil, where he finished 28th in the individual competition with the horse Grand Cru van de Rozenberg. At the 2020 Summer Olympics in Tokyo, having finished 13th in the Individual jumping, he was a member of the Belgian team in the team jumping competition which his team, composed of Devos and Wathelet, finished in third place, giving Belgium its first equestrian medal since the 1976 Summer Olympics.

== International Championship Results ==
Results
| Year | Event | Horse | Placing | Notes |
|---|---|---|---|---|
| 2010 | World Young Horse Championships | Tic Tac | 16th | 7 Year Olds |
| 2013 | World Young Horse Championships | Boyfriend du Seigneur | 23rd | 6 Year Olds |
| 2014 | World Young Horse Championships | Capo | 4th | 6 Year Olds |
| 2016 | Olympic Games | Grand Cru van de Rozenberg | 28th | Individual |
| 2017 | European Championships | Grand Cru van de Rozenberg | 4th | Team |
| 2017 | European Championships | Grand Cru van de Rozenberg | 11th | Individual |
| 2019 | European Championships | Quel Homme de Hus | 1st place, gold medalist(s) | Team |
| 2019 | European Championships | Quel Homme de Hus | 32nd | Individual |
| 2021 | Olympic Games | Quel Homme de Hus | 3rd place, bronze medalist(s) | Team |
| 2021 | Olympic Games | Quel Homme de Hus | 13th | Individual |
| 2022 | 2022 FEI World Championships | Quel Homme de Hus | 7 | Team |
| 2022 | 2022 FEI World Championships | Quel Homme de Hus | 2nd place, silver medalist(s) | Individual |
EL = Eliminated; RET = Retired; WD = Withdrew
