= Paul Mestdagh =

Belgian volleyball player (born 1947)

Personal information
- Nationality: Belgian
- Born: 3 September 1947 (age 77); Antwerp, Belgium

Sport
- Sport: Volleyball

Paul Mestdagh (born 3 September 1947) is a Belgian volleyball player. He competed in the men's tournament at the 1968 Summer Olympics.
