= Bryan Balsiger =

Swiss equestrian

Personal information
- Full name: Bryan Balsiger
- Nationality: Switzerland
- Born: 2 July 1997 (age 28) Neuchâtel, Switzerland

Sport
- Sport: Equestrian
Medal record
Equestrian
Representing Switzerland
European Championships
Gold medal – first place	2021 Riesenbeck	Team jumping

Bryan Balsiger (born 2 July 1997) is a Swiss equestrian. He competed in the 2020 Summer Olympics.
