= Holly Smith (equestrian) =

British show jumper

Holly Smith (born 14 March 1989) is a show jumper who competes for Great Britain.

Smith was part of the British team at the 2018 FEI World Equestrian Games in Tryon, North Carolina, as well as the bronze medal-winning team at the 2019 FEI European Championships in Rotterdam, both times riding Hearts Destiny or Ted as he was affectionate known before dying in August 2020. Smith has been selected to represent Great Britain at the 2020 Summer Games in Tokyo on her ride Denver.

== Personal life ==
Holly lives in Leicestershire with her husband Graham Smith and their daughter Rosie. She was trained by her ‘horse mad’ mother, Amanda Gillott.
