= Domien Michiels =

Belgian equestrian

Personal information
- Born: 21 September 1983 (age 42) Oud-Heverlee, Belgium

Sport
- Country: Belgium
- Sport: Equestrian
- Event: Dressage

Achievements and titles
- Olympic finals: 2020 Olympic Games

Domien Michiels (born 21 September 1983) is a Belgian dressage rider. Michiels started riding at a young age at the local manège Meerdaalhof in his birthplace Oud-Heverlee. He made his debut on international level in 2016 in Mariakalnok, Hungary. In 2018 he competed for the first time on international Grand Prix level and represented Belgium at the Nations Cup in Geesteren, Netherlands in 2019 and Compiégne, France in 2021.

Michiels represented Belgium at the Olympic Games in Tokyo and in Paris in 2024.
