= Mathieu Billot =

French equestrian

Personal information
- Nationality: French
- Born: 22 December 1985 (age 40) Deauville, France

Sport
- Sport: Equestrian

Mathieu Billot (born 22 December 1985) is a French equestrian. He competed in the individual jumping event at the 2020 Summer Olympics.
