= Philip Mestdagh =

Belgian basketball coach (born 1963)

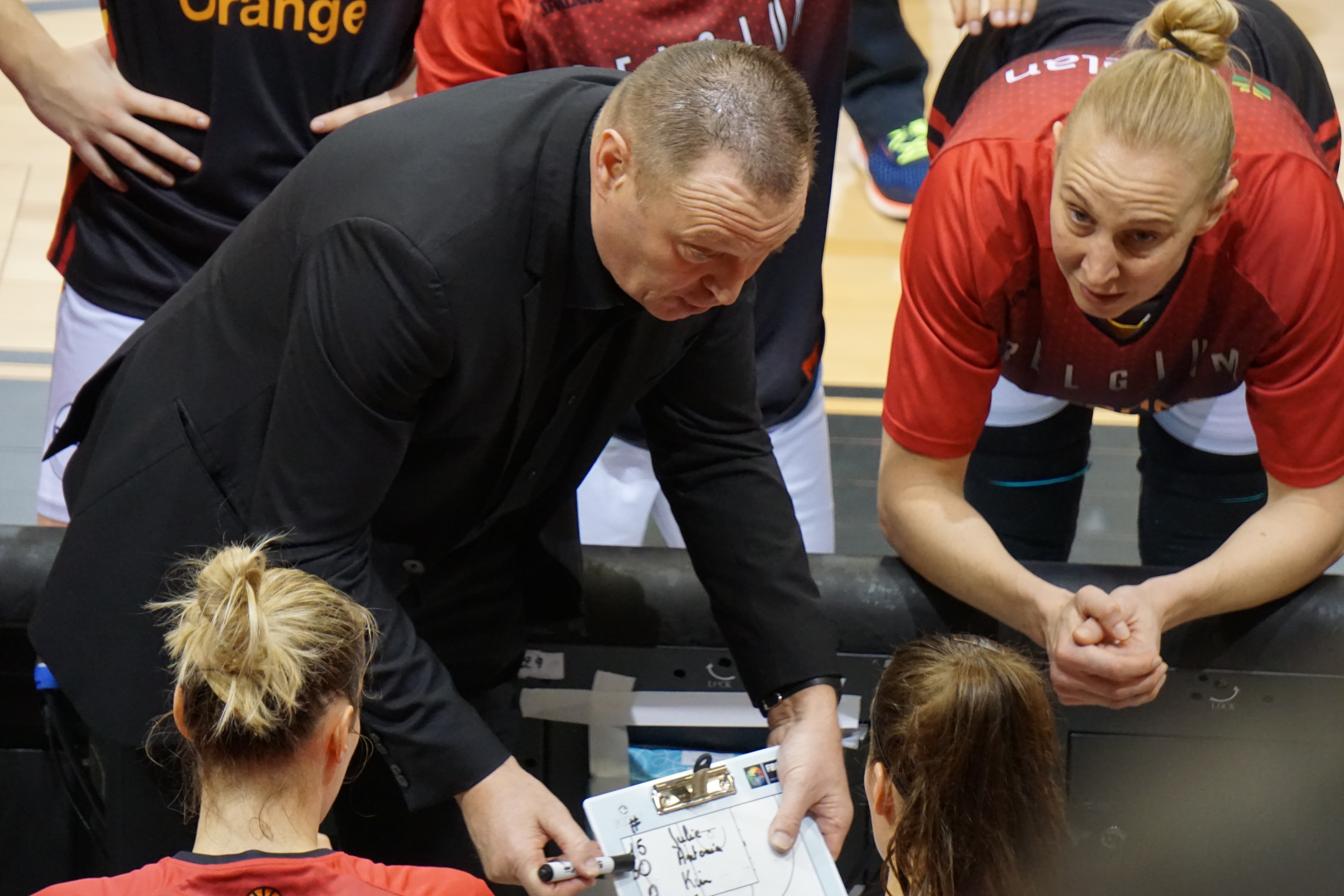
Philip Mestdagh giving his instructions to the Belgian Cats in Ostend

Philip Mestdagh (born 26 January 1963) is a Belgian basketball coach of the Belgian women's national team, which he coached at the EuroBasket Women 2017 and the 2018 FIBA Women's Basketball World Cup. He is the father of Kim and Hanne Mestdagh.
