= Hanne Mestdagh =

Belgian basketball player (born 1993)

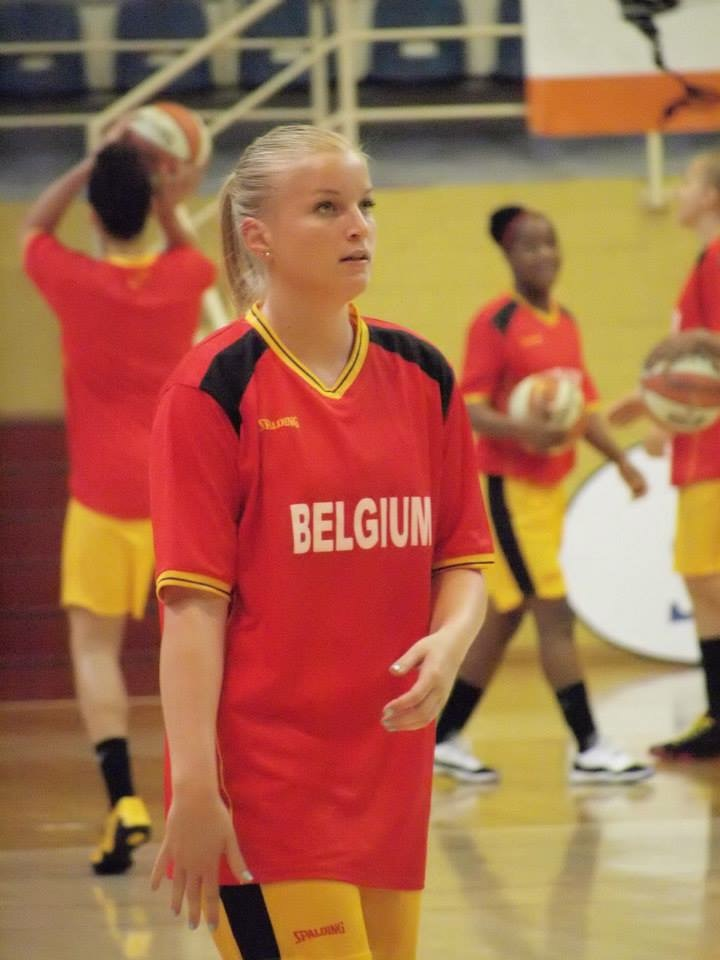

No. 22 – Namur-Capitale
- Position: Small forward
- League: BBL

Personal information
- Born: 19 April 1993 (age 33) Ypres, Belgium
- Listed height: 5 ft 10 in (1.78 m)

Career information
- College: Colorado State
- WNBA draft: 2015: undrafted

Hanne Mestdagh (born 19 April 1993) is a Belgian basketball player for BC Namur-Capitale and the Belgian national team. She is the daughter of Philip Mestdagh and the younger sister of Kim Mestdagh.

She participated at the EuroBasket Women 2017.

== Colorado State statistics ==
Legend
GP	Games played	GS	Games started	MPG	Minutes per game
FG%	Field goal percentage	3P%	3-point field goal percentage	FT%	Free throw percentage
RPG	Rebounds per game	APG	Assists per game	SPG	Steals per game
BPG	Blocks per game	PPG	Points per game	**Bold**	Career high

Year	Team	GP	Points	FG%	3P%	FT%	RPG	APG	SPG	BPG	PPG
2011-12	Colorado State	10	13	**50.0%**	**37.5%**	-	0.5	0.3	0.2	-	1.3
2012-13	Colorado State	Medical redshirt									
2013-14	Colorado State	15	29	28.6%	23.3%	**100.0%**	1.2	0.4	0.3	0.1	1.9
2014-15	Colorado State	**30**	**203**	37.6%	37.0%	80.0%	**2.3**	**0.4**	**0.5**	**0.2**	**6.8**
Career		55	245	36.7%	35.0%	82.4%	1.7	0.4	0.4	0.1	4.5
