= Maurice Tebbel =

German equestrian

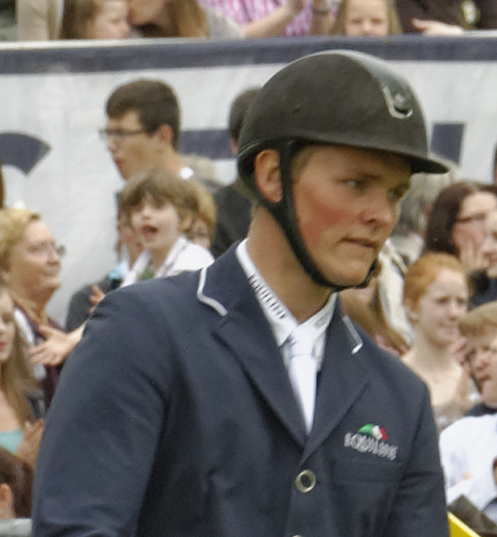
- Internationales Pfingstturnier Wiesbaden 2013

Personal information
- Nationality: Germany
- Born: 23 April 1994 (age 30)

Sport
- Sport: Equestrian

Maurice Tebbel (born 23 April 1994) is a German equestrian. He competed in the 2020 Summer Olympics.
