= Kim Mestdagh =

Belgian basketball player (born 1990)

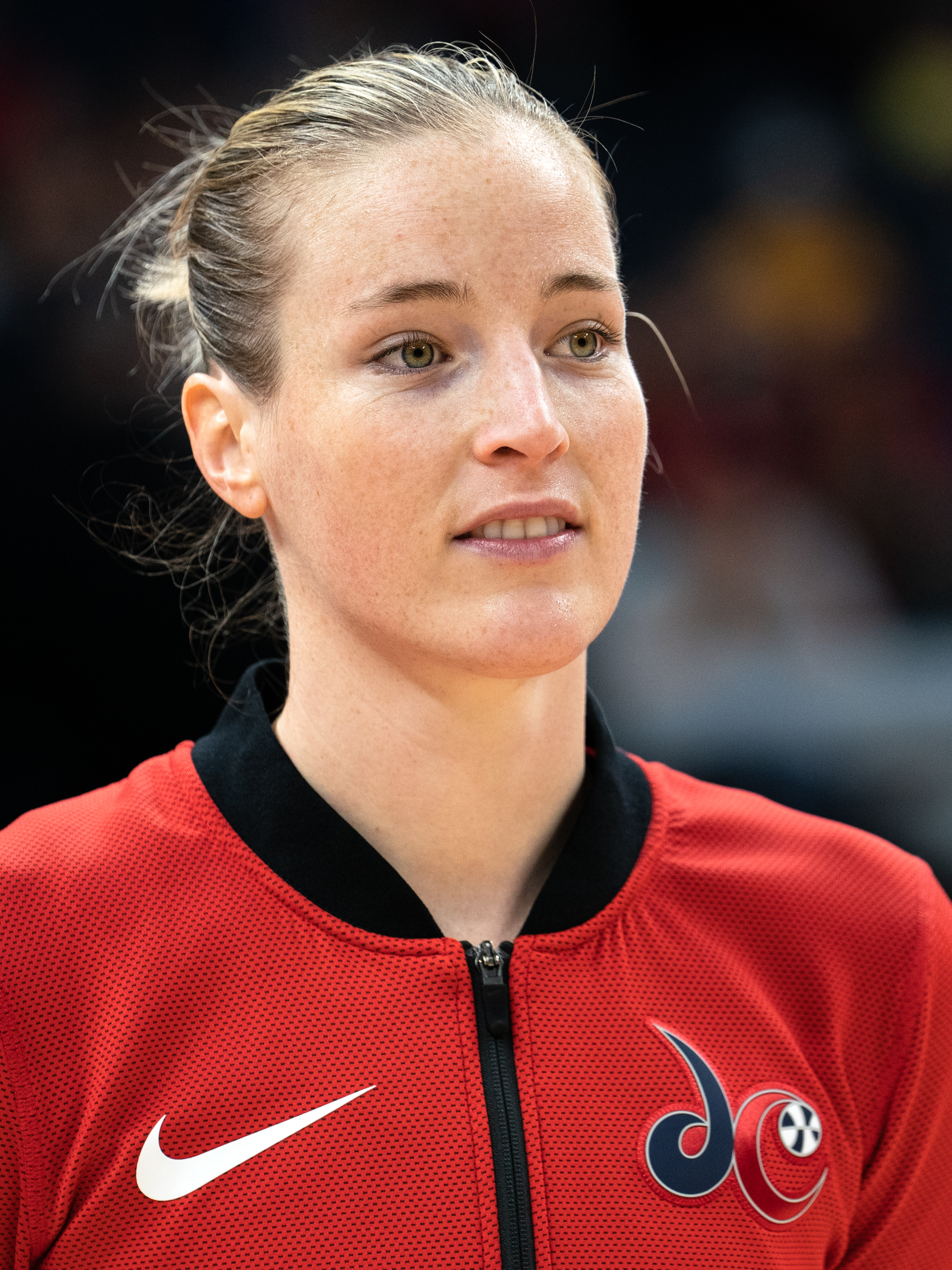
- Mestdagh with Washington Mystics in 2019

Personal information
- Born: 12 March 1990 (age 36) Ypres, Belgium
- Listed height: 5 ft 10 in (1.78 m)

Career information
- College: Colorado State (2008–2012)
- WNBA draft: 2012: undrafted
- Position: Shooting guard

Career history
- 2012–13: CD Zamarat
- 2013–14: Walloon 3 Team
- 2014–15: BC Castors Braine
- 2015–17: Flammes Carolo Basket
- 2017: Yakın Doğu Üniversitesi
- 2017–18: Perfumerías Avenida Baloncesto
- 2018–19: Çukurova Basketbol
- 2019–20: Flammes Carolo Basket
- 2019: Washington Mystics
- 2020–23: Familia Schio
- 2025: Rhodigium
- 2025–: Familia Schio

Career highlights
- 2× Belgian National League champion (2014, 2015); 2× Belgian Cup winner (2014, 2015); Belgian player of the Year (2015); Spanish National League champion (2018); WNBA champion (2019); Eastern Conference (2019); 2× Italian Cup winner (2021, 2022); 2× Italian Super Cup winner (2021, 2022); 2× Italian National League champion (2022, 2023); First-team All-MWC (2012_
- Stats at Basketball Reference

Kim Mestdagh (born 12 March 1990) is a Belgian basketball player for Italian side PF Schio of the Lega Basket Femminile and formerly for the Belgian national team. She is the daughter of Philip Mestdagh and the elder sister of Hanne Mestdagh.

Mestdagh played U.S. college basketball at Colorado State University from 2008 to 2012, finishing her career fourth on the Rams' all-time scoring list.

She played on the Belgian teams which won the bronze medal at EuroBasket Women 2017 and finished in fourth place at the 2018 FIBA Women's Basketball World Cup. She is openly lesbian. Mestdagh is married to Giorgia Sottana and they have a daughter together.

In 2023, she retired from basketball. After the birth of her daughter, she resumed her career in Italy in 2025, aged 34.

== WNBA career statistics ==
Legend
GP	Games played	GS	Games started	MPG	Minutes per game	RPG	Rebounds per game
APG	Assists per game	SPG	Steals per game	BPG	Blocks per game	PPG	Points per game
TO	Turnovers per game	FG%	Field-goal percentage	3P%	3-point field-goal percentage	FT%	Free-throw percentage
**Bold**	Career best	°	League leader

†	Denotes seasons in which Mestdagh won a WNBA championship

=== Regular season ===
Year	Team	GP	GS	MPG	FG%	3P%	FT%	RPG	APG	SPG	BPG	TO	PPG
2019^{†}	Washington	15	0	4.7	.389	.400	1.000	0.3	0.4	0.1	0.0	0.4	1.5
Career	1 year, 1 team	15	0	4.7	.389	.400	1.000	0.3	0.4	0.1	0.0	0.4	1.5

=== Playoffs ===
Year	Team	GP	GS	MPG	FG%	3P%	FT%	RPG	APG	SPG	BPG	TO	PPG
2019^{†}	Washington	1	0	1.0	.000	.000	.000	0.0	0.0	0.0	0.0	0.0	0.0
Career	1 year, 1 team	1	0	1.0	.000	.000	.000	0.0	0.0	0.0	0.0	0.0	0.0

== Colorado State statistics ==
Legend
GP	Games played	GS	Games started	MPG	Minutes per game
FG%	Field goal percentage	3P%	3-point field goal percentage	FT%	Free throw percentage
RPG	Rebounds per game	APG	Assists per game	SPG	Steals per game
BPG	Blocks per game	PPG	Points per game	**Bold**	Career high

Year	Team	GP	Points	FG%	3P%	FT%	RPG	APG	SPG	BPG	PPG
2008-09	Colorado State	**31**	231	39.8%	32.1%	48.0%	3.5	1.3	1.2	**0.4**	7.5
2009-10	Colorado State	30	489	41.7%	37.1%	81.0%	5.4	2.1	2.1	0.2	16.3
2010-11	Colorado State	30	**513**	**43.6%**	**38.0%**	**87.6%**	**5.5**	2.6	1.9	0.1	**17.1**
2011-12	Colorado State	30	443	39.7%	32.7%	83.5%	4.9	**4.0**	**2.6**	0.2	14.8
Career		121	1676	41.4%	139.9%	192.9%	33.0	2.5	1.9	0.2	13.9

== Honours and awards ==
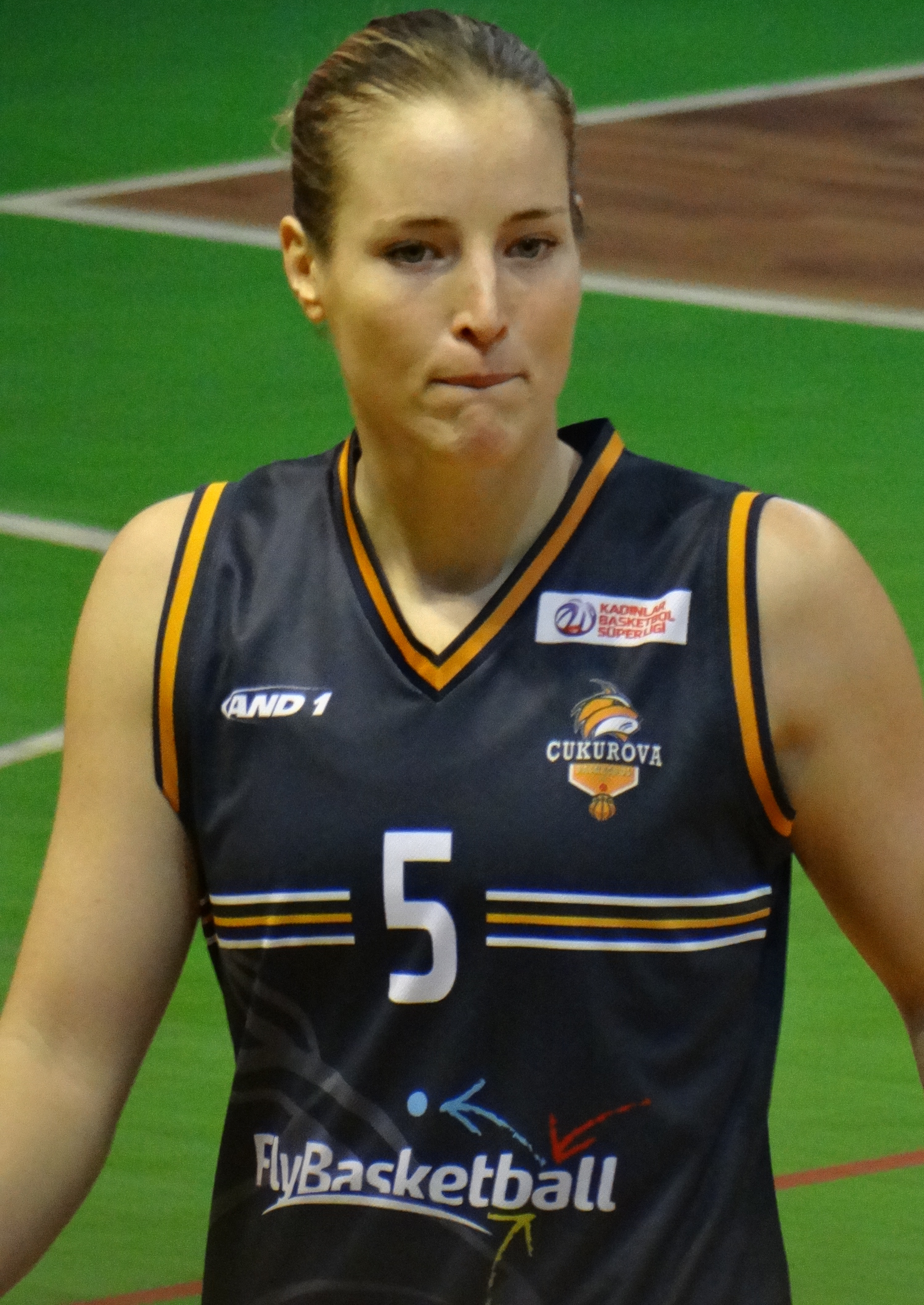
Mestdagh with Çukurova Basketbolin in 2018

=== Team ===
(Belgium) Castors Braine

- Belgian League: 2013–14, 2014–15
- Belgian Cup: 2013–14, 2014–15

(Spain) CB Avenida

- Spanish League: 2017–18

(United States) Washington Mystics

- Eastern Conference champions: 2019
- WNBA champion: 2019

(Italy) Famila Schio

- Italian Cup: 2020–21, 2021–22
- Italian Supercup: 2021, 2022
- Italian League: 2021–22, 2022–23

(Belgium) National Team

- European Championship: (bronze) 2017, 2021
- Belgian Sports Team of the Year: 2020

=== Individual ===
- Mountain West Conference First Team: 2012
- Belgian Top Division Women 1 MVP: 2014–15
