= Russian Olympic Committee athletes at the 2020 Summer Olympics =

ROC at the 2020 Summer Olympics
- IOC code: ROC
- NOC: Russian Olympic Committee

in Tokyo, Japan July 23, 2021 – August 8, 2021
- Competitors: 335 in 30 sports
- Flag bearers (opening): Sofya Velikaya; Maxim Mikhaylov
- Flag bearer (closing): Abdulrashid Sadulaev
- Medals Ranked 5th: Gold 20 Silver 28 Bronze 23 Total 71

Summer Olympics appearances (overview)
- 2020

Other related appearances
- Russian Empire (1900–1912); Soviet Union (1952–1988); Unified Team (1992); Russia (1994–2016); Individual Neutral Athletes (2024)

Prior to the 2019 decision by the World Anti-Doping Agency (WADA), the Russian Federation was expected to compete at the 2020 Summer Olympics in Tokyo, which took place from 23 July to 8 August 2021 because of the COVID-19 pandemic. It would have been the country's seventh consecutive appearance at the Summer Olympics as an independent nation; however, their athletes were entered and represented under the "Russian Olympic Committee" using the acronym "ROC" due to the consequences of the doping scandal in the country. The team finished fifth in the medal standings with 20 gold and 71 total medals, winning 1 gold medal and 15 total medal more than five years prior. The Soviet Union/Unified Team/Russia/ROC never finished below fifth since they started competing in 1952. This was ROC' first and only appearance at the Summer Olympics as Belarus along with Russia was barred from competing at the 2024 Summer Olympics in Paris as a result of the ongoing Russian invasion of Ukraine.

This was the outcome of a decision by the World Anti-Doping Agency (WADA) on 9 December 2019, banning Russia from all international sport for four years, after it had been found that data provided by the Russian Anti-Doping Agency had been manipulated by Russian authorities with a goal of protecting athletes involved in its state-sponsored doping scheme. As at the 2018 Winter Olympics, WADA would allow individual cleared Russian athletes to compete neutrally under a title to be determined (which may not include the name "Russia", unlike the use of "Olympic Athletes from Russia" in 2018).

Russia later filed an appeal to the Court of Arbitration for Sport (CAS) against the WADA decision. The Court of Arbitration for Sport, on review of Russia's appeal of its case from WADA, ruled on 17 December 2020 to reduce the penalty that WADA had placed. Instead of banning Russia from sporting events, the ruling allowed Russia to participate at the Olympics and other international events, but for a period of two years, the team cannot use the Russian name, flag, or anthem and must present themselves as "Neutral Athlete" or "Neutral Team". The ruling does allow for team uniforms to display "Russia" on the uniform as well as the use of the Russian flag colors within the uniform's design, although the name should be up to equal predominance as the "Neutral Athlete/Team" designation. Russia can appeal the decision.

On 19 February 2021, it was announced that Russia would compete under the acronym "ROC", after the name of the Russian Olympic Committee. On aftermatch, the IOC announced that the Russian national flag would be substituted by the flag of the Russian Olympic Committee. It would also be allowed to use team uniforms featuring the logo of the Russian Olympic Committee, or the acronym "ROC" would be added.

On 15 April 2021, the uniforms for the Russian Olympic Committee athletes were unveiled, featuring the colours of the Russian flag. On 22 April 2021, the replacement for Russia's anthem was approved by the IOC, after an earlier choice of the patriotic Russian war song "Katyusha" was rejected. A fragment of Pyotr Tchaikovsky's Piano Concerto No. 1 is used.

On 23 July 2021, the Russian Olympic Committee athletes appeared at the opening ceremony of the 2020 Summer Olympics. To place the team into the parade of nations, "ROC" was transliterated into Japanese from its French abbreviation, COR (comité olympique russe), whose initials are pronounced shī ō āru; based on this, the team was sorted using gojūon order into 77th place in the parade. Representatives of the Russian Olympic Committee did not have Japanese transcription on the back of their nametag, which was carried in front. Channel 1, which was broadcasting the ceremonies, attributed this to the inability to display the name "ROC" in Japanese characters.

The opening ceremony flag-bearers for the ROC were fencer Sofya Velikaya and volleyball player Maxim Mikhaylov. Wrestler Abdulrashid Sadulaev was the flag-bearer for the closing ceremony.

== Medalists ==
Medal	Name	Sport	Event	Date
Gold	Vitalina Batsarashkina	Shooting	Women's 10 m air pistol	25 July
Gold	Sofia Pozdniakova	Fencing	Women's sabre	26 July
Gold	Denis Ablyazin; David Belyavskiy; Artur Dalaloyan; Nikita Nagornyy	Gymnastics	Men's artistic team all-around	26 July
Gold	Maksim Khramtsov	Taekwondo	Men's 80 kg	26 July
Gold	Evgeny Rylov	Swimming	Men's 100 m backstroke	27 July
Gold	Lilia Akhaimova; Viktoria Listunova; Angelina Melnikova; Vladislava Urazova	Gymnastics	Women's artistic team all-around	27 July
Gold	Vladislav Larin	Taekwondo	Men's +80 kg	27 July
Gold	Inna Deriglazova; Larisa Korobeynikova; Marta Martyanova; Adelina Zagidullina	Fencing	Women's team foil	29 July
Gold	Evgeny Rylov	Swimming	Men's 200 m backstroke	30 July
Gold	Vitalina Batsarashkina	Shooting	Women's 25 m pistol	30 July
Gold	Olga Nikitina; Sofia Pozdniakova; Sofya Velikaya	Fencing	Women's team sabre	31 July
Gold	Andrey Rublev; Anastasia Pavlyuchenkova	Tennis	Mixed doubles	1 August
Gold	Musa Evloev	Wrestling	Men's Greco-Roman 97 kg	3 August
Gold	Svetlana Kolesnichenko; Svetlana Romashina	Artistic swimming	Women's duet	4 August
Gold	Albert Batyrgaziev	Boxing	Men's featherweight	5 August
Gold	Zaur Uguev	Wrestling	Men's freestyle 57 kg	5 August
Gold	Zaurbek Sidakov	Wrestling	Men's freestyle 74 kg	6 August
Gold	Vlada Chigireva; Marina Goliadkina; Svetlana Kolesnichenko; Polina Komar; Alexandra Patskevich; Svetlana Romashina; Alla Shishkina; Maria Shurochkina	Artistic swimming	Women's team	7 August
Gold	Abdulrashid Sadulaev	Wrestling	Men's freestyle 97 kg	7 August
Gold	Mariya Lasitskene	Athletics	Women's high jump	7 August
Silver	Anastasiia Galashina	Shooting	Women's 10 m air rifle	24 July
Silver	Svetlana Gomboeva; Elena Osipova; Ksenia Perova	Archery	Women's team	25 July
Silver	Inna Deriglazova	Fencing	Women's foil	25 July
Silver	Tatiana Minina	Taekwondo	Women's 57 kg	25 July
Silver	Sofya Velikaya	Fencing	Women's sabre	26 July
Silver	Kliment Kolesnikov	Swimming	Men's 100 m backstroke	27 July
Silver	Vitalina Batsarashkina; Artem Chernousov	Shooting	Mixed 10 m air pistol team	27 July
Silver	Mikhail Dovgalyuk; Ivan Girev; Aleksandr Krasnykh^{[a]} Martin Malyutin; Evgeny Rylov; Mikhail Vekovishchev^{[a]}	Swimming	Men's 4 × 200 m freestyle relay	28 July
Silver	Evgeniia Frolkina; Olga Frolkina; Yulia Kozik; Anastasia Logunova	Basketball	Women's 3x3 tournament	28 July
Silver	Ilia Karpenkov; Kirill Pisklov; Stanislav Sharov; Alexander Zuev	Basketball	Men's 3x3 tournament	28 July
Silver	Vasilisa Stepanova; Elena Oriabinskaia	Rowing	Women's coxless pair	29 July
Silver	Hanna Prakatsen	Rowing	Women's single sculls	30 July
Silver	Elena Osipova	Archery	Women's individual	30 July
Silver	Sergey Bida; Nikita Glazkov; Sergey Khodos; Pavel Sukhov	Fencing	Men's team épée	30 July
Silver	Yulia Zykova	Shooting	Women's 50 m rifle three positions	31 July
Silver	Karen Khachanov	Tennis	Men's singles	1 August
Silver	Anastasia Iliankova	Gymnastics	Women's uneven bars	1 August
Silver	Anton Borodachev; Kirill Borodachev; Vladislav Mylnikov; Timur Safin	Fencing	Men's team foil	1 August
Silver	Aslan Karatsev; Elena Vesnina	Tennis	Mixed doubles	1 August
Silver	Sergey Kamenskiy	Shooting	Men's 50 m rifle three positions	2 August
Silver	Denis Ablyazin	Gymnastics	Men's vault	2 August
Silver	Anzhelika Sidorova	Athletics	Women's pole vault	5 August
Silver	Muslim Gadzhimagomedov	Boxing	Men's heavyweight	6 August
Silver	Viacheslav Krasilnikov; Oleg Stoyanovskiy	Volleyball	Men's beach	7 August
Silver	Dina Averina	Gymnastics	Women's rhythmic individual all-around	7 August
Silver	ROC men's volleyball team: Denis Bogdan; Valentin Golubev; Ivan Iakovlev; Egor Kliuka; Igor Kobzar; Ilyas Kurkaev; Maksim Mikhaylov; Pavel Pankov; Yaroslav Podlesnykh; Viktor Poletaev; Dmitry Volkov; Artem Volvich	Volleyball	Men's tournament	7 August
Silver	Anastasia Bliznyuk; Anastasia Maksimova; Angelina Shkatova; Anastasia Tatareva; Alisa Tishchenko	Gymnastics	Women's rhythmic group all-around	8 August
Silver	ROC women's handball team: Vladlena Bobrovnikova; Daria Dmitrieva; Olga Fomina; Polina Gorshkova; Ekaterina Ilina; Victoriya Kalinina; Polina Kuznetsova; Kseniya Makeyeva; Yulia Managarova; Elena Mikhaylichenko; Anna Sedoykina; Anna Sen; Antonina Skorobogatchenko; Anna Vyakhireva; Polina Vedekhina	Handball	Women's tournament	8 August
Bronze	Mikhail Artamonov	Taekwondo	Men's 58 kg	24 July
Bronze	Larisa Korobeynikova	Fencing	Women's foil	25 July
Bronze	Aleksandr Bondar; Viktor Minibaev	Diving	Men's synchronized 10 m platform	26 July
Bronze	Yulia Karimova; Sergey Kamenskiy	Shooting	Mixed 10 m air rifle team	27 July
Bronze	Madina Taimazova	Judo	Women's 70 kg	28 July
Bronze	Nikita Nagornyy	Gymnastics	Men's artistic individual all-around	28 July
Bronze	Kliment Kolesnikov	Swimming	Men's 100 m freestyle	29 July
Bronze	Niyaz Ilyasov	Judo	Men's 100 kg	29 July
Bronze	Angelina Melnikova	Gymnastics	Women's artistic individual all-around	29 July
Bronze	Tamerlan Bashaev	Judo	Men's +100 kg	30 July
Bronze	Yulia Karimova	Shooting	Women's 50 m rifle three positions	31 July
Bronze	Imam Khataev	Boxing	Men's light heavyweight	1 August
Bronze	Andrey Zamkovoy	Boxing	Men's welterweight	1 August
Bronze	Daria Shmeleva; Anastasia Voynova	Cycling	Women's team sprint	2 August
Bronze	Angelina Melnikova	Gymnastics	Women's floor	2 August
Bronze	Sergey Emelin	Wrestling	Men's Greco-Roman 60 kg	2 August
Bronze	Sergey Semenov	Wrestling	Men's Greco-Roman 130 kg	2 August
Bronze	Nikita Nagornyy	Gymnastics	Men's horizontal bar	3 August
Bronze	Gleb Bakshi	Boxing	Men's middleweight	5 August
Bronze	Artur Naifonov	Wrestling	Men's freestyle 86 kg	5 August
Bronze	Zemfira Magomedalieva	Boxing	Women's middleweight	6 August
Bronze	Gulnaz Khatuntseva; Maria Novolodskaya	Cycling	Women's madison	6 August
Bronze	Gadzhimurad Rashidov	Wrestling	Men's freestyle 65 kg	7 August

Medals by sport
Sport	1st place, gold medalist(s)	2nd place, silver medalist(s)	3rd place, bronze medalist(s)	Total
Archery	0	2	0	2
Artistic swimming	2	0	0	2
Athletics	1	1	0	2
Basketball	0	2	0	2
Boxing	1	1	4	6
Cycling	0	0	2	2
Diving	0	0	1	1
Fencing	3	4	1	8
Gymnastics	2	4	4	10
Handball	0	1	0	1
Judo	0	0	3	3
Rowing	0	2	0	2
Shooting	2	4	2	8
Swimming	2	2	1	5
Taekwondo	2	1	1	4
Tennis	1	2	0	3
Volleyball	0	2	0	2
Wrestling	4	0	4	8
Total	20	28	23	71

Medals by date
Day	Date	1st place, gold medalist(s)	2nd place, silver medalist(s)	3rd place, bronze medalist(s)	Total
1	July 24	0	1	1	2
2	July 25	1	3	1	5
3	July 26	3	1	1	5
4	July 27	3	2	1	6
5	July 28	0	3	2	5
6	July 29	1	1	3	5
7	July 30	2	3	1	6
8	July 31	1	1	1	3
9	August 1	1	4	2	7
10	August 2	0	2	4	6
11	August 3	1	0	1	2
12	August 4	1	0	0	1
13	August 5	2	1	2	5
14	August 6	1	1	2	4
15	August 7	3	3	1	7
16	August 8	0	2	0	2
Total		20	28	23	71

Medals by gender
Gender	1st place, gold medalist(s)	2nd place, silver medalist(s)	3rd place, bronze medalist(s)	Total	Percentage
Female	9	15	8	32	45.1%
Male	10	11	14	35	49.3%
Mixed	1	2	1	4	5.6%
Total	20	28	23	71	100%

== Competitors ==
The following is the list of number of competitors participating in the Games:

Sport	Men	Women	Total
Archery	1	3	4
Artistic swimming	—	8	8
Athletics	6	4	10
Badminton	3	1	4
Basketball	4	4	8
Boxing	7	4	11
Canoeing	9	8	17
Cycling	9	9	18
Diving	4	3	7
Equestrian	2	3	5
Fencing	12	11	23
Gymnastics	8	15	23
Handball	0	14	14
Judo	7	6	13
Karate	0	1	1
Modern pentathlon	1	2	3
Rowing	3	7	10
Rugby sevens	0	12	12
Sailing	4	2	6
Shooting	8	9	17
Sport climbing	1	2	3
Swimming	21	15	36
Table tennis	1	2	3
Taekwondo	3	1	4
Tennis	4	4	8
Triathlon	2	2	4
Volleyball	16	14	30
Water polo	0	12	12
Weightlifting	1	1	2
Wrestling	11	6	17
Total	148	185	333

== Archery ==
Three Russian archers qualified for the women's events by reaching the quarterfinal stage of the women's team recurve at the 2019 World Archery Championships in 's-Hertogenbosch, Netherlands.

Athlete	Event	Ranking round		Round of 64	Round of 32	Round of 16	Quarterfinals	Semifinals	Final / BM	
Athlete	Event	Score	Seed	Opposition Score	Opposition Score	Opposition Score	Opposition Score	Opposition Score	Opposition Score	Rank
Galsan Bazarzhapov	Men's individual	653	34	Jadhav (IND); L 0–6	Did not advance					
Svetlana Gomboeva	Women's individual	630	45	Schloesser (NED); L 5–6	Did not advance					
Elena Osipova	Women's individual	651	22	Mashayikh (MAS); W 6–4	Kroppen (GER); W 6–4	Pitman (GBR); W 6–0	Kang C-y (KOR); W 7–1	Boari (ITA); W 6–0	An S (KOR); L 5–6	2nd place, silver medalist(s)
Ksenia Perova	Women's individual	664	8	Ingley (AUS); W 7–1	Jager (DEN); W 7–3	Kumari (IND); L 5–6	Did not advance			
Svetlana Gomboeva; Elena Osipova; Ksenia Perova	Women's team	1945	6	—N/a		Ukraine; W 6–2	United States; W 6–0	Germany; W 5–1	South Korea; L 0–6	2nd place, silver medalist(s)
Galsan Bazarzhapov; Ksenia Perova	Mixed team	1317	10 Q	—N/a		Turkey; L 2–6	Did not advance			

== Artistic swimming ==
ROC fielded a squad of eight artistic swimmers to compete in the women's duet and team events, by winning the 2019 LEN European Champions Cup.

Athlete	Event	Free routine (preliminary)		Technical routine			Free routine (final)		
Athlete	Event	Points	Rank	Points	Total (technical + free(pre))	Rank	Points	Total (technical + free)	Rank
Svetlana Kolesnichenko; Svetlana Romashina	Duet	97.9000	1	97.1079	195.0079	1 Q	98.8000	195.9079	1st place, gold medalist(s)
Vlada Chigireva; Marina Goliadkina; Svetlana Kolesnichenko; Polina Komar; Alexandra Patskevich; Svetlana Romashina; Alla Shishkina; Maria Shurochkina	Team	—N/a		97.2979	—N/a	1	98.8000	196.0979	1st place, gold medalist(s)

== Athletics ==
No more than 10 Authorised Neutral Athletes will be granted by World Athletics to the Russian Olympic Committee. On 1 May 2021, only four Russian athletes were granted this status. On 22 May 2021, 23 Russian athletes were granted this status. On 27 June 2021, 123 Russian athletes were granted this status.

Key

- Note–Ranks given for track events are within the athlete's heat only
- Q = Qualified for the next round
- q = Qualified for the next round as a fastest loser or, in field events, by position without achieving the qualifying target
- NR = National record
- N/A = Round not applicable for the event
- Bye = Athlete not required to compete in round

Track & road events

Athlete	Event	Heat		Semifinal		Final	
Athlete	Event	Time	Rank	Time	Rank	Time	Rank
Sergey Shubenkov	Men's 110 m hurdles	DNS		Did not advance			
Vasiliy Mizinov	Men's 20 km walk	—N/a				DSQ	
Elvira Khasanova	Women's 20 km walk	—N/a				1:31:58	16

Field events

Athlete	Event	Qualification		Final	
Athlete	Event	Distance	Position	Distance	Position
Mikhail Akimenko	Men's high jump	2.28	1 q	2.33 =SB	6
Ilya Ivanyuk	Men's high jump	2.28	6 q	2.30	9
Valeriy Pronkin	Men's hammer throw	75.80	11 q	76.72	8
Darya Klishina	Women's long jump	NM	—	Did not advance	
Mariya Lasitskene	Women's high jump	1.95	9 Q	2.04	1st place, gold medalist(s)
Anzhelika Sidorova	Women's pole vault	4.55	1 q	4.85	2nd place, silver medalist(s)

Combined events – Men's decathlon

Athlete	Event	100 m	LJ	SP	HJ	400 m	110H	DT	PV	JT	1500 m	Final	Rank
Ilya Shkurenyov	Result	10.93	7.59	14.95	1.99	48.98	14.43	47.02	5.10	60.95	4:34.62	8413	8
Ilya Shkurenyov	Points	876	957	787	794	862	920	809	941	752	715	8413	8

== Badminton ==
Four Russian badminton players have been entered in the following events into the Olympic tournament based on the BWF Race to Tokyo Rankings.

Athlete	Event	Group stage				Elimination	Quarterfinal	Semifinal	Final / BM	
Athlete	Event	Opposition Score	Opposition Score	Opposition Score	Rank	Opposition Score	Opposition Score	Opposition Score	Opposition Score	Rank
Sergey Sirant	Men's singles	Krausz (HUN); W (21–18, 21–18)	Ginting (INA); L (12–21, 10–21)	—N/a	2	Did not advance				
Evgeniya Kosetskaya	Women's singles	Li (GER); W (22–20, 21–15)	Okuhara (JPN); L (6–21, 16–21)	—N/a	2	Did not advance				
Vladimir Ivanov; Ivan Sozonov	Men's doubles	Astrup / Rasmussen (DEN); L (13–21, 18–21)	Endo / Watanabe (JPN); L (19–21, 19–21)	Olofua / Opeyori (NGR); W (21–8, 21–10)	3	—N/a	Did not advance			

== Basketball ==
=== 3×3 basketball ===
Summary

Team	Event	Group stage								Quarterfinal	Semifinal	Final / BM	
Team	Event	Opposition Score	Opposition Score	Opposition Score	Opposition Score	Opposition Score	Opposition Score	Opposition Score	Rank	Opposition Score	Opposition Score	Opposition Score	Rank
ROC men's 3×3	Men's 3×3 tournament	China; W 21–13	Netherlands; L 15–18	Belgium; L 16–19	Poland; L 16–21	Japan; W 19–16	Latvia; W 19–15	Serbia; L 10–21	5 QQ	Netherlands; W 21–19	Serbia; W 21–10	Latvia; L 18–21	2nd place, silver medalist(s)
ROC women's 3×3	Women's 3×3 tournament	Japan; W 21–18	China; W 19–9	Mongolia; W 21–5	United States; L 16–20	Romania; W 21–12	France; L 14–17	Italy; W 17–9	2 QS	Bye	China; W 21–14	United States; L 15–18	2nd place, silver medalist(s)

==== Men's tournament ====
Russia men's national 3x3 team qualified directly for the Olympics by securing an outright berth, as one of the three highest-ranked squads, in the men's category of the FIBA rankings.

Team roster

- Ilia Karpenkov
- Kirill Pisklov
- Stanislav Sharov
- Alexander Zuev

Group play

Pos	Team	Pld	W	L	PF	PA	PD	Qualification
1	Serbia	7	7	0	138	91	+47	Semifinals
2	Belgium	7	4 (Note: Belgium 2–0, Latvia 1–1, Netherlands 0–2)	3	126	127	−1	Semifinals
3	Latvia	7	4	3	133	129	+4	Quarterfinals
4	Netherlands	7	4	3	132	129	+3	Quarterfinals
5	ROC	7	3	4	116	125	−9	Quarterfinals
6	Japan (H)	7	2 (Note: Japan 1–1, 123 PS; Poland 1–1, 120 PS; China 1–1, 119 PS)	5	123	134	−11	Quarterfinals
7	Poland	7	2	5	120	130	−10	
8	China	7	2	5	119	142	−23	

Source: TOCOG and FIBA
Rules for classification: 1) Wins; 2) Head-to-head record; 3) Points scored.
(H) Hosts
Notes:

24 July 2021
15:00
v

Report

ROC	21–13	China
Pts: Zuev 12		Pts: Hu 6

Aomi Urban Sports Park, Tokyo
Referees: Glenn Tuitt (USA), Cecília Tóth (HUN)

24 July 2021
22:00
v

Report

Netherlands	18–15	ROC
Pts: Van der Horst 9		Pts: Karpenkov 6

Aomi Urban Sports Park, Tokyo
Referees: Jasmina Juras (SRB), Markos Michaelides (SUI)

25 July 2021
11:35
v

Report

ROC	16–21	Belgium
Pts: Karpenkov 7		Pts: Celis, Vervoort 7

Aomi Urban Sports Park, Tokyo
Referees: Vlad Ghizdareanu (ROU), Cecília Tóth (HUN)

25 July 2021
18:40
v

Report

ROC	16–21	Poland
Pts: Pisklov 6		Pts: Pawłowski 8

Aomi Urban Sports Park, Tokyo
Referees: Edmond Ho (HKG), Jasmina Juras (SRB)

26 July 2021
15:00
v

Report

Japan	16–19	ROC
Pts: Brown 7		Pts: Pisklov 7

Aomi Urban Sports Park, Tokyo
Referees: Glenn Tuitt (USA), Cecília Tóth (HUN)

26 July 2021
22:00
v

Report

ROC	19–15	Latvia
Pts: Zuev 7		Pts: Lasmanis 6

Aomi Urban Sports Park, Tokyo
Referees: Vlad Ghizdareanu (ROU), Jasmina Juras (SRB)

27 July 2021
18:00
v

Report

Serbia	21–10	ROC
Pts: Vasić 8		Pts: Karpenkov 5

Aomi Urban Sports Park, Tokyo
Referees: Markos Michaelides (SUI), Cecília Tóth (HUN)

Quarterfinal

27 July 2021
21:00
v

Report

Netherlands	19–21	ROC
Pts: Van der Horst 8		Pts: Zuev 9

Aomi Urban Sports Park, Tokyo
Referees: Edmond Ho (HKG), Markos Michaelides (SUI)

Semifinal

28 July 2021
17:30
v

Report

Serbia	10–21	ROC
Pts: Domović Bulut 5		Pts: Zuev 11

Aomi Urban Sports Park, Tokyo
Referees: Marek Maliszewski (POL), Markos Michaelides (SUI)

Gold medal match

28 July 2021
22:25
v

Report

ROC	18–21	Latvia
Pts: Karpenkov 7		Pts: Lasmanis 10

Aomi Urban Sports Park, Tokyo
Referees: Jasmina Juras (SRB), Markos Michaelides (SUI)

==== Women's tournament ====
Russia women's national 3x3 team qualified directly for the Olympics by securing an outright berth, as one of the four highest-ranked squads, in the women's category of the FIBA rankings.

Team roster

- Evgeniia Frolkina
- Olga Frolkina
- Yulia Kozik
- Anastasia Logunova

Group play

Pos	Team	Pld	W	L	PF	PA	PD	Qualification
1	United States	7	6	1	136	98	+38	Semifinals
2	ROC	7	5 (Note: ROC 2–0, China 1–1, Japan 0–2)	2	129	90	+39	Semifinals
3	China	7	5	2	127	97	+30	Quarterfinals
4	Japan (H)	7	5	2	130	97	+33	Quarterfinals
5	France	7	4	3	118	116	+2	Quarterfinals
6	Italy	7	2	5	98	125	−27	Quarterfinals
7	Romania	7	1	6	89	142	−53	
8	Mongolia	7	0	7	79	141	−62	

Source: TOCOG and FIBA
Rules for classification: 1) Wins; 2) Head-to-head record; 3) Points scored.
(H) Hosts
Notes:

24 July 2021
10:15
v

Report

ROC	21–18	Japan
Pts: O. Frolkina 7		Pts: Shinozaki 8

Aomi Urban Sports Park, Tokyo
Referees: Edmond Ho (HKG), Cecília Tóth (HUN)

24 July 2021
14:00
v

Report

ROC	19–9	China
Pts: O. Frolkina 7		Pts: Wan J 4

Aomi Urban Sports Park, Tokyo
Referees: Vanessa Devlin (AUS), Cecília Tóth (HUN)

25 July 2021
14:00
v

Report

Mongolia	5–21	ROC
Pts: Tserenlkham 3		Pts: Kozik, O. Frolkina 8

Aomi Urban Sports Park, Tokyo
Referees: Su Yu-yen (TPE), Vlad Ghizdareanu (ROU)

25 July 2021
21:25
v

Report

ROC	16–20	United States
Pts: Kozik 8		Pts: Gray 8

Aomi Urban Sports Park, Tokyo
Referees: Jasmina Juras (SRB), Edmond Ho (HKG)

26 July 2021
14:00
v

Report

Romania	12–21	ROC
Pts: three players 4		Pts: O. Frolkina, Logunova 8

Aomi Urban Sports Park, Tokyo
Referees: Vanessa Devlin (AUS), Glenn Tuitt (USA)

26 July 2021
21:25
v

Report

France	17–14	ROC
Pts: Touré 10		Pts: three players 4

Aomi Urban Sports Park, Tokyo
Referees: Jasmina Juras (SRB), Shi Qirong (CHN)

27 July 2021
17:25
v

Report

ROC	17–9	Italy
Pts: O. Frolkina 6		Pts: Rulli 5

Aomi Urban Sports Park, Tokyo
Referees: Marek Maliszewski (POL), Vanessa Devlin (AUS)

Semifinal

28 July 2021
18:10
v

Report

ROC	21–14	China
Pts: Kozik 10		Pts: Zhang 7

Aomi Urban Sports Park, Tokyo
Referees: Cecília Tóth (HUN), Marek Maliszewski (POL)

Gold medal match

28 July 2021
21:55
v

Report

United States	18–15	ROC
Pts: Dolson 7		Pts: Logunova 6

Aomi Urban Sports Park, Tokyo
Referees: Edmond Ho (HKG), Cecília Tóth (HUN)

== Boxing ==
One Russian boxer entered into the Olympic tournament: Albert Batyrgaziev scored a round-of-16 victory to secure a spot in the men's featherweight division at the 2020 European Qualification Tournament in London, United Kingdom.

Men

Athlete	Event	Round of 32	Round of 16	Quarterfinals	Semifinals	Final	
Athlete	Event	Opposition Result	Opposition Result	Opposition Result	Opposition Result	Opposition Result	Rank
Albert Batyrgaziev	Featherweight	Bye	de la Cruz (DOM); W 5–0	Erdenebatyn (MGL); W 3–2	Álvarez (CUB); W 3–2	Ragan (USA); W 3–2	1st place, gold medalist(s)
Gabil Mamedov	Lightweight	Durkacz (POL); W 5–0	Colin (MRI); W 5–0	Davis (USA); L 1–4	Did not advance		
Andrey Zamkovoy	Welterweight	Bye	Zimba (ZAM); W 4–1	Madiev (GEO); W 5–0	Iglesias (CUB); L 0–5	Did not advance	3rd place, bronze medalist(s)
Gleb Bakshi	Middleweight	Bye	Isley (USA); W 3–2	Valsaint (HAI); W 5–0	Sousa (BRA); L 1–4	Did not advance	3rd place, bronze medalist(s)
Imam Khataev	Light heavyweight	Assaghir (MAR); W RSC	Nurdauletov (KAZ); W 4–1	Jalidov (ESP); W KO	Whittaker (GBR); L 1–4	Did not advance	3rd place, bronze medalist(s)
Muslim Gadzhimagomedov	Heavyweight	Bye	Benchabla (ALG); W 5–0	Abduljabbar (GER); W 5–0	Nyika (NZL); W 4–1	La Cruz (CUB); L 0–5	2nd place, silver medalist(s)
Ivan Veriasov	Super heavyweight	Bye	Yegnong (CMR); W 5–0	Kunkabayev (KAZ); L 1–4	Did not advance		

Women

Athlete	Event	Round of 32	Round of 16	Quarterfinals	Semifinals	Final	
Athlete	Event	Opposition Result	Opposition Result	Opposition Result	Opposition Result	Opposition Result	Rank
Svetlana Soluianova	Flyweight	Fuchs (USA); L 2–3	Did not advance				
Liudmila Vorontsova	Featherweight	Testa (ITA); L 1–4	Did not advance				
Saadat Dalgatova	Welterweight	Manikon (THA); L 1–4	Did not advance				
Zemfira Magomedalieva	Middleweight	—N/a	Graham (USA); W 4–1	Gramane (MOZ); W 4–1	Li Q (CHN); L 0–5	Did not advance	3rd place, bronze medalist(s)

== Canoeing ==
=== Slalom ===
Russian canoeists qualified one boat for each of the following classes through the 2019 ICF Canoe Slalom World Championships in La Seu d'Urgell, Spain.

Athlete	Event	Preliminary						Semifinal		Final	
Athlete	Event	Run 1	Rank	Run 2	Rank	Best	Rank	Time	Rank	Time	Rank
Pavel Eigel	Men's C-1	119.60	15	DNS		119.60	18	Did not advance			
Pavel Eigel	Men's K-1	96.53	12	92.82	9	92.82	9 Q	151.41	20	Did not advance	
Alsu Minazova	Women's C-1	176.02	22	118.45	12	118.45	14 Q	135.80	14	Did not advance	
Alsu Minazova	Women's K-1	120.60	18	115.39	18	115.39	20 Q	120.66	17	Did not advance	

=== Sprint ===
Russian canoeists qualified five boats in each of the following distances for the Games through the 2019 ICF Canoe Sprint World Championships in Szeged, Hungary. Meanwhile, two additional boats were awarded to the Russian squad each in the men's K-1 200 m and women's C-2 500 m, respectively, with a top-two national finish at the 2021 European Canoe Sprint Qualifying Regatta.

Men

Athlete	Event	Heats		Quarterfinals		Semifinals		Final	
Athlete	Event	Time	Rank	Time	Rank	Time	Rank	Time	Rank
Vladislav Chebotar	C-1 1000 m	4:28.951	3 QF	4:18.517	4	Did not advance			
Viktor Melantyev	C-1 1000 m	4:14.004	5 QF	4:11.095	3	Did not advance			
Vladislav Chebotar; Viktor Melantyev	C-2 1000 m	4:00.218	4 QF	4:09.956	5 FB	Did not advance		3:30.406	9
Oleg Gusev	K-1 200 m	35.928	3 QF	35.581	3	Did not advance			
Evgenii Lukantsov	K-1 200 m	35.157	3 QF	35.184	2 SF	36.036	5 FB	36.369	12
Roman Anoshkin	K-1 1000 m	3:50.580	6 QF	3:45.712	3	Did not advance			
Maxim Spesivtsev	K-1 1000 m	3:42.888	4 QF	3:44.136	1 SF	3:27.372	7 FB	3:27.909	13
Roman Anoshkin; Maxim Spesivtsev	K-2 1000 m	3:20.610	3 QF	3:14.045	4 FB	Did not advance		3:19.680	9
Roman Anoshkin; Artem Kuzakhmetov; Aleksandr Sergeyev; Maxim Spesivtsev	K-4 500 m	1:30.763	4 QF	1:25.564	6 SF	1:24.340	4 FA	1:23.654	4

Women

Athlete	Event	Heats		Quarterfinals		Semifinals		Final	
Athlete	Event	Time	Rank	Time	Rank	Time	Rank	Time	Rank
Irina Andreeva	C-1 200 m	48.192	5 QF	46.637	2 SF	49.147	7 FB	48.930	15
Olesia Romasenko	C-1 200 m	46.126	2 SF	Bye		47.368	2 FA	47.777	7
Irina Andreeva; Olesia Romasenko	C-2 500 m	2:05.604	5 QF	2:04.703	3 SF	2:04.968	4 FA	2:04.875	8
Svetlana Chernigovskaya	K-1 200 m	41.540	2 SF	Bye		40.433	7 FB	39.977	11
Svetlana Chernigovskaya	K-1 500 m	1:52.311	5 QF	1:49.323	1 SF	1:56.066	8	Did not advance	
Natalia Podolskaya	K-1 200 m	42.845	4 QF	43.212	5	Did not advance			
Kira Stepanova	K-1 500 m	1:55.180	4 QF	1:52.190	4	Did not advance			
Varvara Baranova; Kira Stepanova	K-2 500 m	1:47.874	2 SF	Bye		1:42.069	7 FB	1:44.054	15
Svetlana Chernigovskaya; Anastasiia Dolgova; Natalia Podolskaya; Kira Stepanova	K-4 500 m	1:39.166	6 QF	1:38.372	7 FB	Did not advance		1:40.951	12

Qualification Legend: FA = Qualify to final (medal); FB = Qualify to final B (non-medal)

== Cycling ==
=== Road ===
ROC has entered a squad of four riders (three men and one woman) to compete in their respective Olympic road races, by virtue of their top 50 national finish (for men) and her top 100 individual finish (for women) in the UCI World Ranking.

Athlete	Event	Time	Rank
Pavel Sivakov	Men's road race	6:15:38	32
Aleksandr Vlasov	Men's road race	6:16:53	59
Ilnur Zakarin	Men's road race	Did not finish	
Aleksandr Vlasov	Men's time trial	58:55.40	20
Tamara Dronova	Women's road race	4:01:08	39

=== Track ===
Following the completion of the 2020 UCI Track Cycling World Championships, Russian riders accumulated spots for both men and women in the team sprint, as well as the women's omnium and madison, based on their country's results in the final UCI Olympic rankings. As a result of their place in the men's and women's team sprint, Russia won its right to enter two riders in both the men's and women's sprint and men's and women's keirin.

Sprint

Athlete	Event	Qualification		Round 1	Repechage 1	Round 2	Repechage 2	Round 3	Repechage 3	Quarterfinals	Semifinals	Final	
Athlete	Event	Time Speed (km/h)	Rank	Opposition Time Speed (km/h)	Opposition Time Speed (km/h)	Opposition Time Speed (km/h)	Opposition Time Speed (km/h)	Opposition Time Speed (km/h)	Opposition Time Speed (km/h)	Opposition Time Speed (km/h)	Opposition Time Speed (km/h)	Opposition Time Speed (km/h)	Rank
Denis Dmitriev	Men's sprint	9.331; 77.162	5 Q	Helal (FRA); W 9.859; 73.030	Bye	Wammes (CAN); W 10.127; 71.097	Bye	Kenny (GBR); W 9.828; 73.260	Bye	Paul (TTO); L, W 9.824, W 10.381	Hoogland (NED); L, L	Carlin (GBR); L, L	4
Pavel Yakushevskiy	Men's sprint	9.723; 74.051	25	Did not advance									
Daria Shmeleva	Women's sprint	10.667; 67.498	12 Q	Voynova (ROC); L	Godby (USA); Lee H-j (KOR); L	Did not advance							
Anastasia Voynova	Women's sprint	10.669; 67.485	13 Q	Shmeleva (ROC); W 11.340; 63.492	Bye	Genest (CAN); L	Kobayashi (JPN); W 11.117; 64.766	Friedrich (GER); L	Gros (FRA); Genest (CAN); L	Did not advance			

Team sprint

Athlete	Event	Qualification		First round		Final	
Athlete	Event	Time	Rank	Opposition Time	Rank	Opposition Time	Rank
Denis Dmitriev; Ivan Gladyshev; Pavel Yakushevskiy	Men's team sprint	43.097	6	Australia; L 42.915; 62.915	6 FC	Germany; L REL	6
Daria Shmeleva; Anastasia Voynova	Women's team sprint	32.476	4	Mexico; W 32.249; 55.816	3 FB	Netherlands; W 32.252; 55.810	3rd place, bronze medalist(s)

Qualification legend: FA=Gold medal final; FB=Bronze medal final

Keirin

Athlete	Event	1st Round	Repechages	Quarterfinals	Semifinals	Final
Athlete	Event	Rank	Rank	Rank	Rank	Rank
Denis Dmitriev	Men's keirin	2 Q	Bye	6	Did not advance	
Ivan Gladyshev	Men's keirin	6 R	4	Did not advance		
Daria Shmeleva	Women's keirin	2 Q	Bye	3 Q	4 FB	10
Anastasia Voynova	Women's keirin	3 R	3	Did not advance		

Omnium

Athlete	Event	Scratch race		Tempo race		Elimination race		Points race		Total	
Athlete	Event	Rank	Points	Rank	Points	Rank	Points	Rank	Points	Rank	Points
Maria Novolodskaya	Women's omnium	12	18	16	10	12	18	4	12	50	15

Madison

Athlete	Event	Points	Laps	Rank
Gulnaz Khatuntseva; Maria Novolodskaya	Women's madison	26	20	3rd place, bronze medalist(s)

=== Mountain biking ===
Two Russian mountain bikers, one male and one female, qualified based on the 2019 UCI Mountain Bike World Championships and UCI Olympic Mountain Biking rankings.

Athlete	Event	Time	Rank
Anton Sintsov	Men's cross-country	1:27:41	11
Viktoria Kirsanova	Women's cross-country	LAP (1 lap)	30

=== BMX ===
Russian riders qualified for three quota place (one men and two women) for BMX at the Olympics, as a result in the UCI BMX Olympic Qualification Ranking List of 1 June 2021.

Race

Athlete	Event	Quarterfinal		Semifinal		Final	
Athlete	Event	Points	Rank	Points	Rank	Result	Rank
Evgeny Kleshchenko	Men's race	17	6	Did not advance			
Natalia Afremova	Women's race	12	4 Q	15	5	Did not advance	
Natalia Suvorova	Women's race	14	5	Did not advance			

Freestyle

Athlete	Event	Seeding		Final	
Athlete	Event	Score	Rank	Score	Rank
Irek Rizaev	Men's freestyle	81.25	5	82.40	6
Elizaveta Posadskikh	Women's freestyle	51.30	9	63.00	9

== Diving ==
Russian divers qualified for five individual spots and a synchronized team at the Olympics through the 2019 FINA World Championships and the 2019 European Championships.

Men

Athlete	Event	Preliminary		Semifinal		Final	
Athlete	Event	Points	Rank	Points	Rank	Points	Rank
Evgeny Kuznetsov	3 m springboard	444.75	7 Q	453.85	5 Q	461.90	5
Nikita Shleikher	3 m springboard	339.70	24	Did not advance			
Aleksandr Bondar	10 m platform	513.85	3 Q	464.10	3 Q	514.50	4
Viktor Minibaev	10 m platform	391.95	14 Q	447.50	5 Q	495.85	5
Evgeny Kuznetsov; Nikita Shleikher	3 m synchronized springboard	—N/a				331.08	8
Aleksandr Bondar; Viktor Minibaev	10 m synchronized platform	—N/a				439.92	3rd place, bronze medalist(s)

Women

Athlete	Event	Preliminary		Semifinal		Final	
Athlete	Event	Points	Rank	Points	Rank	Points	Rank
Mariia Poliakova	3 m springboard	288.55	13 Q	290.10	11 Q	284.05	10
Anna Konanykhina	10 m platform	252.85	25	Did not advance			
Yulia Timoshinina	10 m platform	313.20	8 Q	319.80	6 Q	263.00	11

== Equestrian ==
ROC is fielding a squad of three equestrian riders into the Olympic team dressage competition by securing an outright berth as the top-ranked nation at the International Equestrian Federation (FEI)-designated Olympic qualifier for Group C (Central and Eastern Europe) in Moscow. Meanwhile, two eventing spots were awarded to the Russian equestrians based on the results in the individual FEI Olympic rankings for Group C (Central and Eastern Europe).

The Russian equestrian team was announced on 30 June 2021.

=== Dressage ===
Maria Shuvalova and Ilyumzhinov Famous Cross have been named the traveling alternates.

Athlete	Horse	Event	Grand Prix		Grand Prix Special		Grand Prix Freestyle		Overall	
Athlete	Horse	Event	Score	Rank	Score	Rank	Technical	Artistic	Score	Rank
Tatyana Kosterina	Diavolessa	Individual	63.866	54	—N/a		Did not advance			
Aleksandra Maksakova	Bojengels	Individual	63.898	53	—N/a		Did not advance			
Inessa Merkulova	Mister X	Individual	69.457	31	—N/a		Did not advance			
Tatyana Kosterina; Aleksandra Maksakova; Inessa Merkulova	See above	Team	6350.5	12	Did not advance		—N/a		Did not advance	

Qualification Legend: Q = Qualified for the final; q = Qualified for the final as a lucky loser

=== Eventing ===
Athlete	Horse	Event	Dressage		Cross-country			Jumping						Total	
Athlete	Horse	Event	Dressage		Cross-country			Qualifier			Final			Total	
Athlete	Horse	Event	Penalties	Rank	Penalties	Total	Rank	Penalties	Total	Rank	Penalties	Total	Rank	Penalties	Rank
Andrey Mitin	Gurza	Individual	36.10	44	30.00	66.10	37	26.0	92.10	38	Did not advance			92.10	38
Mikhail Nastenko	MP Imagine If	Individual	43.00	59	76.40	119.40	50	14.4	133.80	43	Did not advance			133.80	43

== Fencing ==
Russian fencers qualified a full squad each in the men's and women's team foil, women's team épée, and women's team sabre at the Games by finishing among the top four nations in the FIE Olympic Team Rankings, while the remaining men's teams claimed the spot each as the highest-ranked nation from Europe outside the world's top four.

Men

Athlete	Event	Round of 64	Round of 32	Round of 16	Quarterfinal	Semifinal	Final / BM	
Athlete	Event	Opposition Score	Opposition Score	Opposition Score	Opposition Score	Opposition Score	Opposition Score	Rank
Sergey Bida	Épée	Bye	Ramirez (USA); W 15–2	Kano (JPN); W 15–12	Cannone (FRA); L 12–15	Did not advance		
Sergey Khodos	Épée	Bye	Santarelli (ITA); L 10–15	Did not advance				
Pavel Sukhov	Épée	Steffen (SUI); L 12–15	Did not advance					
Sergey Bida; Nikita Glazkov; Sergey Khodos; Pavel Sukhov	Team épée	—N/a		Bye	Italy; W 45–34	China; W 45–38	Japan; L 36–45	2nd place, silver medalist(s)
Anton Borodachev	Foil	Bye	Itkin (USA); L 11–15	Did not advance				
Kirill Borodachev	Foil	Bye	Lee K-h (KOR); W 15–14	Itkin (USA); W 15–13	Cheung (HKG); L 14–15	Did not advance		
Vladislav Mylnikov	Foil	Heroui (ALG); W 15–6	Meinhardt (USA); W 15–11	Abouelkassem (EGY); L 12–15	Did not advance			
Anton Borodachev; Kirill Borodachev; Vladislav Mylnikov; Timur Safin	Team foil	—N/a		Bye	Hong Kong; W 45–39	United States; W 45–41	France; L 28–45	2nd place, silver medalist(s)
Kamil Ibragimov	Sabre	Bye	Wagner (GER); W 15–13	Szabo (GER); W 15–13	Kim J-h (KOR); L 14–15	Did not advance		
Konstantin Lokhanov	Sabre	Bye	Kim J-h (KOR); L 11–15	Did not advance				
Veniamin Reshetnikov	Sabre	Bye	El-Sissy (EGY); L 13–15	Did not advance				
Dmitriy Danilenko; Kamil Ibragimov; Konstantin Lokhanov; Veniamin Reshetnikov	Team sabre	—N/a		Bye	Germany; L 28–45	Classification semifinal Egypt; L 41–45	Seventh place final United States; W WO	7

Women

Athlete	Event	Round of 64	Round of 32	Round of 16	Quarterfinal	Semifinal	Final / BM	
Athlete	Event	Opposition Score	Opposition Score	Opposition Score	Opposition Score	Opposition Score	Opposition Score	Rank
Violetta Kolobova	Épée	Bye	Jarecka (POL); L 11–15	Did not advance				
Yulia Lichagina	Épée	Bye	Navarria (ITA); L 12–15	Did not advance				
Aizanat Murtazaeva	Épée	Hsieh (HKG); W 14–7	Choi I-j (KOR); W 15–11	K Hurley (USA); W 12–11	Kong (HKG); W 15–10	Sun Yw (CHN); L 8–12	Lehis (EST); L 8–15	4
Violetta Khrapina; Violetta Kolobova; Yulia Lichagina; Aizanat Murtazaeva	Team épée	—N/a			Italy; L 31–33	Classification semifinal Poland; L 25–31	Eighth place final Hong Kong; L 27–28	8
Inna Deriglazova	Foil	Bye	Jelińska (POL); W 15–8	Kreiss (HUN); W 15–10	Jeon H-s (KOR); W 15–7	Volpi (ITA); W 15–10	Kiefer (USA); L 13–15	2nd place, silver medalist(s)
Larisa Korobeynikova	Foil	Bye	Boubakri (TUN); W 15–3	Thibus (FRA); W 15–12	Ryan (CAN); W 15–11	Kiefer (USA); L 6–15	Volpi (ITA); W 15–14	3rd place, bronze medalist(s)
Adelina Zagidullina	Foil	Bye	Van Erven (COL); W 15–8	Ryan (CAN); L 9–15	Did not advance			
Inna Deriglazova; Larisa Korobeynikova; Marta Martyanova; Adelina Zagidullina	Team foil	—N/a			Egypt; W 45–21	United States; W 45–42	France; W 45–34	1st place, gold medalist(s)
Olga Nikitina	Sabre	Bye	Wozniak (USA); W 15–14	Bashta (AZE); W 15–13	Brunet (FRA); L 5–15	Did not advance		
Sofia Pozdniakova	Sabre	Bye	Gregorio (ITA); W 15–12	Yang Hy (CHN); W 15–8	Qian Jr (CHN); W 15–12	Brunet (FRA); W 15–10	Velikaya (ROC); W 15–11	1st place, gold medalist(s)
Sofya Velikaya	Sabre	Bye	Katona (HUN); W 15–4	Vecchi (ITA); W 15–12	Zagunis (USA); W 15–8	Márton (HUN); W 15–8	Pozdniakova (ROC); L 11–15	2nd place, silver medalist(s)
Olga Nikitina; Sofia Pozdniakova; Sofya Velikaya	Team sabre	—N/a		Bye	Japan; W 45–34	South Korea; W 45–26	France; W 45–41	1st place, gold medalist(s)

== Gymnastics ==
=== Artistic ===
ROC are fielding a full squad of four gymnasts each in both the men's and women's artistic gymnastics events by virtue of a top three finish in the team all-around at the 2018 World Artistic Gymnastics Championships in Doha, Qatar. Both teams were announced on 10 June 2021.

Men
Team

Athlete	Event	Qualification								Final							
Athlete	Event	Apparatus						Total	Rank	Apparatus						Total	Rank
Athlete	Event	F	PH	R	V	PB	HB	Total	Rank	F	PH	R	V	PB	HB	Total	Rank
Denis Ablyazin	Team	14.300	—N/a	14.800 Q	14.900 Q	—N/a				13.900	—N/a	15.033	14.866	—N/a		—N/a	
David Belyavskiy	Team	~~12.933~~	14.733 Q	~~14.000~~	~~14.300~~	15.325 Q	14.066	85.324	10	—N/a	14.841	—N/a		15.333	14.166	—N/a	
Artur Dalaloyan	Team	13.700	13.800	14.500	14.658	15.233	14.033	85.957	6 Q	14.066	13.833	14.666	14.933	14.600	13.933	—N/a	
Nikita Nagornyy	Team	15.066 Q	14.366	14.333	14.700 Q	14.966	14.466 Q	87.897	2 Q	14.666	14.466	14.700	14.966	15.166	14.366	—N/a	
Total	Team	43.066	42.899	43.633	44.258	45.524	42.565	261.945	3 Q	42.632	43.140	44.399	44.765	45.099	42.465	262.500	1st place, gold medalist(s)

Individual

Athlete	Event	Qualification								Final							
Athlete	Event	Apparatus						Total	Rank	Apparatus						Total	Rank
Athlete	Event	F	PH	R	V	PB	HB	Total	Rank	F	PH	R	V	PB	HB	Total	Rank
Denis Ablyazin	Rings	—N/a		14.800	—N/a			14.800	7 Q	—N/a		14.833	—N/a			14.833	6
Denis Ablyazin	Vault	—N/a			14.733	—N/a		14.733	5 Q	—N/a			14.783	—N/a		14.783	2nd place, silver medalist(s)
David Belyavskiy	Pommel horse	—N/a	14.733	—N/a				14.733	9 Q*	—N/a	14.833	—N/a				14.833	4
David Belyavskiy	Parallel bars	—N/a				15.325	—N/a	15.325	9 Q*	—N/a				15.200	—N/a	15.200	5
Artur Dalaloyan	All-around	See team results								14.050	13.900	14.666	14.466	15.033	14.133	86.248	6
Aleksandr Kartsev	All-around	13.733	13.500	13.633	14.533	14.900	12.000	82.299	29	Did not advance							
Nikita Nagornyy	All-around	See team results								14.433	14.266	14.666	14.900	15.400	14.366	88.031	3rd place, bronze medalist(s)
Nikita Nagornyy	Floor	15.066	—N/a					15.066	2 Q	13.066	—N/a					13.066	7
Nikita Nagornyy	Vault	—N/a			14.783	—N/a		14.783	3 Q	—N/a			14.716	—N/a		14.716	5
Nikita Nagornyy	Horizontal bar	—N/a					14.466	14.466	5 Q	—N/a					14.533	14.533	3rd place, bronze medalist(s)
Vladislav Polyashov	Pommel horse	—N/a	14.366	—N/a				14.366	14	Did not advance							
Vladislav Polyashov	Parallel bars	—N/a				15.133	—N/a	15.133	15	Did not advance							

Women
Team

Athlete	Event	Qualification						Final					
Athlete	Event	Apparatus				Total	Rank	Apparatus				Total	Rank
Athlete	Event	V	UB	BB	F	Total	Rank	V	UB	BB	F	Total	Rank
Lilia Akhaimova	Team	14.699 Q	12.900	12.266	13.633	53.565	28	14.733	—N/a			—N/a	
Viktoria Listunova	Team	14.300	14.766	13.866	14.000 Q	56.932	6	—N/a	14.900	14.333	14.166	—N/a	
Angelina Melnikova	Team	14.616 Q	14.933 Q	13.733	14.000 Q	57.132	4 Q	14.600	14.933	12.566	13.966	—N/a	
Vladislava Urazova	Team	14.600	14.866	14.000 Q	13.633	57.099	5 Q	14.466	14.866	12.633	13.366	—N/a	
Total	Team	43.832	44.565	41.599	41.633	171.629	1 Q	43.799	44.699	39.532	41.498	169.528	1st place, gold medalist(s)

Individual

Athlete	Event	Qualification						Final					
Athlete	Event	Apparatus				Total	Rank	Apparatus				Total	Rank
Athlete	Event	V	UB	BB	F	Total	Rank	V	UB	BB	F	Total	Rank
Lilia Akhaimova	Vault	14.699	—N/a			14.699	7 Q	14.666	—N/a			14.666	6
Elena Gerasimova	All-around	13.466	13.233	13.766	12.333	52.798	38	Did not advance					
Anastasia Ilyankova	Uneven bars	—N/a	14.966	—N/a		14.966	3 Q	—N/a	14.833	—N/a		14.833	2nd place, silver medalist(s)
Viktoria Listunova	Floor	—N/a			14.000	14.000	6 Q	—N/a			12.400	12.400	8
Angelina Melnikova	All-around	See team results						14.633	14.900	13.700	13.966	57.199	3rd place, bronze medalist(s)
Angelina Melnikova	Vault	14.616	—N/a			14.616	9 Q	14.683	—N/a			14.683	5
Angelina Melnikova	Uneven bars	—N/a	14.933	—N/a		14.933	4 Q	—N/a	13.066	—N/a		13.066	8
Angelina Melnikova	Floor	—N/a			14.000	14.000	7 Q	—N/a			14.166	—N/a	3rd place, bronze medalist(s)
Vladislava Urazova	All-around	See team results						14.500	14.866	14.200	13.400	56.966	4
Vladislava Urazova	Balance beam	—N/a		14.000	—N/a	14.000	8 Q	—N/a		12.733	—N/a	12.733	8

=== Rhythmic ===
ROC qualified a squad of rhythmic gymnasts for the group all-around by virtue of a top-three finish at the 2018 World Championships in Sofia, Bulgaria. Two more rhythmic gymnasts were added to the roster by finishing in the top sixteen of the individual all-around at the 2019 World Championships in Baku, Azerbaijan.

Athlete	Event	Qualification						Final					
Athlete	Event	Hoop	Ball	Clubs	Ribbon	Total	Rank	Hoop	Ball	Clubs	Ribbon	Total	Rank
Arina Averina	Individual	27.225	27.250	28.100	23.600	106.175	2 Q	26.850	27.900	27.800	19.550	102.100	4
Dina Averina	Individual	27.625	27.600	28.275	22.800	106.300	1 Q	27.200	28.300	28.150	24.000	107.650	2nd place, silver medalist(s)

Athletes	Event	Qualification				Final			
Athletes	Event	5 apps	3+2 apps	Total	Rank	5 apps.	3+2 apps	Total	Rank
Anastasia Bliznyuk; Anastasia Maksimova; Angelina Shkatova; Anastasia Tatareva; Alisa Tishchenko	Group	45.750	43.200	89.050	2 Q	46.200	44.200	90.400	2nd place, silver medalist(s)

=== Trampoline ===
ROC qualified one gymnast each for the men's and women's trampoline by finishing in the top eight, respectively, at the 2019 World Championships in Tokyo, Japan. They qualified an additional spot for the men's and women's trampoline during the 2019–2020 Trampoline World Cup series.

Athlete	Event	Qualification		Final	
Athlete	Event	Score	Rank	Score	Rank
Dmitry Ushakov	Men's	109.485	8 Q	59.600	5
Andrey Yudin	Men's	111.245	7 Q	58.235	6
Susana Kochesok	Women's	102.790	6 Q	54.290	7
Yana Lebedeva	Women's	71.805	11	Did not advance	

== Handball ==
Summary

Key:

- ET: After extra time
- P – Match decided by penalty-shootout.

Team	Event	Group stage						Quarterfinal	Semifinal	Final / BM	
Team	Event	Opposition Score	Opposition Score	Opposition Score	Opposition Score	Opposition Score	Rank	Opposition Score	Opposition Score	Opposition Score	Rank
ROC women's	Women's tournament	Brazil; D 24–24	Sweden; L 24–36	Hungary; W 38–31	France; W 28–27	Spain; W 34–31	2 Q	Montenegro; W 32–26	Norway; W 27–26	France; L 25–30	2nd place, silver medalist(s)

=== Women's tournament ===
ROC's handball team qualified for the Olympics by securing a top-two finish at the Győr leg of the 2020 IHF Olympic Qualification Tournament.

Team roster

The squad was announced on 5 July 2021.

Head coach: Alexey Alekseev

No.	Pos.	Name	Date of birth (age)	Height	App.	Goals	Club
1	GK	Anna Sedoykina	1 August 1984 (aged 36)	1.84 m	168	9	(Russia) CSKA Moscow
2	LW	Polina Kuznetsova	6 October 1987 (aged 33)	1.68 m	163	428	(Russia) Rostov-Don
3	LW	Polina Gorshkova	22 November 1989 (aged 31)	1.73 m	23	44	(Russia) CSKA Moscow
7	CB	Daria Dmitrieva	9 August 1995 (aged 25)	1.78 m	108	365	(Russia) CSKA Moscow
8	LB/P	Anna Sen	12 March 1990 (aged 31)	1.86 m	158	387	(Russia) Rostov-Don
13	RB	Anna Vyakhireva	13 March 1995 (aged 26)	1.68 m	97	427	(Russia) Rostov-Don
14	LB	Polina Vedekhina	6 January 1994 (aged 27)	1.77 m	47	100	(Russia) CSKA Moscow
17	LB	Vladlena Bobrovnikova	24 October 1987 (aged 33)	1.80 m	81	209	(Russia) Rostov-Don
19	P	Kseniya Makeyeva	19 September 1990 (aged 30)	1.86 m	164	313	(Russia) Rostov-Don
23	LB	Elena Mikhaylichenko	14 September 2001 (aged 19)	1.80 m	17	23	(Russia) CSKA Moscow
25	RW	Olga Fomina	17 April 1989 (aged 32)	1.75 m	140	294	(Russia) HC Lada
33	CB	Ekaterina Ilina	7 March 1991 (aged 30)	1.74 m	108	274	(Russia) CSKA Moscow
36	RW	Yulia Managarova	27 September 1988 (aged 32)	1.67 m	59	197	(Russia) Rostov-Don
39	RB	Antonina Skorobogatchenko	14 February 1999 (aged 22)	1.82 m	47	112	(Russia) CSKA Moscow
88	GK	Victoriya Kalinina	8 December 1988 (aged 32)	1.82 m	106	1	(Russia) Rostov-Don

Group play

Pos	Team	Pld	W	D	L	GF	GA	GD	Pts	Qualification
1	Sweden	5	3	1	1	152	133	+19	7 (Note: Sweden 36–24 ROC)	Quarter-finals
2	ROC	5	3	1	1	148	149	−1	7	Quarter-finals
3	France	5	2	1	2	139	135	+4	5	Quarter-finals
4	Hungary	5	2	0	3	142	149	−7	4 (Note: Hungary 29–25 Spain)	Quarter-finals
5	Spain	5	2	0	3	135	142	−7	4	
6	Brazil	5	1	1	3	133	141	−8	3	

Source: Tokyo 2020 and IHF
Rules for classification: 1) Points; 2) Head-to-head points; 3) Head-to-head goal difference; 4) Head-to-head goals scored; 5) Goal difference; 6) Goals scored; 7) Draw.
Notes:

25 July 2021; 11:00	ROC	24–24	Brazil	Yoyogi National Gymnasium, Tokyo; Referees: Fonseca, Santos (POR)
25 July 2021; 11:00	Ilyina 6	(14–12)	De Paula 7	Yoyogi National Gymnasium, Tokyo; Referees: Fonseca, Santos (POR)
25 July 2021; 11:00	2× (yellow card) 3× (suspension)	Report	1× (yellow card) 4× (suspension)	Yoyogi National Gymnasium, Tokyo; Referees: Fonseca, Santos (POR)

27 July 2021; 14:15	Sweden	36–24	ROC	Yoyogi National Gymnasium, Tokyo; Referees: El-Saied, El-Saied (EGY)
27 July 2021; 14:15	Strömberg 8	(15–9)	Vedekhina 5	Yoyogi National Gymnasium, Tokyo; Referees: El-Saied, El-Saied (EGY)
27 July 2021; 14:15	1× (suspension)	Report	1× (yellow card) 4× (suspension)	Yoyogi National Gymnasium, Tokyo; Referees: El-Saied, El-Saied (EGY)

29 July 2021; 19:30	Hungary	31–38	ROC	Yoyogi National Gymnasium, Tokyo; Referees: Brunner, Salah (SUI)
29 July 2021; 19:30	Klujber 9	(17–22)	Dmitrieva 7	Yoyogi National Gymnasium, Tokyo; Referees: Brunner, Salah (SUI)
29 July 2021; 19:30	1× (yellow card) 5× (suspension)	Report	1× (yellow card) 5× (suspension)	Yoyogi National Gymnasium, Tokyo; Referees: Brunner, Salah (SUI)

31 July 2021; 14:15	ROC	28–27	France	Yoyogi National Gymnasium, Tokyo; Referees: Hansen, Madsen (DEN)
31 July 2021; 14:15	Ilyina 9	(15–17)	Pineau 9	Yoyogi National Gymnasium, Tokyo; Referees: Hansen, Madsen (DEN)
31 July 2021; 14:15	2× (yellow card) 1× (suspension)	Report	1× (yellow card) 2× (suspension)	Yoyogi National Gymnasium, Tokyo; Referees: Hansen, Madsen (DEN)

2 August 2021; 14:15	Spain	31–34	ROC	Yoyogi National Gymnasium, Tokyo; Referees: Hansen, Madsen (DEN)
2 August 2021; 14:15	López 7	(17–18)	Vyakhireva 7	Yoyogi National Gymnasium, Tokyo; Referees: Hansen, Madsen (DEN)
2 August 2021; 14:15	1× (yellow card) 1× (suspension)	Report	2× (suspension)	Yoyogi National Gymnasium, Tokyo; Referees: Hansen, Madsen (DEN)

Quarterfinal

4 August 2021; 09:30	Montenegro	26–32	ROC	Yoyogi National Gymnasium, Tokyo; Referees: Kurtagic, Wetterwik (SWE)
4 August 2021; 09:30	Radičević 10	(15–17)	Vyakhireva 8	Yoyogi National Gymnasium, Tokyo; Referees: Kurtagic, Wetterwik (SWE)
4 August 2021; 09:30	1× (yellow card) 1× (suspension)	Report	7× (suspension)	Yoyogi National Gymnasium, Tokyo; Referees: Kurtagic, Wetterwik (SWE)

Semifinal

6 August 2021; 21:00	Norway	26–27	ROC	Yoyogi National Gymnasium, Tokyo; Referees: Bonaventura, Bonaventura (FRA)
6 August 2021; 21:00	Mørk 10	(11–14)	Vyakhireva 9	Yoyogi National Gymnasium, Tokyo; Referees: Bonaventura, Bonaventura (FRA)
6 August 2021; 21:00	1× (yellow card) 4× (suspension)	Report	1× (yellow card) 3× (suspension) 1× (red card)	Yoyogi National Gymnasium, Tokyo; Referees: Bonaventura, Bonaventura (FRA)

Gold medal game

8 August 2021; 15:00	ROC	25–30	France	Yoyogi National Gymnasium, Tokyo; Referees: Lah, Sok (SLO)
8 August 2021; 15:00	Vedekhina 7	(13–15)	Foppa, Pineau 7	Yoyogi National Gymnasium, Tokyo; Referees: Lah, Sok (SLO)
8 August 2021; 15:00	1× (yellow card) 5× (suspension)	Report	1× (yellow card) 5× (suspension)	Yoyogi National Gymnasium, Tokyo; Referees: Lah, Sok (SLO)

== Judo ==
Men

Athlete	Event	Round of 64	Round of 32	Round of 16	Quarterfinals	Semifinals	Repechage	Final / BM	
Athlete	Event	Opposition Result	Opposition Result	Opposition Result	Opposition Result	Opposition Result	Opposition Result	Opposition Result	Rank
Robert Mshvidobadze	−60 kg	—N/a	Bye	Tsjakadoea (NED); L 00–01	Did not advance				
Yakub Shamilov	−66 kg	—N/a	Seidl (GER); W 10–00	Margvelashvili (GEO); L 00–01	Did not advance				
Musa Mogushkov	−73 kg	Bye	Orujov (AZE); L 00–01	Did not advance					
Alan Khubetsov	−81 kg	Bye	Zoloev (KGZ); W 10–00	Valois-Fortier (CAN); W 01–00	Casse (BEL); L 00–01	Did not advance	Ressel (GER); L 00–10	Did not advance	
Mikhail Igolnikov	−90 kg	Bye	Dossou Yovo (BEN); W 10–00	Mehdiyev (AZE); W 01–00	Sherazadishvili (ESP); W 10–00	Bekauri (GEO); L 00–01	Bye	Tóth (HUN); L 00–01	5
Niyaz Ilyasov	−100 kg	—N/a	Bye	Cirjenics (HUN); W 10–00	Fonseca (POR); L 00–01	Did not advance	Frey (GER); W 01–00	Liparteliani (GEO); W 01–00	3rd place, bronze medalist(s)
Tamerlan Bashaev	+100 kg	—N/a	Bye	Ndiaye (SEN); W 10–00	Riner (FRA); W 01–00	Tushishvili (GEO); L 01–11	Bye	Khammo (UKR); W 10–00	3rd place, bronze medalist(s)

Women

Athlete	Event	Round of 32	Round of 16	Quarterfinals	Semifinals	Repechage	Final / BM	
Athlete	Event	Opposition Result	Opposition Result	Opposition Result	Opposition Result	Opposition Result	Opposition Result	Rank
Irina Dolgova	−48 kg	Bhatta (NEP); W 10–00	Lin C-h (TPE); L 00–01	Did not advance				
Natalia Kuziutina	−52 kg	Jiménez (PAN); W 10–00	Park D-s (KOR); L 00–01	Did not advance				
Daria Mezhetskaia	−57 kg	Lu Tj (CHN); L 01–10	Did not advance					
Daria Davydova	−63 kg	Barrios (VEN); L 00–10	Did not advance					
Madina Taimazova	−70 kg	Bernabéu (ESP); W 01–00	Portela (BRA); W 01–00	Teltsidou (GRE); W 10–00	Arai (JPN); L 00–10	Bye	Matić (CRO); W 01–00	3rd place, bronze medalist(s)
Aleksandra Babintseva	−78 kg	Branser (COD); W 10–01	Kuka (KOS); W 01–00	Hamada (JPN); L 00–11	Did not advance	Aguiar (BRA); L 00–10	Did not advance	

Mixed

Athlete	Event	Round of 16	Quarterfinals	Semifinals	Repechage	Final / BM	
Athlete	Event	Opposition Result	Opposition Result	Opposition Result	Opposition Result	Opposition Result	Rank
Aleksandra Babintseva; Tamerlan Bashaev; Mikhail Igolnikov; Daria Mezhetskaia; Musa Mogushkov; Madina Taimazova	Team	Bye	Mongolia; W 4–2	Japan; L 0–4	Bye	Israel; L 1–4	5

== Karate ==
One Russian karateka entered into the inaugural Olympic tournament: Anna Chernysheva qualified directly for the women's kumite 55 kg category by finishing top three at 2021 World Olympic Qualification Tournament in Paris, France.

Athlete	Event	Preliminary round					Semifinals	Final	
Athlete	Event	Opposition Score	Opposition Score	Opposition Score	Opposition Score	Rank	Opposition Score	Opposition Score	Rank
Anna Chernysheva	Women's −55 kg	Did not start							

== Modern pentathlon ==
Russian athletes qualified for the following spots in the modern pentathlon at the Games. Alexander Lifanov and Adelina Ibatullina confirmed places each in the men's and women's event, respectively, with the former and the latter finishing seventh among those eligible for Olympic qualification at the 2019 European Championships in Bath, England.

Athlete	Event	Fencing (épée one touch)				Swimming (200 m freestyle)			Riding (show jumping)			Combined: shooting/running (10 m air pistol)/(3200 m)			Total points	Final rank
Athlete	Event	RR	BR	Rank	MP points	Time	Rank	MP points	Penalties	Rank	MP points	Time	Rank	MP Points	Total points	Final rank
Alexander Lifanov	Men's	25–10	1	2	251	2:05.60	27	299	21	21	279	11:19.18	16	621	1450	10
Uliana Batashova	Women's	23–12	1	4	239	2:11.14	10	288	7	8	293	12:59.27	22	521	1341	9
Gulnaz Gubaydullina	Women's	14–21	0	32	184	2:07.31 OR	1	296	EL	31	0	12:07.58	6	573	1053	32

== Rowing ==
ROC qualified seven boats for each of the following rowing classes into the Olympic regatta. Rowing crews in the women's single sculls and women's lightweight double sculls confirmed Olympic places for their boats at the 2021 FISA European Olympic Qualification Regatta in Varese, Italy. Meanwhile, four more crews (men's single sculls, men's double sculls, women's double sculls, and women's pair) were added to the Russian roster with their top-two finish at the 2021 FISA Final Qualification Regatta in Lucerne, Switzerland.

Men

Athlete	Event	Heats		Repechage		Quarterfinals		Semifinals		Final	
Athlete	Event	Time	Rank	Time	Rank	Time	Rank	Time	Rank	Time	Rank
Aleksandr Vyazovkin	Single sculls	7:14.95	2 QF	Bye		7:20.04	3 SA/B	6:44.56	3 FA	6:49.09	5
Ilya Kondratyev; Andrey Potapkin	Double sculls	6:16.09	3 SA/B	Bye		—N/a		6:26.58	4 FB	6:13.73	7

Women

Athlete	Event	Heats		Repechage		Quarterfinals		Semifinals		Final	
Athlete	Event	Time	Rank	Time	Rank	Time	Rank	Time	Rank	Time	Rank
Hanna Prakatsen	Single sculls	7:48.74	1 QF	Bye		7:49.64	1 SA/B	7:23.61	1 FA	7:17.39	2nd place, silver medalist(s)
Elena Oriabinskaia; Vasilisa Stepanova	Pair	7:23.39	2 SA/B	Bye		—N/a		6:50.24	2 FA	6:51.45	2nd place, silver medalist(s)
Ekaterina Kurochkina; Ekaterina Pitirimova	Double sculls	7:03.96	4 R	7:13.77	1 SA/B	—N/a		7:24.37	6 FB	7:01.83	12
Maria Botalova; Anastasia Lebedeva	Lightweight double sculls	7:07.67	3 R	7:22.72	2 SA/B	—N/a		6:45.23	4 FB	6:51.65	9

Qualification Legend: FA=Final A (medal); FB=Final B (non-medal); FC=Final C (non-medal); FD=Final D (non-medal); FE=Final E (non-medal); FF=Final F (non-medal); SA/B=Semifinals A/B; SC/D=Semifinals C/D; SE/F=Semifinals E/F; QF=Quarterfinals; R=Repechage

== Rugby sevens ==
Summary

Team	Event	Group stage				Quarterfinal	Semifinal / Cl.	Final / BM / Pl.	
Team	Event	Opposition Score	Opposition Score	Opposition Score	Rank	Opposition Score	Opposition Score	Opposition Score	Rank
ROC women's	Women's tournament	Great Britain; L 12–14	Kenya; W 35–12	New Zealand; L 0–33	3 Q	New Zealand; L 0–35	Australia; L 7–35	China; L 10–22	8

=== Women's tournament ===
The Russian women's rugby sevens team qualified by securing a spot in the final repechage tournament on 20 June 2021.

Team roster

- Women's team event – 1 team of 12 players

Squad

The ROC's squad of 12 players is as follows.

Head coach: Andrey Kuzin

- Anna Baranchuk
- Iana Danilova
- Baizat Khamidova
- Marina Kukina
- Daria Lushina
- Daria Noritsina
- Mariya Pogrebnyak
- Kristina Seredina
- Daria Shestakova
- Nadezhda Sozonova
- Alena Tiron (c)
- Elena Zdrokova

Group play

Pos	Team	Pld	W	D	L	PF	PA	PD	Pts	Qualification
1	New Zealand	3	3	0	0	88	28	+60	9	Quarter-finals
2	Great Britain	3	2	0	1	66	38	+28	7	Quarter-finals
3	ROC	3	1	0	2	47	59	−12	5	Quarter-finals
4	Kenya	3	0	0	3	19	95	−76	3	

Source: Tokyo 2020 and World Rugby
Rules for classification: 1) Points; 2) Head-to-head result; 3) Point difference; 4) Points scored.

Group stage

29 July 2021
11:00

ROC	12–14	Great Britain
Try: Khamidova 1' m Seredina 12' c Con: Seredina (1/2) 13'	(Tokyo 2020)	Try: Brown (2) 4' c, 14' +1 c Con: Aitchison (2/2) 4', 14' +1

Tokyo Stadium, Tokyo

29 July 2021
19:00

ROC	35–12	Kenya
Try: Sozonova 2' c Seredina 4' c Shestakova 8' c Tiron 9' c Kukina 13' c Con: Seredina (4/4) 2', 4', 8', 9'; Lushina (1/1) 14'	(Tokyo 2020)	Try: Okelo (2) 5' c, 8' m Con: Ndunde (1/2) 5'

Tokyo Stadium, Tokyo

30 July 2021
13:00 (Note: Originally scheduled for 11:30 but delayed due to weather)

New Zealand	33–0	ROC
Try: Tui (2) 1' c, 6' c Woodman 7' c Fluhler (2) 10' c, 12' m Con: Nathan-Wong (3/3) 2', 6', 7', 10; Willison (0/1)	(Tokyo 2020)

Tokyo Stadium, Tokyo

Quarterfinal

30 July 2021
17:30

New Zealand	36–0	ROC
Try: Fitzpatrick 1' c Broughton 2' c Blyde 4' c Woodman (2) 8' c, 13' m Tui 10' c Con: Nathan-Wong (2/4) 1', 8'; Pouri-Lane (1/2) 10'	(Tokyo 2020)

Tokyo Stadium, Tokyo

5–8th place semifinal

31 July 2021
10:00

ROC	7–35	Australia
Try: Zdrokova 7' c Con: Seredina (1/1) 8'	(Tokyo 2020)	Try: Nathan 1' c Tonegato 3' c, 9' c Paki 12' c Levi 14' c Con: Hinds (3/3) 2', 4', 9'; Williams (2/2) 12', 14'

Tokyo Stadium, Tokyo

Seventh place match

31 July 2021
16:30

ROC	10–22	China
Try: Tiron 3' m Seredina 5' m Con: Seredina (0/2)	(Tokyo 2020)	Try: Wang 7' m Yang 8' c Xu 9' m Chen 12' m Con: Chen (1/4) 8'

Tokyo Stadium, Tokyo

== Sailing ==
Russian sailors qualified one boat in each of the following classes through the 2018 Sailing World Championships, the class-associated Worlds, and the continental regattas.

Athlete	Event	Race													Net points	Final rank
Athlete	Event	1	2	3	4	5	6	7	8	9	10	11	12	M*	Net points	Final rank
Aleksandr Askerov	Men's RS:X	19	18	17	20	~~DNF~~	18	20	15	19	22	19	23	EL	208	19
Sergey Komissarov	Men's Laser	24	16	17	6	15	6	13	7	4	~~29~~	—N/a		EL	98	11
Denis Gribanov; Pavel Sozykin	Men's 470	14	13	6	12	~~16~~	6	6	10	9	12	—N/a		EL	90	12
Anna Khvorikova	Women's RS:X	18	10	5	~~26~~	23	24	25	25	25	20	23	26	EL	224	22
Ekaterina Zyuzina	Women's Laser Radial	15	31	35	12	31	22	~~BFD~~	18	8	26	—N/a		EL	198	27

M = Medal race; EL = Eliminated – did not advance into the medal race

== Shooting ==
Russian shooters achieved quota places for the following events by virtue of their best finishes at the 2018 ISSF World Championships, the 2019 ISSF World Cup series, European Championships or Games, and European Qualifying Tournament, as long as they obtained a minimum qualifying score (MQS) by May 31, 2020.

Men

Athlete	Event	Qualification		Final	
Athlete	Event	Points	Rank	Points	Rank
Alexey Alipov	Trap	122 (+10)	8	Did not advance	
Artem Chernousov	10 m air pistol	577	11	Did not advance	
Leonid Ekimov	25 m rapid fire pistol	578	11	Did not advance	
Sergey Kamenskiy	10 m air rifle	628.7	10	Did not advance	
Sergey Kamenskiy	50 m rifle 3 positions	1183	1 Q	464.2	2nd place, silver medalist(s)
Vladimir Maslennikov	10 m air rifle	629.8	6 Q	123.0	8
Vadim Mukhametyanov	10 m air pistol	573	23	Did not advance	

Women

Athlete	Event	Qualification		Final	
Athlete	Event	Points	Rank	Points	Rank
Vitalina Batsarashkina	10 m air pistol	582	3 Q	240.3 OR	1st place, gold medalist(s)
Vitalina Batsarashkina	25 m pistol	586	3 Q	38 (+4) OR	1st place, gold medalist(s)
Zilia Batyrshina	Skeet	117	15	Did not advance	
Margarita Chernousova	10 m air pistol	565	35	Did not advance	
Margarita Chernousova	25 m pistol	580	19	Did not advance	
Anastasiia Galashina	10 m air rifle	628.5	8 Q	251.1	2nd place, silver medalist(s)
Yulia Karimova	10 m air rifle	627.1	13	Did not advance	
Yulia Karimova	50 m rifle 3 positions	1177	4 Q	450.3	3rd place, bronze medalist(s)
Daria Semianova	Trap	116	15	Did not advance	
Ekaterina Subbotina	Trap	116	17	Did not advance	
Natalia Vinogradova	Skeet	120+1	6 Q	17	6
Yulia Zykova	50 m rifle 3 positions	1182 OR	1 Q	461.9	2nd place, silver medalist(s)

Mixed

Athlete	Event	Qualification		Semifinal		Final / BM	
Athlete	Event	Points	Rank	Points	Rank	Opposition Score	Rank
Sergey Kamenskiy; Yulia Karimova	10 m air rifle team	628.9	6 Q	417.1	4 q	Nam T-y / Kwon E-j (KOR); W 17–9	3rd place, bronze medalist(s)
Vladimir Maslennikov; Anastasiia Galashina	10 m air rifle team	629.8	4 Q	417.0	5	Did not advance	
Vitalina Batsarashkina; Artem Chernousov	10 m air pistol team	581	2 Q	386	2 Q	Pang W Jiang Rx (CHN); L 14–16	2nd place, silver medalist(s)
Margarita Chernousova; Anton Aristarkhov	10 m air pistol team	566	15	Did not advance			
Alexey Alipov; Daria Semianova	Trap team	142	11	—N/a		Did not advance	
Ekaterina Subbotina; Maxim Kabatskiy	Trap team	139	14	—N/a		Did not advance	

== Sport climbing ==
ROC has entered three sport climbers into the Olympic tournament. Iuliia Kaplina qualified directly for the women's combined event, by finishing in the top six of those eligible for qualification at the 2019 IFSC World Olympic Qualifying Event in Toulouse, France. Meanwhile, Viktoria Meshkova and Alexey Rubtsov completed the Russian sport climbing roster for the rescheduled Games, by winning the gold medal and securing an outright berth at the 2020 IFSC European Championships in Moscow.

Athlete	Event	Qualification									Final								
Athlete	Event	Speed		Boulder		Lead			Total	Rank	Speed		Boulder		Lead			Total	Rank
Athlete	Event	Best	Place	Result	Place	Hold	Time	Place	Total	Rank	Best	Place	Result	Place	Hold	Time	Place	Total	Rank
Alexey Rubtsov	Men's	7.23	16	2T2z 7 4	4	26+	2:29	15	960.00	13	Did not advance								
Iuliia Kaplina	Women's	7.65	5	0T1z 0 2	18	14+	–	17	1530.00	17	Did not advance								
Viktoria Meshkova	Women's	9.54	15	2T4z 8 5	6	29+	–	5	450.00	9	Did not advance								

== Swimming ==
Russian swimmers further achieved qualifying standards in the following events (up to a maximum of 2 swimmers in each event at the Olympic Qualifying Time (OQT), and potentially 1 at the Olympic Selection Time (OST)): To assure their selection to the Olympic team, swimmers must finish in the top two of each individual event with the federation's corresponding standard slightly faster than the FINA A-cut at the Russian Championships & Olympic Trials (April 3 to 9) in Kazan.

Thirty-three swimmers (19 men and 14 women) were selected to the Russian roster at the end of the trials, with the Olympic medalists Anastasia Fesikova (women's backstroke double) and Yuliya Yefimova (women's breaststroke double) racing in the pool at their fourth consecutive Games. Notable swimmers also featured the reigning world champions Evgeny Rylov in the men's backstroke double, world-record holder Anton Chupkov in the men's breaststroke double, Youth Olympic champions Andrey Minakov (sprint freestyle and butterfly) and junior world-record holder Kliment Kolesnikov (sprint freestyle and backstroke), and freestyle veteran and London 2012 bronze medalist Vladimir Morozov.

Men

Athlete	Event	Heat		Semifinal		Final	
Athlete	Event	Time	Rank	Time	Rank	Time	Rank
Kirill Abrosimov	10 km open water	—N/a				1:54:29.3	19
Anton Chupkov	100 m breaststroke	59.55	15 Q	59.93	16	Did not advance	
Anton Chupkov	200 m breaststroke	2:08.54	5 Q	2:08.54	7 Q	2:07.24	4
Ilya Druzhinin	800 m freestyle	8:01.47	30	—N/a		Did not advance	
Ivan Girev	200 m freestyle	1:47.11	22	Did not advance			
Kliment Kolesnikov	50 m freestyle	21.88	10 Q	21.82	=9	Did not advance	
Kliment Kolesnikov	100 m freestyle	47.89	5 Q	47.11 ER	1 Q	47.44	3rd place, bronze medalist(s)
Kliment Kolesnikov	100 m backstroke	52.15	1 Q	52.29	2 Q	52.00	2nd place, silver medalist(s)
Aleksandr Kudashev	200 m butterfly	1:55.54	12 Q	1:55.51	12	Did not advance	
Martin Malyutin	200 m freestyle	1:45.50	6 Q	1:45.45	5 Q	1:45.01	5
Martin Malyutin	400 m freestyle	3:49.49	22	—N/a		Did not advance	
Kirill Martynychev	1500 m freestyle	14:52.66	8 Q	—N/a		14:55.85	6
Andrey Minakov	100 m freestyle	48.00	7 Q	48.03	10	Did not advance	
Andrey Minakov	100 m butterfly	51.00	4 Q	51.11	5 Q	50.88	4
Vladimir Morozov	50 m freestyle	21.92	12 Q	22.25	16	Did not advance	
Kirill Prigoda	100 m breaststroke	59.68	16 Q	59.44	11	Did not advance	
Kirill Prigoda	200 m breaststroke	2:09.21	9 Q	2:08.88	9	Did not advance	
Evgeny Rylov	100 m backstroke	53.22	7 Q	52.91	5 Q	51.98 ER	1st place, gold medalist(s)
Evgeny Rylov	200 m backstroke	1:56.02	2 Q	1:54.45	1 Q	1:53.27 OR	1st place, gold medalist(s)
Maxim Stupin	200 m individual medley	1:59.39	29	Did not advance			
Maxim Stupin	400 m individual medley	4:16.21	18	—N/a		Did not advance	
Grigory Tarasevich	200 m backstroke	1:56.82	5 Q	1:57.06	12	Did not advance	
Mikhail Vekovishchev	100 m butterfly	51.89	=18	Did not advance			
Aleksandr Yegorov	400 m freestyle	3:47.71	17	—N/a		Did not advance	
Aleksandr Yegorov	800 m freestyle	7:49.97	13	—N/a		Did not advance	
Aleksandr Yegorov	1500 m freestyle	15:06.55	19	—N/a		Did not advance	
Andrey Zhilkin	200 m individual medley	1:57.94	14 Q	1:59.05	15	Did not advance	
Vladislav Grinev; Kliment Kolesnikov; Andrey Minakov; Vladimir Morozov; Aleksandr Shchegolev^{[a]}	4 × 100 m freestyle relay	3:13.13	8 Q	—N/a		3:12.20	7
Mikhail Dovgalyuk; Ivan Girev; Aleksandr Krasnykh^{[a]} Martin Malyutin; Evgeny Rylov; Mikhail Vekovishchev^{[a]}	4 × 200 m freestyle relay	7:05.16	4 Q	—N/a		7:01.81	2nd place, silver medalist(s)
Anton Chupkov^{[a]} Vladislav Grinev^{[a]} Kliment Kolesnikov; Andrey Minakov; Kirill Prigoda; Evgeny Rylov; Grigory Tarasevich^{[a]} Mikhail Vekovishchev^{[a]}	4 × 100 m medley relay	3:31.66	3 Q	—N/a		3:29.22	4

Women

Athlete	Event	Heat		Semifinal		Final	
Athlete	Event	Time	Rank	Time	Rank	Time	Rank
Veronika Andrusenko	200 m freestyle	1:59.17	21	Did not advance			
Evgeniia Chikunova	100 m breaststroke	1:06.16	6 Q	1:06.47	6 Q	1:05.90	4
Evgeniia Chikunova	200 m breaststroke	2:22.16	3 Q	2:20.57	2 Q	2:20.88	4
Svetlana Chimrova	100 m butterfly	58.04	15 Q	57.54	11	Did not advance	
Svetlana Chimrova	200 m butterfly	2:08.84	6 Q	2:08.62	7 Q	2:07.70	5
Anna Egorova	400 m freestyle	4:08.24	15	—N/a		Did not advance	
Anna Egorova	800 m freestyle	DNS		—N/a		Did not advance	
Anastasia Fesikova	100 m backstroke	59.92	13 Q	1:00.20	=14	Did not advance	
Maria Kameneva	50 m freestyle	24.83	19	Did not advance			
Maria Kameneva	100 m freestyle	53.92	20	Did not advance			
Maria Kameneva	100 m backstroke	59.88	10 Q	59.49	10	Did not advance	
Anastasiya Kirpichnikova	400 m freestyle	4:08.01	14	—N/a		Did not advance	
Anastasiya Kirpichnikova	800 m freestyle	8:18.77	5 Q	—N/a		8:26.30	8
Anastasiya Kirpichnikova	1500 m freestyle	15:50.22	5 Q	—N/a		16:00.38	7
Anastasiya Kirpichnikova	10 km open water	—N/a				2:03:17.5	15
Valeriya Salamatina	200 m freestyle	1:58.33	16 Q	1:58.98	15	Did not advance	
Arina Surkova	50 m freestyle	24.52	9 Q	24.57	10	Did not advance	
Arina Surkova	100 m butterfly	58.02	14 Q	57.72	14	Did not advance	
Maria Temnikova	200 m breaststroke	2:23.13	7 Q	2:24.69	11	Did not advance	
Daria K Ustinova	200 m backstroke	2:13.72	22	Did not advance			
Yuliya Yefimova	100 m breaststroke	1:06.21	8 Q	1:06.34	5 Q	1:06.02	5
Veronika Andrusenko; Elizaveta Klevanovich; Daria S Ustinova; Arina Surkova	4 × 100 m freestyle relay	3:38.25	11	—N/a		Did not advance	
Veronika Andrusenko; Anna Egorova; Anastasia Guzhenkova; Valeriya Salamatina	4 × 200 m freestyle relay	7:52.04	5 Q	—N/a		7:52.15	5
Evgeniia Chikunova; Svetlana Chimrova; Anastasia Fesikova^{[a]} Maria Kameneva; Arina Surkova; Yuliya Yefimova^{[a]}	4 × 100 m medley relay	3:57.36	7 Q	—N/a		3:56.93	7

Mixed

Athlete	Event	Heat		Final	
Athlete	Event	Time	Rank	Time	Rank
Svetlana Chimrova; Maria Kameneva; Kirill Prigoda; Evgeny Rylov; Arina Surkova^{[a]} Grigory Tarasevich^{[a]}	4 × 100 m medley relay	3:43.73	7 Q	3:42.45	7

^{a} Swimmers who participated in the heats only.

== Table tennis ==
Three Russian athletes have been entered into the table tennis competition at the Games. Rio 2016 Olympian Polina Mikhailova scored a third-match final triumph to secure one of the five available places in the women's singles, while Kirill Skachkov notched the last of four men's singles spots with a repechage final victory at the 2021 ITTF World Qualification Tournament in Doha, Qatar. Meanwhile, London 2012 Olympian Yana Noskova rounded out the nation's roster by winning the third-stage final match at the European Qualification Tournament in Odivelas, Portugal.

Athlete	Event	Preliminary	Round 1	Round 2	Round 3	Round of 16	Quarterfinals	Semifinals	Final / BM	
Athlete	Event	Opposition Result	Opposition Result	Opposition Result	Opposition Result	Opposition Result	Opposition Result	Opposition Result	Opposition Result	Rank
Kirill Skachkov	Men's singles	Bye	Levajac (SRB); W 4–2	Jha (USA); W 4–2	Ovtcharov (GER); L 0–4	Did not advance				
Polina Mikhailova	Women's singles	Bye		Liu (AUT); L 3–4	Did not advance					
Yana Noskova	Women's singles	Bye	Pavade (FRA); W 4–2	Zhang (CAN); L 3–4	Did not advance					

== Taekwondo ==
Four ROC athletes have been entered into the taekwondo competition at the Games. Mikhail Artamonov (men's 58 kg), Maksim Khramtsov (men's 80 kg), defending world champion Vladislav Larin (men's +80 kg), and Tatiana Kudashova (women's 57 kg) qualified directly for their respective weight classes by finishing among the top five taekwondo practitioners at the end of the World Taekwondo Olympic Rankings.

Athlete	Event	Qualification	Round of 16	Quarterfinals	Semifinals	Repechage	Final / BM	
Athlete	Event	Opposition Result	Opposition Result	Opposition Result	Opposition Result	Opposition Result	Opposition Result	Rank
Mikhail Artamonov	Men's −58 kg	—N/a	Jendoubi (TUN); L 18–25	Did not advance		Demse (ETH); W 27–5	Guzmán (ARG); W 15–10	3rd place, bronze medalist(s)
Maksim Khramtsov	Men's −80 kg	—N/a	Sawadogo (BUR); W 13–6	Kanaet (CRO); W 22–0 PTG	Eissa (EGY); W 13–1	Bye	El-Sharabaty (JOR); W 20–9	1st place, gold medalist(s)
Vladislav Larin	Men's +80 kg	—N/a	Taufatofua (TGA); W 24–3 PTG	Trajkovič (SLO); W 16–3	Sun Hy (CHN); W 30–3 PTG	Bye	Georgievski (MKD); W 15–9	1st place, gold medalist(s)
Tatiana Minina	Women's −57 kg	Bye	Tzeli (GRE); W 15–7	Ben Yessouf (NIG); W 15–10	Alizadeh (EOR); W 10–3	Bye	Zolotic (USA); L 17–25	2nd place, silver medalist(s)

== Tennis ==
The Russian Olympic Committee has entered eight tennis players (four men and four women) into the Olympic tournament. Daniil Medvedev (world no. 2), Andrey Rublev (world no. 7), Aslan Karatsev (world no. 24), and Karen Khachanov (world no. 25) qualified directly for the men's singles as four of the top 58 eligible players in the ATP World Rankings, while Anastasia Pavlyuchenkova (world no. 19), Veronika Kudermetova (world no. 33), Ekaterina Alexandrova (world no. 34), and Elena Vesnina (former world no. 13, replace for world no. 31 Daria Kasatkina after Daria withdrew on 15 July) did so for the women's singles based on their WTA World Rankings as of 24 June 2021.

In women's doubles, the reigning Olympic champion Vesnina partnered Kudermetova. In men's doubles, Karatsev and Medvedev, Khachanov and Rublev partnered each other. In mixed doubles, Karatsev and Rublev took turns pairing with Vesnina and Pavlyuchenkova.

Men

Athlete	Event	Round of 64	Round of 32	Round of 16	Quarterfinals	Semifinals	Final / BM	
Athlete	Event	Opposition Score	Opposition Score	Opposition Score	Opposition Score	Opposition Score	Opposition Score	Rank
Aslan Karatsev	Singles	Paul (USA); W 6–3, 6–2	Chardy (FRA); L 5–7, 6–4, 3–6	Did not advance				
Karen Khachanov	Singles	Nishioka (JPN); W 3–6, 6–1, 6–2	Duckworth (AUS); W 7–5, 6–1	Schwartzman (ARG); W 6–1, 2–6, 6–1	Humbert (FRA); W 7–6^{(7–4)}, 4–6, 6–3	Carreño Busta (ESP); W 6–3, 6–3	Zverev (GER); L 3–6, 1–6	2nd place, silver medalist(s)
Daniil Medvedev	Singles	Bublik (KAZ); W 6–4, 7–6^{(10–8)}	Nagal (IND); W 6–2, 6–1	Fognini (ITA); W 6–2, 3–6, 6–2	Carreño Busta (ESP); L 2–6, 6–7^{(5–7)}	Did not advance		
Andrey Rublev	Singles	Nishikori (JPN); L 3–6, 4–6	Did not advance					
Aslan Karatsev; Daniil Medvedev	Doubles	—N/a	Klein / Polasek (SVK); L 5–7, 4–6	Did not advance				
Karen Khachanov; Andrey Rublev	Doubles	—N/a	Ram / Tiafoe (USA); L 7–6^{(7–3)}, 6–7^{(5–7)}, [10–12]	Did not advance				

Women

Athlete	Event	Round of 64	Round of 32	Round of 16	Quarterfinals	Semifinals	Final / BM	
Athlete	Event	Opposition Score	Opposition Score	Opposition Score	Opposition Score	Opposition Score	Opposition Score	Rank
Ekaterina Alexandrova	Singles	Mertens (BEL); W 4–6, 6–4, 6–4	Podoroska (ARG); L 1–6, 3–6	Did not advance				
Veronika Kudermetova	Singles	Muguruza (ESP); L 5–7, 5–7	Did not advance					
Anastasia Pavlyuchenkova	Singles	Errani (ITA); W 6–0, 6–1	Friedsam (GER); W 6–1, 6–1	Sorribes Tormo (ESP); W 6–1, 6–3	Bencic (SUI); L 0–6, 6–3, 3–6	Did not advance		
Elena Vesnina	Singles	Ostapenko (LAT); W 6–4, 6–7^{(2–7)}, 6–4	Giorgi (ITA); L 3–6, 1–6	Did not advance				
Elena Vesnina; Veronika Kudermetova	Doubles	—N/a	Siegemund / Friedsam (GER); W 6–2, 7–5	Bertens / Schuurs (NED); W 2–6, 6–3, [10–7]	Lyudmyla / Nadiia (UKR); W 6–2, 6–1	Krejčíková / Siniaková (CZE); L 3–6, 6–3, [6–10]	Pigossi / Stefani (BRA); L 6–4, 4–6, [9–11]	4

Mixed

Athlete	Event	Round of 16	Quarterfinals	Semifinals	Final / BM	
Athlete	Event	Opposition Result	Opposition Result	Opposition Result	Opposition Result	Rank
Aslan Karatsev; Elena Vesnina	Doubles	Mahut / Mladenovic (FRA); W 6–4, 6–2	Kubot / Świątek (POL); W 6–4, 6–4	Djokovic / Stojanović (SRB); W 7–6^{(7–4)}, 7–5	Rublev / Pavlyuchenkova (ROC); L 3–6, 7–6^{(7–5)}, [11–13]	2nd place, silver medalist(s)
Andrey Rublev; Anastasia Pavlyuchenkova	Doubles	Dodig / Jurak (CRO); W 5–7, 6–4, [11–9]	McLachlan / Shibahara (JPN); W 7–5, 6–7^{(0–7)}, [10–8]	Peers / Barty (AUS); W 5–7, 6–4, [13–11]	Karatsev / Vesnina (ROC); W 6–3, 6–7^{(5–7)}, [13–11]	1st place, gold medalist(s)

== Triathlon ==
Athlete	Event	Time						Rank
Athlete	Event	Swim (1.5 km)	Trans 1	Bike (40 km)	Trans 2	Run (10 km)	Total	Rank
Dmitry Polyanski	Men's	17:40	0:38	56:49	0:31	33:08	1:48:46	32
Igor Polyanski	Men's	17:47	0:41	58:30	0:35	34:34	~~1:52:07~~	DSQ
Anastasia Gorbunova	Women's	19:37	0:45	Did not finish				
Alexandra Razarenova	Women's	20:17	0:43	Lapped				

Relay

Athlete	Event	Time						Rank
Athlete	Event	Swim (300 m)	Trans 1	Bike (7 km)	Trans 2	Run (2 km)	Total group	Rank
Dmitry Polyanski	Mixed relay	3:57	0:47	9:56	0:27	5:40	20:47	—N/a
Igor Polyanski	Mixed relay	3:53	0:36	9:48	0:27	6:10	20:54	—N/a
Anastasia Gorbunova	Mixed relay	4:34	0:40	10:57	0:31	6:47	23:29	—N/a
Alexandra Razarenova	Mixed relay	3:59	0:37	10:30	0:32	6:25	22:03	—N/a
Total	Mixed relay	—N/a					~~1:27:13~~	DSQ

== Volleyball ==
=== Beach ===
Russian men's beach volleyball pair qualified for the Olympics by winning the gold medal and securing an outright berth at the 2019 FIVB World Championships in Hamburg, Germany.

Athlete	Event	Preliminary round				Repechage	Round of 16	Quarterfinals	Semifinals	Final / BM	
Athlete	Event	Opposition Score	Opposition Score	Opposition Score	Rank	Opposition Score	Opposition Score	Opposition Score	Opposition Score	Opposition Score	Rank
Ilya Leshukov; Konstantin Semenov	Men's	Herrera / Gavira (ESP); W (21–19, 22–20)	McHugh / Schumann (AUS); W (21–14, 21–16)	Mol / Sørum (NOR); W (21–19, 21–19)	1 Q	Bye	E Grimalt / M Grimalt (CHI); W (21–16, 21–16)	Mol / Sørum (NOR); L (17–21, 19–21)	Did not advance		
Viacheslav Krasilnikov; Oleg Stoyanovskiy	Men's	Gaxiola / Rubio (MEX); W (24–26, 21–15, 18–16)	Pļaviņš / Točs (LAT); L (21–13, 19–21, 11–15)	Perušič / Schweiner (CZE); W (19–21, 21–13, 15–8)	1 Q	Bye	Gavira / Herrera (ESP); W (22–20, 21–17)	Thole / Wickler (GER); W (21–16, 21–19)	Ahmed / Cherif (QAT); W (21–19, 21–17)	Mol / Sørum (NOR); L (17–21, 18–21)	2nd place, silver medalist(s)
Svetlana Kholomina; Nadezda Makroguzova	Women's	Menegatti / Orsi Toth (ITA); W (21–18, 21–15)	Lidy / Leila (CUB); W (21–16, 21–11)	Artacho / Clancy (AUS); W (21–8, 15–21, 15–12)	1 Q	Bye	Graudiņa / Kravčenoka (LAT); L (21–16, 17–21, 13–15)	Did not advance			

=== Indoor ===
Summary

Team	Event	Group stage						Quarterfinal	Semifinal	Final / BM	
Team	Event	Opposition Score	Opposition Score	Opposition Score	Opposition Score	Opposition Score	Rank	Opposition Score	Opposition Score	Opposition Score	Rank
ROC men's	Men's tournament	Argentina; W 3–1	United States; W 3–1	Brazil; W 3–0	France; L 1–3	Tunisia; W 3–0	1 Q	Canada; W 3–0	Brazil; W 3–1	France; L 2–3	2nd place, silver medalist(s)
ROC women's	Women's tournament	Italy; L 0–3	Argentina; W 3–0	China; W 3–2	United States; W 3–0	Turkey; L 2–3	4 Q	Brazil; L 1–3	Did not advance		

==== Men's tournament ====
The Russian men's volleyball team qualified for the Olympics by securing an outright berth as the highest-ranked nation for pool E at the Intercontinental Olympic Qualification Tournament in Saint Petersburg.

Team roster

The ROC roster was announced on 1 July 2021.

Head coach: (Finland) Tuomas Sammelvuo

- 1 Yaroslav Podlesnykh OH
- 4 Artem Volvich MB
- 7 Dmitry Volkov OH
- 9 Ivan Iakovlev MB
- 10 Denis Bogdan OH
- 11 Pavel Pankov S
- 15 Viktor Poletaev OP
- 17 Maxim Mikhaylov OP
- 18 Egor Kliuka OH
- 20 Ilyas Kurkaev MB
- 24 Igor Kobzar (c) S
- 27 Valentin Golubev L

Group play

Pos	Team	Pld	W	L	Pts	SW	SL	SR	SPW	SPL	SPR	Qualification
1	ROC	5	4	1	12	13	5	2.600	427	397	1.076	Quarterfinals
2	Brazil	5	4	1	10	12	8	1.500	476	450	1.058	Quarterfinals
3	Argentina	5	3	2	8	12	10	1.200	476	464	1.026	Quarterfinals
4	France	5	2	3	8	10	10	1.000	449	442	1.016	Quarterfinals
5	United States	5	2	3	6	8	10	0.800	432	412	1.049	
6	Tunisia	5	0	5	1	3	15	0.200	339	434	0.781	

Source: Tokyo 2020 and FIVB
Rules for classification: Tiebreakers

24 July 2021; 14:20 v	ROC	3–1	Argentina	Ariake Arena, Tokyo; Referees: Denny Cespedes (DOM), Paulo Turci (BRA)
24 July 2021; 14:20 v	(21–25, 25–23, 25–17, 25–21); Results Statistics			Ariake Arena, Tokyo; Referees: Denny Cespedes (DOM), Paulo Turci (BRA)

26 July 2021; 11:05 v	United States	1–3	ROC	Ariake Arena, Tokyo; Referees: Juraj Mokrý (SVK), Liu Jiang (CHN)
26 July 2021; 11:05 v	(23–25, 25–27, 25–21, 23–25); Results Statistics			Ariake Arena, Tokyo; Referees: Juraj Mokrý (SVK), Liu Jiang (CHN)

28 July 2021; 22:16 v	Brazil	0–3	ROC	Ariake Arena, Tokyo; Referees: Wojciech Maroszek (POL), Vladimir Simonović (SRB)
28 July 2021; 22:16 v	(22–25, 20–25, 20–25); Results Statistics			Ariake Arena, Tokyo; Referees: Wojciech Maroszek (POL), Vladimir Simonović (SRB)

30 July 2021; 22:35 v	ROC	1–3	France	Ariake Arena, Tokyo; Referees: Shin Muranaka (JPN), Paulo Turci (BRA)
30 July 2021; 22:35 v	(21–25, 25–20, 17–25, 20–25); Results Statistics			Ariake Arena, Tokyo; Referees: Shin Muranaka (JPN), Paulo Turci (BRA)

1 August 2021; 14:25 v	ROC	3–0	Tunisia	Ariake Arena, Tokyo; Referees: Luis Macias (MEX), Patricia Rolf (USA)
1 August 2021; 14:25 v	(25–20, 25–22, 25–16); Results Statistics			Ariake Arena, Tokyo; Referees: Luis Macias (MEX), Patricia Rolf (USA)

Quarterfinal

3 August 2021; 09:00 v	Canada	0–3	ROC	Ariake Arena, Tokyo; Referees: Hernán Casamiquela (ARG), Shin Muranaka (JPN)
3 August 2021; 09:00 v	(21–25, 28–30, 22–25); Results Statistics			Ariake Arena, Tokyo; Referees: Hernán Casamiquela (ARG), Shin Muranaka (JPN)

Semifinal

5 August 2021; 13:00 v	Brazil	1–3	ROC	Ariake Arena, Tokyo; Referees: Daniele Rapisarda (ITA), Wojciech Maroszek (POL)
5 August 2021; 13:00 v	(25–18, 21–25, 24–26, 23–25); Results Statistics			Ariake Arena, Tokyo; Referees: Daniele Rapisarda (ITA), Wojciech Maroszek (POL)

Gold medal match

7 August 2021; 21:15 v	(gold) France	3–2	ROC (silver)	Ariake Arena, Tokyo; Referees: Vladimir Simonović (SRB), Paulo Turci (BRA)
7 August 2021; 21:15 v	(25–23, 25–17, 21–25, 21–25, 15–12); Results Statistics			Ariake Arena, Tokyo; Referees: Vladimir Simonović (SRB), Paulo Turci (BRA)

==== Women's tournament ====
Russia women's volleyball team qualified for the Olympics by securing an outright berth as the highest-ranked nation for pool E at the Intercontinental Olympic Qualification Tournament in Kaliningrad.

Team roster

The ROC roster was announced on 1 July 2021.

Head coach: (Italy) Sergio Busato

- 4 Daria Pilipenko OH
- 5 Polina Matveeva S
- 6 Irina Koroleva MB
- 8 Natalia Goncharova O
- 10 Arina Fedorovtseva O
- 12 Anna Lazareva O
- 13 Yevgeniya Startseva (c) S
- 14 Irina Fetisova MB
- 16 Irina Voronkova OH
- 19 Anna Podkopaeva L
- 25 Ksenia Smirnova OH
- 26 Ekaterina Enina MB

Group play

Pos	Team	Pld	W	L	Pts	SW	SL	SR	SPW	SPL	SPR	Qualification
1	United States	5	4	1	10	12	7	1.714	418	401	1.042	Quarter-finals
2	Italy	5	3	2	10	11	7	1.571	409	377	1.085	Quarter-finals
3	Turkey	5	3	2	9	12	8	1.500	434	416	1.043	Quarter-finals
4	ROC	5	3	2	9	11	8	1.375	422	378	1.116	Quarter-finals
5	China	5	2	3	7	8	9	0.889	374	385	0.971	
6	Argentina	5	0	5	0	0	15	0.000	275	375	0.733	

Source: Tokyo 2020 and FIVB
Rules for classification: Tiebreakers

25 July 2021; 09:00	ROC	0–3	Italy	Ariake Arena, Tokyo; Referees: Patricia Rolf (USA), Wojciech Maroszek (POL)
25 July 2021; 09:00	(23–25, 19–25, 14–25); Results Statistics			Ariake Arena, Tokyo; Referees: Patricia Rolf (USA), Wojciech Maroszek (POL)

27 July 2021; 09:00	ROC	3–0	Argentina	Ariake Arena, Tokyo; Referees: Kang Joo-hee (KOR), Hamid Al-Rousi (UAE)
27 July 2021; 09:00	(25–19, 25–15, 25–13); Results Statistics			Ariake Arena, Tokyo; Referees: Kang Joo-hee (KOR), Hamid Al-Rousi (UAE)

29 July 2021; 16:25	China	2–3	ROC	Ariake Arena, Tokyo; Referees: Daniele Rapisarda (ITA), Juraj Mokrý (SVK)
29 July 2021; 16:25	(17–25, 25–23, 25–20, 25–27, 12–15); Results Statistics			Ariake Arena, Tokyo; Referees: Daniele Rapisarda (ITA), Juraj Mokrý (SVK)

31 July 2021; 11:05	United States	0–3	ROC	Ariake Arena, Tokyo; Referees: Vladimir Simonović (SRB), Hernán Casamiquela (ARG)
31 July 2021; 11:05	(20–25, 12–25, 19–25); Results Statistics			Ariake Arena, Tokyo; Referees: Vladimir Simonović (SRB), Hernán Casamiquela (ARG)

2 August 2021; 14:20	ROC	2–3	Turkey	Ariake Arena, Tokyo; Referees: Fabrice Collados (FRA), Susana Rodríguez (ESP)
2 August 2021; 14:20	(25–21, 23–25, 23–25, 25–15, 10–15); Results Statistics			Ariake Arena, Tokyo; Referees: Fabrice Collados (FRA), Susana Rodríguez (ESP)

Quarterfinal

4 August 2021; 21:30	Brazil	3–1	ROC	Ariake Arena, Tokyo; Referees: Fabrice Collados (FRA), Susana Rodríguez (ESP)
4 August 2021; 21:30	(23–25, 25–21, 25–19, 25–22); Results Statistics			Ariake Arena, Tokyo; Referees: Fabrice Collados (FRA), Susana Rodríguez (ESP)

== Water polo ==
Summary

Key:
- FT – After full time.
- P – Match decided by penalty-shootout.

Team	Event	Group stage						Quarterfinal	Semifinal	Final / BM	
Team	Event	Opposition Score	Opposition Score	Opposition Score	Opposition Score	Opposition Score	Rank	Opposition Score	Opposition Score	Opposition Score	Rank
Russia women's	Women's tournament	China; W 18–17	Hungary; D 10–10	United States; L 5–18	Japan; W 20–16	—N/a	3 Q	Australia; W 9–8	United States; L 11–15	Hungary; L 9–11	4

=== Women's tournament ===
The ROC women's water polo team qualified for the Olympics by advancing to the final match and securing an outright berth at the 2020 European Championships in Budapest, Hungary.

Team roster

ROC's final squad was announced on 13 July 2021.

Head coach: Alexandr Gaidukov

No.	Player	Pos.	L/R	Height	Weight	Date of birth (age)	Apps	OG/ Goals	Club	Ref
1	Evgeniia Golovina	GK	R	1.73 m (5 ft 8 in)	68 kg (150 lb)	14 July 1999 (aged 22)	2	0/0	(Russia) Dinamo-Uralochka Zlatoust	
2	Maria Bersneva	D	R	1.68 m (5 ft 6 in)	61 kg (134 lb)	17 December 1998 (aged 22)	20	0/0	(Russia) Dinamo-Uralochka Zlatoust	
3	Ekaterina Prokofyeva (C)	CF	R	1.76 m (5 ft 9 in)	70 kg (154 lb)	13 March 1991 (aged 30)	150	3/20	(Russia) Kinef-Surgutneftegaz	
4	Elvina Karimova	D	R	1.66 m (5 ft 5 in)	62 kg (137 lb)	25 March 1994 (aged 27)	50	1/5	(Russia) Dinamo-Uralochka Zlatoust	
5	Veronika Vakhitova	CB	R	1.78 m (5 ft 10 in)	71 kg (157 lb)	13 June 1998 (aged 23)	60	0/0	(Russia) SKIF-CSP Moskomsporta	
6	Anastasia Fedotova	D	R	1.68 m (5 ft 6 in)	61 kg (134 lb)	30 November 1998 (aged 22)	27	0/0	(Russia) Spartak Volgograd	
7	Alena Serzhantova	D	R	1.73 m (5 ft 8 in)	72 kg (159 lb)	6 May 1998 (aged 23)	25	0/0	(Russia) SKIF-CSP Moskomsporta	
8	Anastasia Simanovich	CB	R	1.74 m (5 ft 9 in)	70 kg (154 lb)	23 January 1995 (aged 26)	100	1/10	(Russia) Kinef-Surgutneftegaz	
9	Anna Timofeeva	CB	R	1.78 m (5 ft 10 in)	87 kg (192 lb)	18 July 1987 (aged 34)	45	1/3	(Russia) Yugra	
10	Evgeniya Soboleva	CB	R	1.80 m (5 ft 11 in)	75 kg (165 lb)	26 August 1988 (aged 32)	120	3/6	(Russia) Kinef-Surgutneftegaz	
11	Evgeniya Ivanova	D	R	1.76 m (5 ft 9 in)	70 kg (154 lb)	26 July 1987 (aged 33)	80	2/16	(Russia) Kinef-Surgutneftegaz	
12	Nadezhda Glyzina	D	R	1.75 m (5 ft 9 in)	68 kg (150 lb)	20 May 1988 (aged 33)	167	3/18	(Russia) Kinef-Surgutneftegaz	
13	Anna Karnaukh	GK	R	1.73 m (5 ft 8 in)	61 kg (134 lb)	31 August 1993 (aged 27)	101	2/0	(Russia) Kinef-Surgutneftegaz	
Average				1.74 m (5 ft 9 in)	69 kg (152 lb)	27 years, 246 days	73			

Note: Age as of 23 July 2021
Source: ROC Women | Tokyo 2020 Olympics Archived 2021-07-22 at the Wayback Machine

Group play

Pos	Team	Pld	W	D	L	GF	GA	GD	Pts	Qualification
1	United States	4	3	0	1	64	26	+38	6	Quarterfinals
2	Hungary	4	2	1	1	46	43	+3	5 (Note: ROC10–10 Hungary)	Quarterfinals
3	ROC	4	2	1	1	53	61	−8	5	Quarterfinals
4	China	4	2	0	2	51	50	+1	4	Quarterfinals
5	Japan (H)	4	0	0	4	44	78	−34	0	

Source: Tokyo 2020 and FINA
Rules for classification: 1) Points; 2) Head-to-head points; 3) Head-to-head goal difference; 4) Head-to-head goals scored; 5) Goal difference.
(H) Hosts
Notes:

24 July 2021; 19:50 v	Report	China	17–18	ROC	Tokyo Tatsumi International Swimming Center; Referees: Marie-Claude Deslières (CAN), Michiel Zwart (NED)
24 July 2021; 19:50 v	Report	Score by quarters: 6–5, 4–4, 4–5, 3–4			Tokyo Tatsumi International Swimming Center; Referees: Marie-Claude Deslières (CAN), Michiel Zwart (NED)
24 July 2021; 19:50 v	Report	Wang X. 4	Goals	Prokofyeva 4	Tokyo Tatsumi International Swimming Center; Referees: Marie-Claude Deslières (CAN), Michiel Zwart (NED)

26 July 2021; 15:30 v	Report	ROC	10–10	Hungary	Tokyo Tatsumi International Swimming Center; Referees: Sébastien Dervieux (FRA), Xevi Buch (ESP)
26 July 2021; 15:30 v	Report	Score by quarters: 1–2, 3–5, 3–1, 3–2			Tokyo Tatsumi International Swimming Center; Referees: Sébastien Dervieux (FRA), Xevi Buch (ESP)
26 July 2021; 15:30 v	Report	Prokofyeva 4	Goals	Leimeter, Szilágyi 2	Tokyo Tatsumi International Swimming Center; Referees: Sébastien Dervieux (FRA), Xevi Buch (ESP)

30 July 2021; 15:30 v	Report	United States	18–5	ROC	Tokyo Tatsumi International Swimming Center; Referees: Alessandro Severo (ITA), Xevi Buch (ESP)
30 July 2021; 15:30 v	Report	Score by quarters: 5–1, 4–2, 6–1, 3–1			Tokyo Tatsumi International Swimming Center; Referees: Alessandro Severo (ITA), Xevi Buch (ESP)
30 July 2021; 15:30 v	Report	Haralabidis, Steffens 4	Goals	Simanovich 2	Tokyo Tatsumi International Swimming Center; Referees: Alessandro Severo (ITA), Xevi Buch (ESP)

1 August 2021; 18:20 v	Report	ROC	20–16	Japan	Tokyo Tatsumi International Swimming Center; Referees: Marie-Claude Deslières (CAN), Dion Willis (RSA)
1 August 2021; 18:20 v	Report	Score by quarters: 5–5, 7–3, 6–4, 2–4			Tokyo Tatsumi International Swimming Center; Referees: Marie-Claude Deslières (CAN), Dion Willis (RSA)
1 August 2021; 18:20 v	Report	Serzhantova 4	Goals	Arima 5	Tokyo Tatsumi International Swimming Center; Referees: Marie-Claude Deslières (CAN), Dion Willis (RSA)

Quarterfinal

3 August 2021; 19:50 v	Report	Australia	8–9	ROC	Tokyo Tatsumi International Swimming Center; Referees: Adrian Alexandrescu (ROU), Xevi Buch (ESP)
3 August 2021; 19:50 v	Report	Score by quarters: 2–4, 2–2, 2–2, 2–1			Tokyo Tatsumi International Swimming Center; Referees: Adrian Alexandrescu (ROU), Xevi Buch (ESP)
3 August 2021; 19:50 v	Report	Armit, Halligan 2	Goals	three players 2	Tokyo Tatsumi International Swimming Center; Referees: Adrian Alexandrescu (ROU), Xevi Buch (ESP)

Semifinal

5 August 2021; 15:30 v	Report	ROC	11–15	United States	Tokyo Tatsumi International Swimming Center; Referees: Stanko Ivanovski (MNE), Dion Willis (RSA)
5 August 2021; 15:30 v	Report	Score by quarters: 3–2, 4–4, 2–5, 2–4			Tokyo Tatsumi International Swimming Center; Referees: Stanko Ivanovski (MNE), Dion Willis (RSA)
5 August 2021; 15:30 v	Report	Bersneva 3	Goals	Musselman 5	Tokyo Tatsumi International Swimming Center; Referees: Stanko Ivanovski (MNE), Dion Willis (RSA)

Bronze medal game

7 August 2021; 13:40 v	Report	Hungary	11–9	ROC	Tokyo Tatsumi International Swimming Center; Referees: Georgios Stavridis (GRE), Frank Ohme (GER)
7 August 2021; 13:40 v	Report	Score by quarters: 2–2, 5–3, 0–3, 4–1			Tokyo Tatsumi International Swimming Center; Referees: Georgios Stavridis (GRE), Frank Ohme (GER)
7 August 2021; 13:40 v	Report	Vályi 3	Goals	three players 2	Tokyo Tatsumi International Swimming Center; Referees: Georgios Stavridis (GRE), Frank Ohme (GER)

== Weightlifting ==
After the International Weightlifting Federation imposed restrictions on the number of team places available to Russian athletes following large numbers of anti-doping rule violations failures by Russian weightlifters in the ten years preceding the 2020 Summer Olympics, only two athletes were permitted to represent Russia (one male athlete and one female athlete). The Russian Olympic Committee selected Kristina Sobol and Timur Naniev.

Athlete	Event	Snatch		Clean & Jerk		Total	Rank
Athlete	Event	Result	Rank	Result	Rank	Total	Rank
Timur Naniev	Men's −109 kg	188	4	221	4	409	4
Kristina Sobol	Women's −49 kg	~~81~~	DNF	—	—	—	DNF

== Wrestling ==
ROC qualified seventeen wrestlers for each of the following classes into the Olympic competition. Nine of them finished among the top six to book Olympic spots in the men's freestyle (all classes except 125 kg), men's Greco-Roman (60, 67 and 97 kg), and women's freestyle 50 kg at the 2019 World Championships, while four additional licenses were awarded to the Russian wrestlers, who progressed to the top two finals of their respective weight categories at the 2021 European Qualification Tournament in Budapest, Hungary. Four Russian wrestlers claimed one of the remaining slots in the men's freestyle 125 kg and women's freestyle events (53, 57, & 62 kg) to complete the nation's roster at the 2021 World Qualification Tournament in Sofia, Bulgaria.

Key:

- VT (ranking points: 5–0 or 0–5) – Victory by fall.
- VB (ranking points: 5–0 or 0–5) – Victory by injury (VF for forfeit, VA for withdrawal or disqualification)
- PP (ranking points: 3–1 or 1–3) – Decision by points – the loser with technical points.
- PO (ranking points: 3–0 or 0–3) – Decision by points – the loser without technical points.
- ST (ranking points: 4–0 or 0–4) – Great superiority – the loser without technical points and a margin of victory of at least 8 (Greco-Roman) or 10 (freestyle) points.
- SP (ranking points: 4–1 or 1–4) – Technical superiority – the loser with technical points and a margin of victory of at least 8 (Greco-Roman) or 10 (freestyle) points.

Freestyle

Athlete	Event	Round of 16	Quarterfinal	Semifinal	Repechage	Final / BM	
Athlete	Event	Opposition Result	Opposition Result	Opposition Result	Opposition Result	Opposition Result	Rank
Zaur Uguev	Men's −57 kg	Gilman (USA); W 3–1 ^{PP}	Abdullaev (UZB); W 3–1 ^{PP}	Atri (IRI); W 3–1 ^{PP}	Bye	Ravi (IND); W 3–1 ^{PP}	1st place, gold medalist(s)
Gadzhimurad Rashidov	Men's −65 kg	Tevanyan (ARM); W 3–0 ^{PO}	Gadzhiev (POL); W 3–1 ^{PP}	Otoguro (JPN); L 1–3 ^{PP}	Bye	Musukaev (HUN); W 3–0 ^{PO}	3rd place, bronze medalist(s)
Zaurbek Sidakov	Men's −74 kg	Midana (GBS); W 4–1 ^{SP}	Abdurakhmonov (UZB); W 3–1 ^{PP}	Kaisanov (KAZ); W 4–0 ^{ST}	Bye	Kadzimahamedau (BLR); W 3–0 ^{PO}	1st place, gold medalist(s)
Artur Naifonov	Men's −86 kg	Makoev (SVK); W 3–0 ^{PO}	Göçen (TUR); W 4–1 ^{SP}	Yazdani (IRI); L 1–3 ^{PP}	Bye	Shapiev (UZB); W 3–0 ^{PO}	3rd place, bronze medalist(s)
Abdulrashid Sadulaev	Men's −97 kg	Sharifov (AZE); W 3–0 ^{PO}	Odikadze (GEO); W 4–0 ^{ST}	Salas (CUB); W 3–0 ^{PO}	Bye	Snyder (USA); W 3–1 ^{PP}	1st place, gold medalist(s)
Sergey Kozyrev	Men's −125 kg	Deng Zw (CHN); L 1–3 ^{PO}	Did not advance				11
Stalvira Orshush	Women's −50 kg	Stadnik (AZE); L 1–3 ^{PP}	Did not advance				10
Olga Khoroshavtseva	Women's −53 kg	Winchester (USA); L 1–3 ^{PP}	Did not advance				10
Valeria Koblova	Women's −57 kg	Valencia (MEX); W 3–1 ^{PP}	Kurachkina (BLR); L 1–3 ^{PP}	Did not advance	Malik (IND); W 3–1 ^{PP}	Nikolova (BUL); L 0–5 ^{VT}	5
Lyubov Ovcharova	Women's −62 kg	Kawai (JPN); L 0–4 ^{ST}	Did not advance		Johansson (SWE); W 3–1 ^{PP}	Yusein (BUL); L 0–4 ^{ST}	5
Khanum Velieva	Women's −68 kg	Lappage (CAN); W 3–0 ^{PO}	Soronzonbold (MGL); L 1–3 ^{PP}	Did not advance			8
Natalia Vorobieva	Women's −76 kg	Amer (EGY); W 3–1 ^{PP}	Medet Kyzy (KGZ); L 0–4 ^{ST}	Did not advance			7

Greco-Roman

Athlete	Event	Round of 16	Quarterfinal	Semifinal	Repechage	Final / BM	
Athlete	Event	Opposition Result	Opposition Result	Opposition Result	Opposition Result	Opposition Result	Rank
Sergey Emelin	Men's −60 kg	Mahmoud (EGY); W 3–1 ^{PP}	Orta (CUB); L 1–3 ^{PP}	Did not advance	Hafizov (USA); W 3–1 ^{PP}	Ciobanu (MDA); W 4–1 ^{SP}	3rd place, bronze medalist(s)
Artem Surkov	Men's −67 kg	Sancho (USA); W 3–1 ^{PP}	Nasibov (UKR); L 1–3 ^{PP}	Did not advance	Bjerrehuus (DEN); W 3–0 ^{PO}	El-Sayed (EGY); L 1–3 ^{PP}	5
Aleksandr Chekhirkin	Men's −77 kg	Leyva (MEX); W 3–0 ^{PO}	Chalyan (ARM); L 1–3 ^{PP}	Did not advance			7
Musa Evloev	Men's −97 kg	Melia (GEO); W 3–1 ^{PP}	Szőke (HUN); W 3–1 ^{PP}	Michalik (POL); W 3–1 ^{PP}	Bye	Aleksanyan (ARM); W 3–1 ^{PP}	1st place, gold medalist(s)
Sergey Semenov	Men's –130 kg	Mohamed (EGY); W 3–1 ^{PP}	Kajaia (GEO); L 1–3 ^{PP}	Did not advance	Kuosmanen (FIN); W 4–0 ^{ST}	Acosta (CHI); W 3–1 ^{PP}	3rd place, bronze medalist(s)
