= Nadezhda Sozonova =

Russian rugby sevens player

- Full name: Nadezhda Vladimirovna Sozonova
- Born: 14 August 1991 (age 35) Aksay, Rostov, Russia
- Height: 1.65 m (5 ft 5 in)
- Weight: 66 kg (146 lb)

Rugby union career
International career
Years	Team	Apps	(Points)
2016	Russia		
National sevens team
Years	Team		Comps
2008–Present	Russia		115 (361 pts)

Nadezhda Vladimirovna Sozonova (Russian: Надежда Владимировна Созонова; born 14 August 1991) is a Russian rugby sevens player. She competed in the women's tournament at the 2020 Summer Olympics.
