= Aleksandra Maksakova =

Russian equestrian

Personal information
- Full name: Aleksandra Dmitriyevna Maksakova
- Nickname: Sasha
- Born: Aleksandra Maksakova; 25 July 1997 (age 28) St Petersburg, Russia

Sport
- Country: Russia
- Sport: Equestrian

Achievements and titles
- Olympic finals: 2020 Summer Olympics
- Personal best(s): 71.804% (GP); 68.489% (GPS); 76.220% (GPF)

Aleksandra Dmitriyevna Maksakova (Russian: Александра Дмитриевна Максакова; born 25 July 1997) is a Russian dressage rider. She competed at the European Championships for Juniors, Young Riders and U25 from 2014 through 2020. Maksakova competed for the Russian dressage team at the Tokyo 2020 Olympic Games.

In 2013, Maksakova came as a 15-year-old to the Netherlands to train with three-time Olympic gold medalist Anky van Grunsven. In 2016, she moved to Belgium to train with Wim Verwimp, but decided to go back to Russia in 2017.
