= 2025 FIBA 3x3 World Cup – Men's tournament =

International basketball competition in Ulaanbaatar, Mongolia

2025 FIBA 3x3 World Cup
Tournament details
- Host country: Mongolia
- City: Ulaanbaatar
- Dates: June 23–29
- Teams: 20

Final positions
- Champions: Spain (1st title)
- Runners-up: Switzerland
- Third place: Serbia
- Fourth place: Germany

The 2025 FIBA 3x3 World Cup was held in Ulaanbaatar, Mongolia, and was contested by 20 teams.

Spain defeated Switzerland to win their first title.

== Qualified teams ==
The host, along the winners of the four Zone Cups of four FIBA zones, and the three winners of the qualifiers also qualify. The other twelve teams qualify based on the FIBA National Federation rankings.

Competition	Dates	Host	Vacancies	Qualified
Host nation	—N/a		1	Mongolia
Federation rankings	—N/a		12	Belgium; China; France; Germany; Japan; Latvia; Lithuania; Netherlands; Puerto Rico; Serbia; Spain; Switzerland
2024 FIBA 3x3 Asia Cup	27–31 March 2024	Singapore	1	Australia
2024 FIBA 3x3 Europe Cup	22–25 August 2024	(Austria) Vienna	1	Austria
2024 FIBA 3x3 Africa Cup	29 November – 1 December 2024	(Madagascar) Antananarivo	1	Madagascar
2024 FIBA 3x3 AmeriCup	13–15 December 2024	(Puerto Rico) San Juan	2	United States
FIBA 3x3 World Cup Qualifier	24–25 May 2025	(Azerbaijan) Baku	3	Canada; Great Britain; Montenegro

== Players ==
Seed	Team	Players			
1	Serbia	Nemanja Barać	Marko Branković	Dejan Majstorović	Strahinja Stojačić
2	United States	Henry Caruso	Mitch Hahn	James Parrott	Dylan Travis
3	France	Paul Djoko	Jules Rambaut	Franck Seguela	Raphaël Wilson
4	Netherlands	Bryan Alberts	Jan Driessen	Worthy de Jong	Dimeo van der Horst
5	Lithuania	Evaldas Džiaugys	Titas Januševičius	Aurelijus Pukelis	Modestas Kumpys
6	Austria	Toni Blazan	Quincy Diggs	Matthias Linortner	Fabio Söhnel
7	Latvia	Kristaps Gludītis	Kārlis Lasmanis	Nauris Miezis	Zigmārs Raimo
8	Germany	Nelson Agyeman	Sidi Beikame	Leon Fertig	Fabian Giessmann
9	Belgium	Caspar Augustijnen	Dennis Donkor	Vic Van Oosterwyck	Thibaut Vervoort
10	Mongolia	Ariunboldyn Anand	Davaasambuugiin Delgernyam	Dulguun Enkhbat	Onolbaataryn Enkhbaatar
11	China	Guo Hanyu	Wu Xingrui	Xiang Zhichao	Zhang Dianliang
12	Spain	Iván Aurrecoechea	Diego de Blas	Guim Expósito	Carlos Martínez
13	Switzerland	Jonathan Dubas	Natan Jurkovitz	Thomas Jurkovitz	Jonathan Kazadi
14	Puerto Rico	Leandro Allende	Nathaniel Butler	Luis Cuascut	Antonio Ralat
15	Japan	Ryoichi Dewa	Kenya Igo	Yuki Nakanishi	Ryo Ozawa
16	Montenegro	Petar Ivanović	Miloš Jovanović	Marko Raičević	Aleksa Vujadinović
17	Canada	Grant Audu	Jérôme Desrosiers	Alex Johnson	Aaron Rhooms
18	Australia	Jonah Antonio	Joshua Davey	Alex Higgins-Titsha	John Stith
19	Great Britain	Hafeez Abdul	Ashley Hamilton	Dwayne Lautier-Ogunleye	Evan Walshe
20	Madagascar	Elly Randriamampionona	Anthony Rasolomanana	Livio Ratinarivo	Alpha Solondrainy

== Preliminary round ==
The pools were announced on 26 May 2025.

All times are local (UTC+8).

=== Pool A ===
Pos	Team	Pld	W	L	PF	PA	PR	Qualification
1	Serbia	4	3 (Note: Head-to-head: One win, one loss, ranked by points scored.)	1	80	59	1.356	Quarterfinals
2	Australia	4	3	1	80	72	1.111	Round of 16
3	Germany	4	3	1	68	67	1.015	Round of 16
4	Belgium	4	1	3	72	70	1.029	
5	Madagascar	4	0	4	52	84	0.619	

Source: FIBA
Rules for classification: 1) Wins; 2) Head-to-head record; 3) Points scored.
Notes:

24 June 2025
11:00

Boxscore

Madagascar	11–21	Belgium
Pts: Rasolomanana 5		Pts: Donkor 10

Sükhbaatar Square, Ulaanbaatar
Referees: Deanna Jackson (USA), Shi Qirong (CHN)

24 June 2025
11:25

Boxscore

Australia	17–21	Germany
Pts: Stith 9		Pts: Giessmann 9

Sükhbaatar Square, Ulaanbaatar
Referees: Najib Chajiddine (FRA), Shi Qirong (CHN)

24 June 2025
12:40

Boxscore

Belgium	20–21	Serbia
Pts: Vervoort 10		Pts: Barać 8

Sükhbaatar Square, Ulaanbaatar
Referees: Najib Chajiddine (FRA), Deanna Jackson (USA)

24 June 2025
13:05

Boxscore

Germany	21–13	Madagascar
Pts: Giessmann 9		Pts: Randriamampionona 7

Sükhbaatar Square, Ulaanbaatar
Referees: Deanna Jackson (USA), Alex Talisainen (EST)

24 June 2025
14:30

Boxscore

Serbia	17–21	Australia
Pts: Barać 8		Pts: Antonio 10

Sükhbaatar Square, Ulaanbaatar
Referees: Shi Qirong (CHN), Alex Talisainen (EST)

26 June 2025
11:00

Boxscore

Belgium	15–21	Australia
Pts: Vervoort 6		Pts: Antonio 9

Sükhbaatar Square, Ulaanbaatar
Referees: Brigitta Csabai-Kaskötő (HUN), Alex Talisainen (EST)

26 June 2025
11:25

Boxscore

Madagascar	9–21	Serbia
Pts: Solondrainy 4		Pts: Majstorović 11

Sükhbaatar Square, Ulaanbaatar
Referees: Gonzalo Paz Chiapponi (URU), Shi Qirong (CHN)

26 June 2025
12:40

Boxscore

Germany	17–16	Belgium
Pts: Giessmann 7		Pts: Vervoort 6

Sükhbaatar Square, Ulaanbaatar
Referees: Gonzalo Paz Chiapponi (URU), Shi Qirong (CHN)

26 June 2025
13:05

Boxscore

Australia	21–19	Madagascar
Pts: Stith 7		Pts: Solondrainy 7

Sükhbaatar Square, Ulaanbaatar
Referees: Shi Qirong (CHN), Alex Talisainen (EST)

26 June 2025
14:30

Boxscore

Serbia	21–9	Germany
Pts: Majstorović 9		Pts: Giessmann 4

Sükhbaatar Square, Ulaanbaatar
Referees: Gonzalo Paz Chiapponi (URU), Alex Talisainen (EST)

=== Pool B ===
Pos	Team	Pld	W	L	PF	PA	PR	Qualification
1	United States	4	4	0	84	62	1.355	Quarterfinals
2	Latvia	4	3	1	81	68	1.191	Round of 16
3	Japan	4	2	2	70	77	0.909	Round of 16
4	Montenegro	4	1	3	61	78	0.782	
5	Mongolia (H)	4	0	4	69	81	0.852	

Source: FIBA
Rules for classification: 1) Wins; 2) Head-to-head record; 3) Points scored.
(H) Hosts

23 June 2025
19:55

Boxscore

United States	21–14	Japan
Pts: Travis 10		Pts: Ozawa 9

Sükhbaatar Square, Ulaanbaatar
Referees: Dorothy Okatch (BOT), Alex Talisainen (EST)

23 June 2025
21:10

Boxscore

Latvia	21–16	Montenegro
Pts: Lasmanis 9		Pts: Jovanović 6

Sükhbaatar Square, Ulaanbaatar
Referees: Shi Qirong (CHN), Alex Talisainen (EST)

23 June 2025
21:35

Boxscore

Mongolia	18–21	United States
Pts: Anand 6		Pts: Hahn 7

Sükhbaatar Square, Ulaanbaatar
Referees: Dorothy Okatch (BOT), Vladimir Vesković (SRB)

23 June 2025
22:50

Boxscore

Japan	21–15	Montenegro
Pts: Ozawa 13		Pts: Ivanović 9

Sükhbaatar Square, Ulaanbaatar
Referees: Shi Qirong (CHN), Vladimir Vesković (SRB)

23 June 2025
23:15

Boxscore

Latvia	21–16	Mongolia
Pts: Gludītis 16		Pts: Delgernyam 6

Sükhbaatar Square, Ulaanbaatar
Referees: Dorothy Okatch (BOT), Vladimir Vesković (SRB)

25 June 2025
16:45

Boxscore

United States	21–18	Latvia
Pts: Travis 7		Pts: Miezis 10

Sükhbaatar Square, Ulaanbaatar
Referees: Shi Qirong (CHN), Vladimir Vesković (SRB)

25 June 2025
18:00

Boxscore

Montenegro	18–15	Mongolia
Pts: Ivanović 11		Pts: Delgernyam 7

Sükhbaatar Square, Ulaanbaatar
Referees: Brigitta Csabai-Kaskötő (HUN), Shi Qirong (CHN)

25 June 2025
18:25

Boxscore

Japan	14–21	Latvia
Pts: Ozawa 9		Pts: Miezis 8

Sükhbaatar Square, Ulaanbaatar
Referees: Brigitta Csabai-Kaskötő (HUN), Vladimir Vesković (SRB)

25 June 2025
19:50

Boxscore

Montenegro	12–21	United States
Pts: Ivanović 7		Pts: Travis 13

Sükhbaatar Square, Ulaanbaatar
Referees: Brigitta Csabai-Kaskötő (HUN), Vladimir Vesković (SRB)

25 June 2025
20:15

Boxscore

Mongolia	20–21	Japan
Pts: Delgernyam, Enkhbaatar 8		Pts: Ozawa 15

Sükhbaatar Square, Ulaanbaatar
Referees: Gonzalo Paz Chiapponi (URU), Shi Qirong (CHN)

=== Pool C ===
Pos	Team	Pld	W	L	PF	PA	PR	Qualification
1	China	4	3 (Note: China 21–17 Puerto Rico)	1	77	74	1.041	Quarterfinals
2	Puerto Rico	4	3	1	81	68	1.191	Round of 16
3	Austria	4	2	2	69	71	0.972	Round of 16
4	France	4	1 (Note: Canada 18–21 France)	3	68	75	0.907	
5	Canada	4	1	3	76	83	0.916	

Source: FIBA
Rules for classification: 1) Wins; 2) Head-to-head record; 3) Points scored.
Notes:

24 June 2025
14:55

Boxscore

Austria	19–22	Canada
Pts: Blazan, Linortner 8		Pts: Audu, Desrosiers 7

Sükhbaatar Square, Ulaanbaatar
Referees: Deanna Jackson (USA), Alex Talisainen (EST)

24 June 2025
17:10

Boxscore

China	21–17	Puerto Rico
Pts: Zhang 10		Pts: Ralat 6

Sükhbaatar Square, Ulaanbaatar
Referees: Gonzalo Paz Chiapponi (URU), Vladimir Vesković (SRB)

24 June 2025
17:35

Boxscore

France	13–17	Austria
Pts: Wilson 6		Pts: Blazan 9

Sükhbaatar Square, Ulaanbaatar
Referees: Brigitta Csabai-Kaskötő (HUN), Vladimir Vesković (SRB)

24 June 2025
19:00

Boxscore

Canada	20–22	China
Pts: Desrosiers 9		Pts: Zhang 10

Sükhbaatar Square, Ulaanbaatar
Referees: Dorothy Okatch (BOT), Vladimir Vesković (SRB)

24 June 2025
19:25

Boxscore

France	18–22	Puerto Rico
Pts: Wilson 6		Pts: Ralat 13

Sükhbaatar Square, Ulaanbaatar
Referees: Gonzalo Paz Chiapponi (URU), Brigitta Csabai-Kaskötő (HUN)

26 June 2025
14:55

Boxscore

Puerto Rico	21–12	Austria
Pts: Ralat 12		Pts: Diggs 7

Sükhbaatar Square, Ulaanbaatar
Referees: Brigitta Csabai-Kaskötõ (HUN), Gonzalo Paz Chiapponi (URU)

26 June 2025
17:10

Boxscore

Canada	18–21	France
Pts: Audu, Rhooms 8		Pts: Wilson 11

Sükhbaatar Square, Ulaanbaatar
Referees: Deanna Jackson (USA), Vladimir Vesković (SRB)

26 June 2025
17:35

Boxscore

Austria	21–17	China
Pts: Diggs 11		Pts: Guo 7

Sükhbaatar Square, Ulaanbaatar
Referees: Dorothy Okatch (BOT), Vladimir Vesković (SRB)

26 June 2025
19:00

Boxscore

Puerto Rico	21–17	Canada
Pts: Ralat 11		Pts: Desrosiers 8

Sükhbaatar Square, Ulaanbaatar
Referees: Najib Chajiddine (FRA), Deanna Jackson (USA)

26 June 2025
19:25

Boxscore

China	18–16	France
Pts: Guo 8		Pts: Seguela 9

Sükhbaatar Square, Ulaanbaatar
Referees: Deanna Jackson (USA), Vladimir Vesković (SRB)

=== Pool D ===
Pos	Team	Pld	W	L	PF	PA	PR	Qualification
1	Switzerland	4	3 (Note: Netherlands 15–16 Switzerland)	1	65	67	0.970	Quarterfinals
2	Netherlands	4	3	1	77	70	1.100	Round of 16
3	Spain	4	2	2	77	68	1.132	Round of 16
4	Lithuania	4	1 (Note: Lithuania 21–18 Great Britain)	3	69	76	0.908	
5	Great Britain	4	1	3	74	81	0.914	

Source: FIBA
Rules for classification: 1) Wins; 2) Head-to-head record; 3) Points scored.
Notes:

23 June 2025
11:50

Boxscore

Spain	21–12	Switzerland
Pts: Aurrecoechea 10		Pts: N. Jurkovitz 6

Sükhbaatar Square, Ulaanbaatar
Referees: Gonzalo Paz Chiapponi (URU), Brigitta Csabai-Kaskötő (HUN)

23 June 2025
12:15

Boxscore

Great Britain	19–20	Netherlands
Pts: Lautier-Ogunleye 8		Pts: Van der Horst 8

Sükhbaatar Square, Ulaanbaatar
Referees: Najib Chajiddine (FRA), Deanna Jackson (USA)

23 June 2025
13:40

Boxscore

Lithuania	14–21	Spain
Pts: Januševičius 7		Pts: Aurrecoechea 11

Sükhbaatar Square, Ulaanbaatar
Referees: Najib Chajiddine (FRA), Gonzalo Paz Chiapponi (URU)

23 June 2025
14:05

Boxscore

Switzerland	21–16	Great Britain
Pts: Kazadi 9		Pts: Lautier-Ogunleye 11

Sükhbaatar Square, Ulaanbaatar
Referees: Brigitta Csabai-Kaskötő (HUN), Deanna Jackson (USA)

23 June 2025
19:30

Boxscore

Netherlands	21–19	Lithuania
Pts: De Jong 9		Pts: Pukelis 7

Sükhbaatar Square, Ulaanbaatar
Referees: Shi Qirong (CHN), Vladimir Vesković (SRB)

25 June 2025
11:50

Boxscore

Lithuania	21–18	Great Britain
Pts: Januševičius 11		Pts: Lautier-Ogunleye 9

Sükhbaatar Square, Ulaanbaatar
Referees: Deanna Jackson (USA), Alex Talisainen (EST)

25 June 2025
12:15

Boxscore

Netherlands	15–16	Switzerland
Pts: De Jong 8		Pts: Dubas 6

Sükhbaatar Square, Ulaanbaatar
Referees: Najib Chajiddine (FRA), Deanna Jackson (USA)

25 June 2025
13:40

Boxscore

Great Britain	21–19	Spain
Pts: Lautier-Ogunleye 12		Pts: Aurrecoechea 8

Sükhbaatar Square, Ulaanbaatar
Referees: Najib Chajiddine (FRA), Deanna Jackson (USA)

25 June 2025
14:05

Boxscore

Switzerland	16–15	Lithuania
Pts: N. Jurkovitz 5		Pts: Pukelis 9

Sükhbaatar Square, Ulaanbaatar
Referees: Dorothy Okatch (BOT), Alex Talisainen (EST)

25 June 2025
16:20

Boxscore

Spain	16–21	Netherlands
Pts: Aurrecoechea 7		Pts: De Jong 8

Sükhbaatar Square, Ulaanbaatar
Referees: Gonzalo Paz Chiapponi (URU), Brigitta Csabai-Kaskötő (HUN)

== Knockout stage ==
=== Bracket ===
Round of 16
27 June
Puerto Rico	22
Japan	14
27 June
Latvia	21
Austria	18
27 June
Australia	10
Spain	21
27 June
Netherlands	18
Germany	19

Quarter-finals
28 June
Serbia	20
Puerto Rico	19
28 June
Latvia	15
Switzerland	21
28 June
China	16
Spain	21
28 June
Germany	22
United States	14

Semi-finals
29 June
Serbia	11
Switzerland	21
29 June
Spain	21
Germany	15

Final
29 June
Switzerland	17
Spain	21
Third place
29 June
Serbia	21
Germany	16

=== Round of 16 ===
27 June 2025
17:00

Boxscore

Puerto Rico	22–14	Japan
Pts: Allende 8		Pts: Ozawa 7

Sükhbaatar Square, Ulaanbaatar
Referees: Najib Chajiddine (FRA), Gonzalo Paz Chiapponi (URU)

27 June 2025
17:25

Boxscore

Latvia	21–18	Austria
Pts: Lasmanis 7		Pts: Diggs 9

Sükhbaatar Square, Ulaanbaatar
Referees: Brigitta Csabai-Kaskötő (HUN), Vladimir Vesković (SRB)

27 June 2025
19:00

Boxscore

Australia	10–21	Spain
Pts: Antonio 5		Pts: Martínez 9

Sükhbaatar Square, Ulaanbaatar
Referees: Shi Qirong (CHN), Vladimir Vesković (SRB)

27 June 2025
19:25

Boxscore

Netherlands	18–19	Germany
Pts: Van der Horst 7		Pts: Giessmann 9

Sükhbaatar Square, Ulaanbaatar
Referees: Deanna Jackson (USA), Alex Talisainen (EST)

=== Quarterfinals ===
28 June 2025
18:00

Boxscore

Serbia	20–19	Puerto Rico
Pts: three players 6		Pts: Ralat 9

Sükhbaatar Square, Ulaanbaatar
Referees: Najib Chajiddine (FRA), Deanna Jackson (USA)

28 June 2025
18:25

Boxscore

Latvia	15–21	Switzerland
Pts: Lasmanis 6		Pts: N. Jurkovitz, T. Jurkovitz 6

Sükhbaatar Square, Ulaanbaatar
Referees: Shi Qirong (CHN), Alex Talisainen (EST)

28 June 2025
20:20

Boxscore

China	16–21	Spain
Pts: Zhang 8		Pts: Expósito 7

Sükhbaatar Square, Ulaanbaatar
Referees: Najib Chajiddine (FRA), Gonzalo Paz Chiapponi (URU)

28 June 2025
20:45

Boxscore

Germany	22–14	United States
Pts: Agyeman 8		Pts: Parrott 5

Sükhbaatar Square, Ulaanbaatar
Referees: Brigitta Csabai-Kaskötő (HUN), Vladimir Vesković (SRB)

=== Semifinals ===
29 June 2025
18:00

Boxscore

Serbia	11–21	Switzerland
Pts: Barać 4		Pts: Dubas 9

Sükhbaatar Square, Ulaanbaatar
Referees: Najib Chajiddine (FRA), Deanna Jackson (USA)

29 June 2025
18:25

Boxscore

Spain	21–15	Germany
Pts: Expósito 7		Pts: Fertig 8

Sükhbaatar Square, Ulaanbaatar
Referees: Gonzalo Paz Chiapponi (URU), Alex Talisainen (EST)

=== Third place game ===
29 June 2025
19:25

Boxscore

Serbia	21–16	Germany
Pts: Branković, Majstorović 9		Pts: Giessmann 7

Sükhbaatar Square, Ulaanbaatar
Referees: Najib Chajiddine (FRA), Gonzalo Paz Chiapponi (URU)

=== Final ===
29 June 2025
20:25

Boxscore

Switzerland	17–21	Spain
Pts: Kazadi 7		Pts: De Blas 12

Sükhbaatar Square, Ulaanbaatar
Referees: Deanna Jackson (USA), Vladimir Vesković (SRB)

== Final ranking ==
Rank	Team	Record
1st place, gold medalist(s)	Spain	6–2
2nd place, silver medalist(s)	Switzerland	5–2
3rd place, bronze medalist(s)	Serbia	5–2
4	Germany	5–3
5	United States	4–1
6	Puerto Rico	4–2
7	Latvia	4–2
8	China	3–2
9	Netherlands	3–2
10	Australia	3–2
11	Austria	2–3
12	Japan	2–3
13	Canada	1–3
14	Great Britain	1–3
15	Belgium	1–3
16	Lithuania	1–3
17	France	1–3
18	Montenegro	1–3
19	Mongolia	0–4
20	Madagascar	0–4

== Statistics and awards ==
=== Statistical leaders ===
Name	Points
(Puerto Rico) Antonio Ralat	51
(Spain) Iván Aurrecoechea	49
(Japan) Ryo Ozawa	46
(Germany) Fabian Giessmann	43
(Serbia) Dejan Majstorović	42

=== Awards ===
The awards were announced on 29 June 2025.

All-Star team
(Spain) Guim Expósito
(Switzerland) Natan Jurkovitz
(Serbia) Strahinja Stojačić
MVP
(Spain) Guim Expósito
