= 2023 FIBA 3x3 Asia Cup =

Basketball tournament in Singapore

Tournament information
- Sport: 3x3 Basketball
- Location: Singapore
- Dates: 29 March–2 April
- Host: Singapore
- Venue: Singapore Sports Hub OCBC Square
- Website: fiba3x3.basketball/2023/asiacup

Final positions
- Champions: M: Mongolia (2nd title); W: Australia (3rd title)
- Runner-up: M: Australia; W: New Zealand
- 3rd place: M: New Zealand; W: China
- MVP: M: Davaasambuugiin Delgernyam; W: Marena Whittle

The 2023 FIBA 3x3 Asia Cup was the sixth edition of the FIBA 3x3 Asia Cup. There were 80 games that were played in 2023, with half in the qualification draw and the other half in the main draw. The men and women's champions won a spot at one of the qualifying tournaments for the 2024 Paris Olympics. It is estimated that over 5,000 spectators watched the event at the Singapore Sports Hub OCBC Square, with tickets costing $5.

== Main tournaments ==
=== Men's ===
Pool A

- Mongolia
- Singapore
- Chinese Taipei

Pool B

- Japan
- Australia
- New Zealand

Pool C

- China
- India
- Kazakhstan

Pool D

- Philippines
- Qatar
- Iran

=== Women's ===
Pool A

- China
- Iran
- Philippines

Pool B

- Japan
- Chinese Taipei
- Singapore

Pool C

- Mongolia
- Malaysia
- New Zealand

Pool D

- Thailand
- Australia
- India

== Medalists ==
Event	Gold	Silver	Bronze
Men's team Details	Mongolia; Ariunboldyn Anand; Davaasambuugiin Delgernyam; Enkhbat Dulguun; Onolbaataryn Enkhbaatar	Australia; Todd Blanchfield; Daniel Johnson; Andrew Steel; Lucas Walker	New Zealand; Dominique Kelman-Poto; Christopher McIntosh; Richard Rodger; Tai Wynyard
Women's team Details	Australia; Anneli Maley; Lauren Mansfield; Marena Whittle; Alex Wilson	New Zealand; Lauryn Hippolite; Krystal Leger-Walker; Esra McGoldrick; Sharne Pupuke-Robati	China; Chen Yujie; Zhang Jianping; Zhang Lingge; Zhang Yi

== Men's tournament ==
=== Preliminary round ===
==== Group A ====
Pos	Team	Pld	W	L	PF	PA	PD	Qualification	(Mongolia)	(Singapore)	(Chinese Taipei)
1	Mongolia	2	2	0	43	28	+15	Qualification to knockout stage	—	22–9	21–19
2	Singapore	2	1	1	31	42	−11	Qualification to knockout stage	9–22	—	22–20
3	Chinese Taipei	2	0	2	39	43	−4		19–21	20–22	—

Source: FIBA

==== Group B ====
Pos	Team	Pld	W	L	PF	PA	PD	Qualification	(Australia)	(New Zealand)	(Japan)
1	Australia	2	2	0	42	26	+16	Qualification to knockout stage	—	21–13	21–13
2	New Zealand	2	1	1	34	31	+3	Qualification to knockout stage	13–21	—	21–10
3	Japan	2	0	2	23	42	−19		13–21	10–21	—

Source: FIBA

==== Group C ====
Pos	Team	Pld	W	L	PF	PA	PD	Qualification	(China)	(Kazakhstan)	(India)
1	China	2	2	0	43	27	+16	Qualification to knockout stage	—	22–14	21–13
2	Kazakhstan	2	1	1	35	35	0	Qualification to knockout stage	14–22	—	21–13
3	India	2	0	2	26	42	−16		13–21	13–21	—

Source: FIBA

==== Group D ====
Pos	Team	Pld	W	L	PF	PA	PD	Qualification	(Iran)	(Qatar)	(Philippines)
1	Iran	2	2	0	35	30	+5	Qualification to knockout stage	—	21–19	14–11
2	Qatar	2	1	1	40	39	+1	Qualification to knockout stage	19–21	—	21–18
3	Philippines	2	0	2	29	35	−6		11–14	18–21	—

Source: FIBA

=== Knockout round ===
Quarter-finals
2 April – 14:35
Mongolia	21
Kazakhstan	11
2 April – 15:00
Iran	18
New Zealand	20
2 April – 12:30
Australia	16
Qatar	13
2 April – 12:55
China	21
Singapore	14

Semi-finals
2 April – 17:40
Mongolia	19
New Zealand	18
2 April – 17:15
Australia	18
China	17

Final
2 April – 19:45
Mongolia	21
Australia	18
Third place
2 April – 18:55
New Zealand	21
China	13

== Women's tournament ==
=== Preliminary round ===
==== Group A ====
Pos	Team	Pld	W	L	PF	PA	PD	Qualification	(China)	(Philippines)	(Iran)
1	China	2	2	0	40	22	+18	Qualification to knockout stage	—	19–10	21–12
2	Philippines	2	1	1	26	33	−7	Qualification to knockout stage	10–19	—	16–14
3	Iran	2	0	2	26	37	−11		12–21	14–16	—

Source: FIBA

==== Group B ====
Pos	Team	Pld	W	L	PF	PA	PD	Qualification	(Japan)	(Chinese Taipei)	(Singapore)
1	Japan	2	2	0	30	15	+15	Qualification to knockout stage	—	15–10	15–5
2	Chinese Taipei	2	1	1	26	27	−1	Qualification to knockout stage	10–15	—	16–12
3	Singapore	2	0	2	17	31	−14		5–15	12–16	—

Source: FIBA

==== Group C ====
Pos	Team	Pld	W	L	PF	PA	PD	Qualification	(New Zealand)	(Mongolia)	(Malaysia)
1	New Zealand	2	2	0	38	15	+23	Qualification to knockout stage	—	17–10	21–5
2	Mongolia	2	1	1	31	25	+6	Qualification to knockout stage	10–17	—	21–8
3	Malaysia	2	0	2	13	42	−29		5–21	8–21	—

Source: FIBA

==== Group D ====
Pos	Team	Pld	W	L	PF	PA	PD	Qualification	(Australia)	(Thailand)	(India)
1	Australia	2	2	0	42	20	+22	Qualification to knockout stage	—	21–9	21–11
2	Thailand	2	1	1	25	25	0	Qualification to knockout stage	9–21	—	16–4
3	India	2	0	2	15	37	−22		11–21	4–16	—

Source: FIBA

=== Knockout round ===
Quarter-finals
2 April – 13:45
China	17
Mongolia	10
2 April – 14:10
Australia	21
Chinese Taipei	4
2 April – 11:40
Japan	16
Thailand	17
2 April – 12:05
New Zealand	17
Philippines	10

Semi-finals
2 April – 16:50
China	6
Australia	21
2 April – 16:25
Thailand	8
New Zealand	21

Final
2 April – 19:20
Australia	21
New Zealand	11
Third place
2 April – 18:30
China	11
Thailand	9

== See also ==
- FIBA
- FIBA Asia
