= 2025 FIBA 3x3 World Cup =

International 3x3 basketball event in Mongolia

2025 оны ФИБА 3x3 Дэлхийн цом

Tournament details
- Host country: Mongolia
- City: Ulaanbaatar
- Dates: 23–29 June
- Teams: 40 (from 5 confederations)
- Venue: 1 (in 1 host city)

The 2025 FIBA 3x3 World Cup was an international 3x3 basketball event that featured competitions for men's and women's national teams. The tournament ran between 23 and 29 June 2025 in Ulaanbaatar, Mongolia.

== Medal summary ==
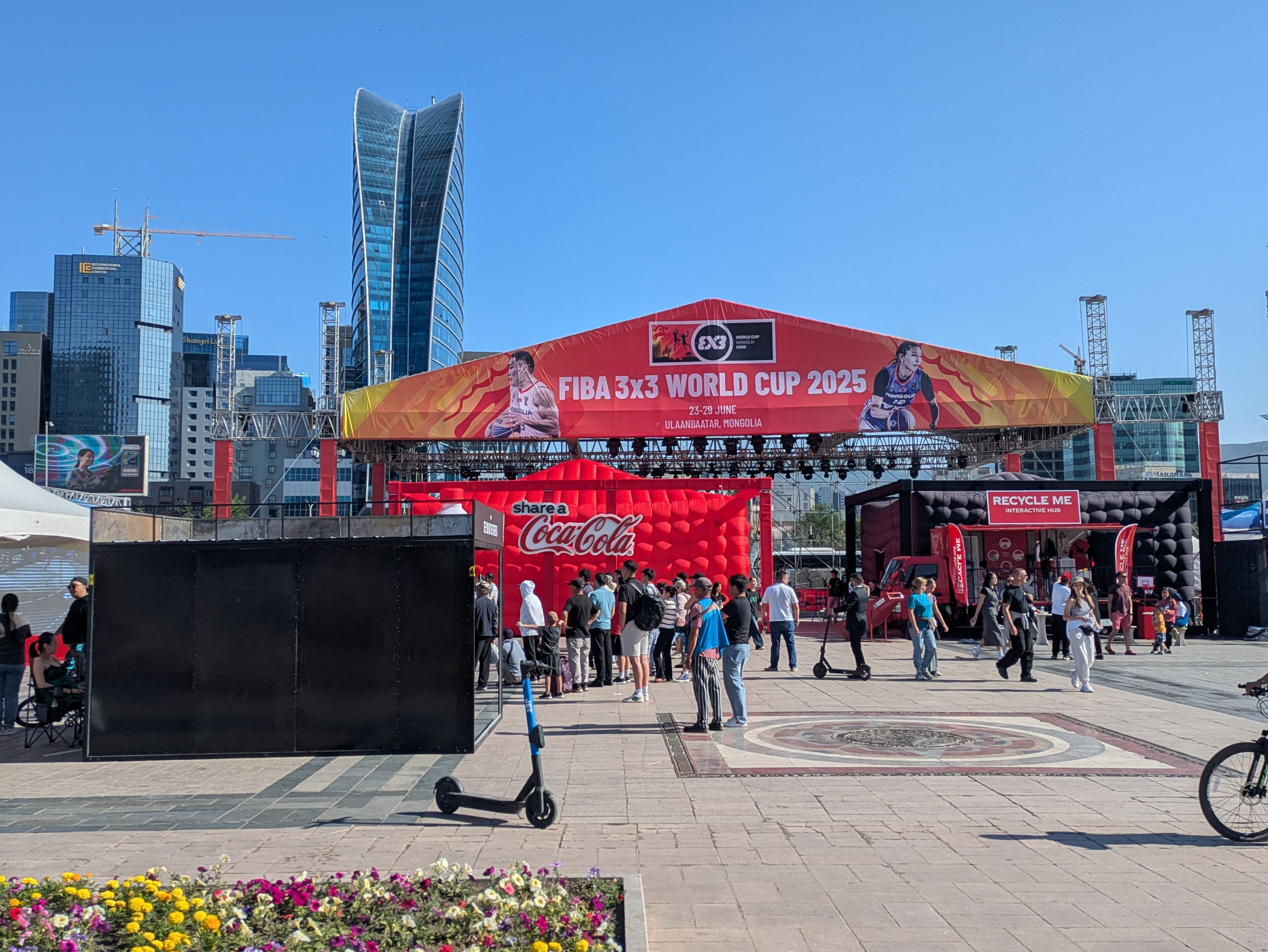
Main stage in Sükhbaatar Square, Ulaanbaatar

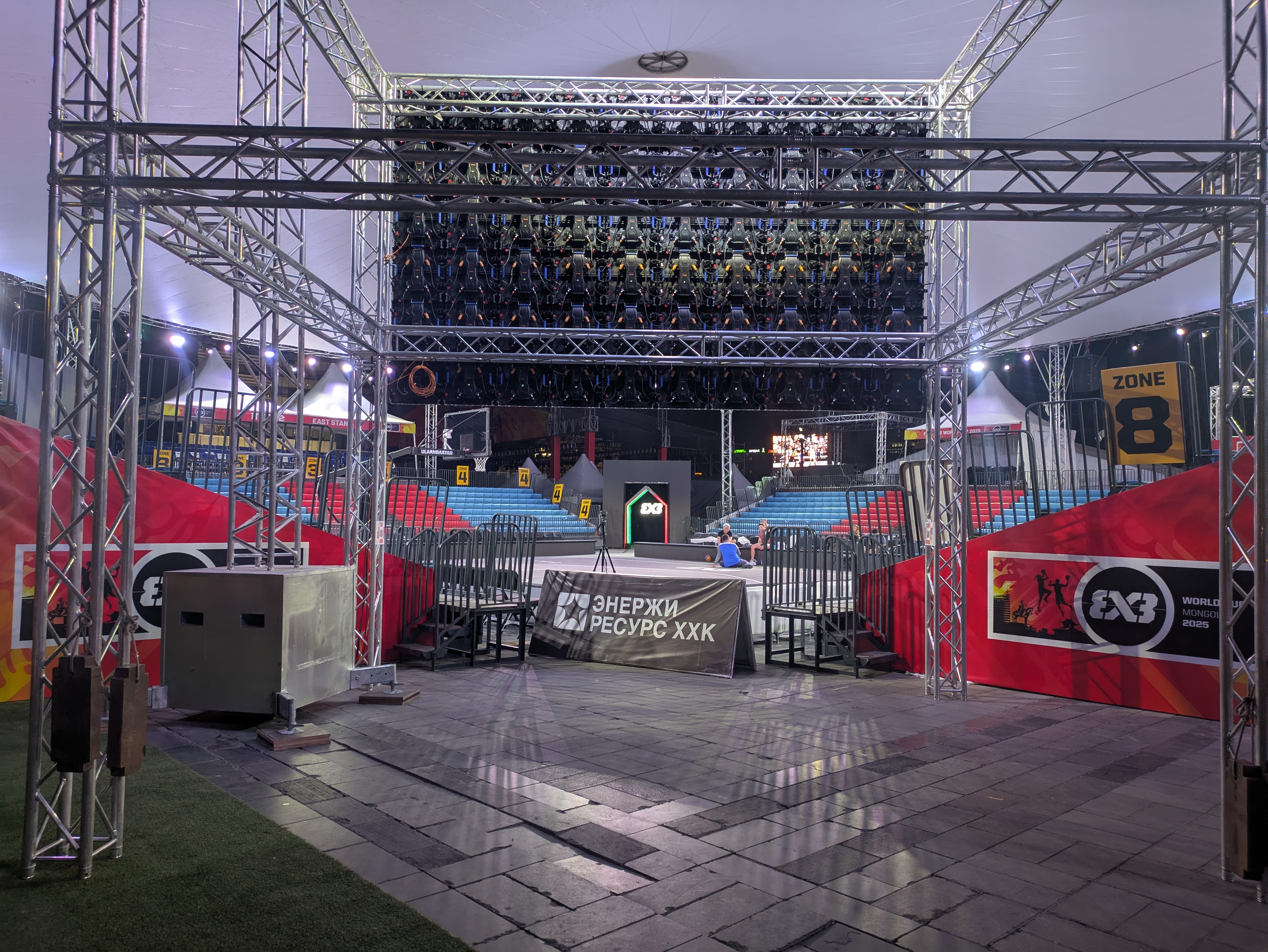
Court at night

=== Medal table ===
* Host nation (Mongolia)

Rank	Nation	Gold	Silver	Bronze	Total
1	Netherlands	1	0	0	1
1	Spain	1	0	0	1
3	Mongolia	0	1	0	1
3	Switzerland	0	1	0	1
5	Canada	0	0	1	1
5	Serbia	0	0	1	1
Totals (6 entries)		2	2	2	6

=== Medalists ===
Event	Gold	Silver	Bronze
Men	Spain; Iván Aurrecoechea; Diego de Blas; Guim Expósito; Carlos Martínez	Switzerland; Jonathan Dubas; Natan Jurkovitz; Thomas Jurkovitz; Jonathan Kazadi	Serbia; Nemanja Barać; Marko Branković; Dejan Majstorović; Strahinja Stojačić
Women	Netherlands; Janis Boonstra; Noortje Driessen; Ilse Kuijt; Evelien Lutje Schipholt	Mongolia; Bat-Erdeniin Ariuntsetseg; Mönkhsaikhany Tserenlkham; Nyamjavyn Nandinkhüsel; Onolbaataryn Khulan	Canada; Kacie Bosch; Cassandra Brown; Paige Crozon; Saicha Grant-Allen
