= 3x3 basketball at the 2012 Asian Beach Games =

- Venue: Fengxiang Beach
- Dates: 17–19 June 2012

3x3 basketball at the 2012 Asian Beach Games was held from 17 June to 19 June 2012 in Haiyang, China.

== Medalists ==
Event	Gold	Silver	Bronze
Men	Afghanistan; Nafi Mashriqi; Billal Azizi; Mostafa Asefi; Shikaeb Rahi Soratgar	Turkmenistan; Toýly Baýryýew; Aleksandr Paşkow; Igor Mazurow; Pawel Awerýanow	Mongolia; Otgonbaataryn Sergelen; Tsetsgeegiin Mergen; Shiinengiin Sedbazar; Davaasambuugiin Delgernyam
Women	India; Geethu Anna Jose; Anitha Pauldurai; Shireen Limaye; Kiranjit Kaur	China; Chen Hong; Wang Siyu; Zhang Xu; Dilana Dilixiati	Philippines; Analyn Almazan; Allana Lim; Melissa Jacob; Ewon Arayi

== Medal table ==
Rank	Nation	Gold	Silver	Bronze	Total
1	Afghanistan (AFG)	1	0	0	1
1	India (IND)	1	0	0	1
3	China (CHN)	0	1	0	1
3	Turkmenistan (TKM)	0	1	0	1
5	Mongolia (MGL)	0	0	1	1
5	Philippines (PHI)	0	0	1	1
Totals (6 entries)		2	2	2	6

== Results ==
=== Men ===
==== Preliminary round ====
===== Group A =====
Pos	Team	Pld	W	L	PF	PA	PD	Pts
1	Mongolia	3	2	1	45	37	+8	5
2	Thailand	3	2	1	34	30	+4	5
3	Qatar	3	2	1	45	47	−2	5
4	Bhutan	3	0	3	41	51	−10	3

Source: OCA

17 June
10:00

Mongolia	21–15	Bhutan
Pts: Sergelen 12		Pts: Tshering 6

Fengxiang Beach, Haiyang
Referees: Wang Xiaochun (CHN)

17 June
10:00

Qatar	14–13	Thailand
Pts: Amin 9		Pts: Kruatiwa 6

Fengxiang Beach, Haiyang
Referees: Duan Zhu (CHN)

17 June
14:00

Thailand	6–4	Mongolia
Pts: Klahan 4		Pts: Sedbazar 2

Fengxiang Beach, Haiyang
Referees: Du Xiyuan (CHN)

17 June
14:00

Bhutan	14–15	Qatar
Pts: Wangchuk 8		Pts: Amin 9

Fengxiang Beach, Haiyang
Referees: Song Yanping (CHN)

18 June
10:00

Qatar	16–20	Mongolia
Pts: Amin 8		Pts: Sedbazar, Delgernyam 10

Fengxiang Beach, Haiyang
Referees: Ng Cheng Hou (MAS)

18 June
10:00

Thailand	15–12	Bhutan
Pts: Dasom 6		Pts: Wangchuk 7

Fengxiang Beach, Haiyang
Referees: Li Ping (CHN)

===== Group B =====
Pos	Team	Pld	W	L	PF	PA	PD	Pts
1	Afghanistan	3	3	0	57	28	+29	6
2	Turkmenistan	3	2	1	45	41	+4	5
3	Nepal	3	1	2	39	46	−7	4
4	Palestine	3	0	3	30	56	−26	3

Source: OCA

17 June
10:30

Turkmenistan	8–17	Afghanistan
Pts: Baýryýew, Mazurow 3		Pts: Azizi 7

Fengxiang Beach, Haiyang
Referees: Song Yanping (CHN)

17 June
10:30

Palestine	9–16	Nepal
Pts: Aburahal, Deyazada 4		Pts: Maharjan 9

Fengxiang Beach, Haiyang
Referees: Li Ping (CHN)

17 June
14:30

Nepal	13–18	Turkmenistan
Pts: Pradhan 12		Pts: Baýryýew, Paşkow 6

Fengxiang Beach, Haiyang
Referees: Duan Zhu (CHN)

17 June
14:30

Afghanistan	21–10	Palestine
Pts: Asefi 10		Pts: Aburahal 6

Fengxiang Beach, Haiyang
Referees: Liang Bin (CHN)

18 June
10:30

Palestine	11–19	Turkmenistan
Pts: Murad 5		Pts: Baýryýew 12

Fengxiang Beach, Haiyang
Referees: Du Xiyuan (CHN)

18 June
10:30

Nepal	10–19	Afghanistan
Pts: Maharjan 4		Pts: Azizi 10

Fengxiang Beach, Haiyang
Referees: Ho Chin Who (MAS)

===== Group C =====
Pos	Team	Pld	W	L	PF	PA	PD	Pts
1	India	3	3	0	56	24	+32	6
2	Bangladesh	3	2	1	40	44	−4	5
3	China	3	1	2	47	50	−3	4
4	Vietnam	3	0	3	32	57	−25	3

Source: OCA

17 June
11:00

Vietnam	4–21	India
Pts: Nguyễn 4		Pts: Y. Singh 9

Fengxiang Beach, Haiyang
Referees: Yuen Chun Yip (HKG)

17 June
11:00

China	15–16	Bangladesh
Pts: Yan 7		Pts: Rasheduzzaman 10

Fengxiang Beach, Haiyang
Referees: Ho Chin Who (MAS)

17 June
15:00

Bangladesh	18–12	Vietnam
Pts: Biswas 10		Pts: Nguyễn 6

Fengxiang Beach, Haiyang
Referees: Ng Cheng Hou (MAS)

17 June
15:00

India	18–14	China
Pts: Y. Singh 9		Pts: Zuo 6

Fengxiang Beach, Haiyang
Referees: Jamal Al-Turk (SYR)

18 June
11:00

China	18–16	Vietnam
Pts: Shi 9		Pts: Lê 9

Fengxiang Beach, Haiyang
Referees: Jamal Al-Turk (SYR)

18 June
11:00

Bangladesh	6–17	India
Pts: Rasheduzzaman 3		Pts: Bhriguvanshi 8

Fengxiang Beach, Haiyang
Referees: Yuen Chun Yip (HKG)

==== Main round ====
===== Group E =====
Pos	Team	Pld	W	L	PF	PA	PD	Pts
1	Turkmenistan	2	1	1	28	22	+6	3
2	Mongolia	2	1	1	26	26	0	3
3	India	2	1	1	30	36	−6	3

Source: OCA

19 June
9:00

Mongolia	10–8	Turkmenistan
Pts: Delgernyam 5		Pts: Baýryýew 5

Fengxiang Beach, Haiyang
Referees: Ho Chin Who (MAS)

19 June
10:00

Turkmenistan	20–12	India
Pts: Mazurow 12		Pts: Bhriguvanshi 6

Fengxiang Beach, Haiyang
Referees: Ng Cheng Hou (MAS)

19 June
11:00

India	18–16	Mongolia
Pts: J. Singh 9		Pts: Sedbazar 11

Fengxiang Beach, Haiyang
Referees: Wang Xiaochun (CHN)

===== Group F =====
Pos	Team	Pld	W	L	PF	PA	PD	Pts
1	Afghanistan	2	2	0	37	25	+12	4
2	Bangladesh	2	1	1	31	31	0	3
3	Thailand	2	0	2	27	39	−12	2

Source: OCA

19 June
9:30

Thailand	13–20	Afghanistan
Pts: Klahan 4		Pts: Asefi 12

Fengxiang Beach, Haiyang
Referees: Jamal Al-Turk (SYR)

19 June
10:30

Afghanistan	17–12	Bangladesh
Pts: Asefi 6		Pts: Sarkar 6

Fengxiang Beach, Haiyang
Referees: Song Yanping (CHN)

19 June
11:30

Bangladesh	19–14	Thailand
Pts: Sarkar 12		Pts: Kaedum, Kruatiwa 4

Fengxiang Beach, Haiyang
Referees: Yuen Chun Yip (HKG)

==== Final round ====
===== Classification 5th–6th =====
19 June
14:30

India	16–8	Thailand
Pts: Bhriguvanshi 6		Pts: Klahan 6

Fengxiang Beach, Haiyang
Referees: Wang Xiaochun (CHN)

===== Bronze medal game =====
19 June
15:30

Mongolia	15–13	Bangladesh
Pts: Sedbazar 7		Pts: Sarkar 6

Fengxiang Beach, Haiyang
Referees: Ng Cheng Hou (MAS)

===== Gold medal game =====
19 June
16:30

Turkmenistan	9–16	Afghanistan
Pts: Baýryýew 5		Pts: Asefi 9

Fengxiang Beach, Haiyang
Referees: Lei Si Man (MAC)

=== Women ===
==== Preliminary round ====
===== Group A =====
Pos	Team	Pld	W	L	PF	PA	PD	Pts
1	India	3	3	0	53	27	+26	6
2	Philippines	3	2	1	40	25	+15	5
3	Thailand	3	1	2	39	33	+6	4
4	Nepal	3	0	3	12	59	−47	3

Source: OCA

17 June
9:00

India	17–12	Thailand
Pts: Jose 10		Pts: Saechua 6

Fengxiang Beach, Haiyang
Referees: Kim Bo-hui (KOR)

17 June
9:00

Nepal	1–20	Philippines
Pts: Sa. Shrestha 1		Pts: Almazan 8

Fengxiang Beach, Haiyang
Referees: Peng Ling (CHN)

17 June
15:30

Thailand	17–5	Nepal
Pts: Chamnarnwaree 9		Pts: Malla 2

Fengxiang Beach, Haiyang
Referees: Tang Jun (CHN)

17 June
15:30

Philippines	9–14	India
Pts: Jacob, Arayi 3		Pts: Pauldurai 6

Fengxiang Beach, Haiyang
Referees: Shi Jing (CHN)

18 June
9:00

India	22–6	Nepal
Pts: Pauldurai 12		Pts: Rai, Sa. Shrestha 2

Fengxiang Beach, Haiyang
Referees: Lei Si Man (MAC)

18 June
9:00

Philippines	11–10	Thailand
Pts: Lim 7		Pts: Banmoo 4

Fengxiang Beach, Haiyang
Referees: Peng Ling (CHN)

===== Group B =====
Pos	Team	Pld	W	L	PF	PA	PD	Pts
1	China	3	3	0	46	17	+29	6
2	Mongolia	3	2	1	29	29	0	5
3	Turkmenistan	3	1	2	25	39	−14	4
4	Maldives	3	0	3	20	35	−15	3

Source: OCA

17 June
9:30

Mongolia	7–15	China
Pts: Ganzul 3		Pts: Zhang 9

Fengxiang Beach, Haiyang
Referees: Lim Sok Hoon (MAS)

17 June
9:30

Maldives	8–13	Turkmenistan
Pts: Shiura 6		Pts: Gokowa 8

Fengxiang Beach, Haiyang
Referees: Lei Si Man (MAC)

17 June
16:00

China	13–4	Maldives
Pts: Dilana 6		Pts: Rasheed 4

Fengxiang Beach, Haiyang
Referees: Kim Bo-hui (KOR)

17 June
16:00

Turkmenistan	6–13	Mongolia
Pts: Nagiýewa 3		Pts: Ganzul 8

Fengxiang Beach, Haiyang
Referees: Lei Si Man (MAC)

18 June
9:30

Mongolia	9–8	Maldives
Pts: Altanzayaa 5		Pts: Shiura 5

Fengxiang Beach, Haiyang
Referees: Kim Bo-hui (KOR)

18 June
9:30

Turkmenistan	6–18	China
Pts: Gokowa 4		Pts: Wang 9

Fengxiang Beach, Haiyang
Referees: Lim Sok Hoon (MAS)

==== Classification 5th–6th ====
19 June
14:00

Thailand	12–6	Turkmenistan
Pts: Banmoo 7		Pts: Gokowa 4

Fengxiang Beach, Haiyang
Referees: Tang Jun (CHN)

==== Final round ====
Semifinals
18 June
India	21
Mongolia	16
18 June
China	10
Philippines	9

Gold medal game
19 June
India	17
China	14
Bronze medal game
19 June
Mongolia	15
Philippines	16

===== Semifinals =====
18 June
14:00

India	21–16	Mongolia
Pts: Jose 14		Pts: Ganzul 12

Fengxiang Beach, Haiyang
Referees: Lei Si Man (MAC)

18 June
14:30

China	10–9	Philippines
Pts: Wang 4		Pts: Lim 4

Fengxiang Beach, Haiyang
Referees: Kim Bo-hui (KOR)

===== Bronze medal game =====
19 June
15:00

Mongolia	15–16	Philippines
Pts: Ganzul 9		Pts: Lim, Arayi 7

Fengxiang Beach, Haiyang
Referees: Peng Ling (CHN)

===== Gold medal game =====
19 June
16:00

India	17–14	China
Pts: Jose 11		Pts: Zhang 9

Fengxiang Beach, Haiyang
Referees: Lei Si Man (MAC)
