= 3x3 basketball at the 2017 Asian Indoor and Martial Arts Games =

- Venue: Ashgabat Basketball Arena
- Dates: 19–24 September 2017

The 3x3 basketball competitions at the 2017 Asian Indoor and Martial Arts Games was held at the 3x3 Basketball Arena Ashgabat from 19 to 24 September 2017.

== Medalists ==
Event	Gold	Silver	Bronze
Men	Qatar; Abdulrahman Saad; Nedim Muslić; Tanguy Ngombo; Erfan Ali Saeed	Iraq; Hassan Ali; Ali Abdullah; Mohammed Salah; Ali Muayad	Mongolia; Enkhbatyn Dölgöön; Gotovyn Tsengüünbayar; Avarzediin Gansükh; Davaasambuugiin Delgernyam
Women	Thailand; Penphan Yothanan; Naruemol Banmoo; Supira Klanbut; Thidaporn Maihom	Uzbekistan; Elena Khusnitdinova; Natalya Koneva; Irina Averyanova; Aliya Samatova	Turkmenistan; Leýla Halilowa; Aýna Gokowa; Nigýara Nagiýewa; Mähri Jumageldiýewa

== Medal table ==
Rank	Nation	Gold	Silver	Bronze	Total
1	Qatar (QAT)	1	0	0	1
1	Thailand (THA)	1	0	0	1
3	Iraq (IRQ)	0	1	0	1
3	Uzbekistan (UZB)	0	1	0	1
5	Mongolia (MGL)	0	0	1	1
5	Turkmenistan (TKM)	0	0	1	1
Totals (6 entries)		2	2	2	6

== Results ==
=== Men ===
==== Preliminary round ====
===== Pool A =====
Pos	Team	Pld	W	L	PF	PA	PD	Pts
1	Mongolia	3	3	0	61	43	+18	6
2	Kyrgyzstan	3	2	1	52	55	−3	5
3	Uzbekistan	3	1	2	52	54	−2	4
4	Nepal	3	0	3	46	59	−13	3

Source: OCA

19 September
18:00

Uzbekistan	18–16	Nepal
Pts: Khayitaliev 6		Pts: S. Shrestha 8

Basketball Arena, Ashgabat
Referees: Ibragimow (TKM), Liu (MAS)

19 September
18:50

Kyrgyzstan	12–22	Mongolia
Pts: Kuranbaev 8		Pts: Tsengüünbayar 10

Basketball Arena, Ashgabat
Referees: Liu (MAS), Rulyov (KAZ)

19 September
20:05

Kyrgyzstan	19–15	Nepal
Pts: Kuranbaev 9		Pts: S. Shrestha 6

Basketball Arena, Ashgabat
Referees: Ibragimow (TKM), Quinn (INA)

19 September
21:20

Mongolia	17–16	Uzbekistan
Pts: Delgernyam 7		Pts: Khegay 6

Basketball Arena, Ashgabat
Referees: Quinn (INA), Rulyov (KAZ)

21 September
18:00

Uzbekistan	18–21	Kyrgyzstan
Pts: Nabiev, Azizov 8		Pts: Kuranbaev 11

Basketball Arena, Ashgabat
Referees: Lim (MAS), Rulyov (KAZ)

21 September
20:05

Nepal	15–22	Mongolia
Pts: S. Shrestha 11		Pts: Dölgöön, Gansükh 6

Basketball Arena, Ashgabat
Referees: Ibragimow (TKM), Shi (CHN)

===== Pool B =====
Pos	Team	Pld	W	L	PF	PA	PD	Pts
1	Iraq	3	2	1	55	43	+12	5
2	Turkmenistan	3	2	1	53	34	+19	5
3	Lebanon	3	2	1	44	46	−2	5
4	Tajikistan	3	0	3	31	60	−29	3

Source: OCA

20 September
18:00

Tajikistan	13–21	Iraq
Pts: Zafari 7		Pts: Muayad 10

Basketball Arena, Ashgabat
Referees: Earle (AUS), Tan (SGP)

20 September
19:15

Turkmenistan	11–17	Lebanon
Pts: Baýryýew 5		Pts: Nemer 9

Basketball Arena, Ashgabat
Referees: Devlin (AUS), Liu (MAS)

20 September
20:30

Turkmenistan	22–4	Tajikistan
Pts: Baýryýew 8		Pts: Umedov, Zafari 2

Basketball Arena, Ashgabat
Referees: Earle (AUS), Quinn (INA)

20 September
21:20

Lebanon	10–21	Iraq
Pts: Bechara 4		Pts: Ali, Abdullah 7

Basketball Arena, Ashgabat
Referees: Liu (MAS), Shi (CHN)

22 September
18:00

Iraq	13–20	Turkmenistan
Pts: Ali 10		Pts: Otbozin 10

Basketball Arena, Ashgabat
Referees: Liu (MAS), Shi (CHN)

22 September
20:05

Tajikistan	14–17	Lebanon
Pts: Zafari 6		Pts: Dib 7

Basketball Arena, Ashgabat
Referees: Devlin (AUS), Quinn (INA)

===== Pool C =====
Pos	Team	Pld	W	L	PF	PA	PD	Pts
1	Qatar	3	3	0	64	28	+36	6
2	Samoa	3	2	1	53	51	+2	5
3	Afghanistan	3	1	2	43	54	−11	4
4	Jordan	3	0	3	32	59	−27	3

Source: OCA

20 September
18:50

Jordan	11–17	Afghanistan
Pts: Shubair 7		Pts: Vadoudi 8

Basketball Arena, Ashgabat
Referees: Ibragimow (TKM), Quinn (INA)

20 September
20:05

Qatar	21–11	Samoa
Pts: Saad 7		Pts: Tufuga 8

Basketball Arena, Ashgabat
Referees: Devlin (AUS), Ibragimow (TKM)

22 September
18:50

Qatar	22–8	Afghanistan
Pts: Ngombo 9		Pts: Mirzad, Ibrahimi 3

Basketball Arena, Ashgabat
Referees: Earle (AUS), Rulyov (KAZ)

22 September
19:15

Samoa	21–12	Jordan
Pts: McFarland 10		Pts: Juha 10

Basketball Arena, Ashgabat
Referees: Ibragimow (TKM), Tan (SGP)

22 September
20:30

Afghanistan	18–21	Samoa
Pts: Mirzad 9		Pts: McFarland 13

Basketball Arena, Ashgabat
Referees: Liu (MAS), Tan (SGP)

22 September
21:20

Jordan	9–21	Qatar
Pts: Juha 6		Pts: Ngombo 11

Basketball Arena, Ashgabat
Referees: Lim (MAS), Rulyov (KAZ)

===== Pool D =====
Pos	Team	Pld	W	L	PF	PA	PD	Pts
1	Thailand	3	3	0	58	40	+18	6
2	Indonesia	3	2	1	58	44	+14	5
3	Chinese Taipei	3	1	2	36	53	−17	4
4	Guam	3	0	3	34	49	−15	3

Source: OCA

19 September
19:15

Chinese Taipei	13–10	Guam
Pts: Wei 5		Pts: Hechanova 5

Basketball Arena, Ashgabat
Referees: Davaadorj (MGL), Earle (AUS)

19 September
20:30

Indonesia	16–21	Thailand
Pts: Pratama 7		Pts: Dasom 8

Basketball Arena, Ashgabat
Referees: Davaadorj (MGL), Ibragimow (TKM)

21 September
18:50

Guam	10–15	Thailand
Pts: Susuico 4		Pts: Dasom 6

Basketball Arena, Ashgabat
Referees: Liu (MAS), Tan (SGP)

21 September
19:15

Chinese Taipei	9–21	Indonesia
Pts: Lin 6		Pts: Pratama, Pangesthio 7

Basketball Arena, Ashgabat
Referees: Devlin (AUS), Earle (AUS)

21 September
20:30

Thailand	22–14	Chinese Taipei
Pts: Jaisanuk 9		Pts: Lin 10

Basketball Arena, Ashgabat
Referees: Davaadorj (MGL), Earle (AUS)

21 September
21:20

Indonesia	21–14	Guam
Pts: Pangesthio 16		Pts: Hechanova 7

Basketball Arena, Ashgabat
Referees: Devlin (AUS), Rulyov (KAZ)

==== Knockout round ====
Quarterfinals
23 September
Mongolia	22
Indonesia	10
23 September
Qatar	14
Turkmenistan	12
23 September
Iraq	20
Samoa	17
23 September
Thailand	12
Kyrgyzstan	13

Semifinals
24 September
Mongolia	14
Qatar	15
24 September
Iraq (OT)	20
Kyrgyzstan	18

Gold medal game
24 September
Qatar	22
Iraq	12
Bronze medal game
24 September
Mongolia	21
Kyrgyzstan	11

===== Quarterfinals =====
23 September
19:00

Mongolia	22–10	Indonesia
Pts: Tsengüünbayar 7		Pts: Pratama 6

Basketball Arena, Ashgabat
Referees: Devlin (AUS), Shi (CHN)

23 September
19:30

Qatar	14–12	Turkmenistan
Pts: Saad 13		Pts: Otbozin 6

Basketball Arena, Ashgabat
Referees: Liu (MAS), Quinn (INA)

23 September
21:00

Iraq	20–17	Samoa
Pts: Salah 11		Pts: Tufuga 10

Basketball Arena, Ashgabat
Referees: Quinn (INA), Rulyov (KAZ)

23 September
21:30

Thailand	12–13	Kyrgyzstan
Pts: Jaisanuk, Lakhan 4		Pts: Kuranbaev 7

Basketball Arena, Ashgabat
Referees: Earle (AUS), Ibragimow (TKM)

===== Semifinals =====
24 September
19:00

Mongolia	14–15	Qatar
Pts: Tsengüünbayar 6		Pts: Ngombo 7

Basketball Arena, Ashgabat
Referees: Ibragimow (TKM), Liu (MAS)

24 September
19:30

Iraq	20–18 (OT)	Kyrgyzstan
Pts: Ali 10		Pts: Subanbekov 8

Basketball Arena, Ashgabat
Referees: Earle (AUS), Quinn (INA)

===== Bronze medal game =====
24 September
20:30

Mongolia	21–11	Kyrgyzstan
Pts: Dölgöön 9		Pts: Kuranbaev, Pekhov 5

Basketball Arena, Ashgabat
Referees: Devlin (AUS), Rulyov (KAZ)

===== Gold medal game =====
24 September
21:30

Qatar	22–12	Iraq
Pts: Saeed 11		Pts: Ali 6

Basketball Arena, Ashgabat
Referees: Liu (MAS), Quinn (INA)

=== Women ===
==== Preliminary round ====
===== Pool A =====
Pos	Team	Pld	W	L	PF	PA	PD	Pts
1	Syria	2	2	0	34	22	+12	4
2	Turkmenistan	2	1	1	33	38	−5	3
3	Mongolia	2	0	2	25	32	−7	2

Source: OCA

19 September
18:25

Turkmenistan	14–21	Syria
Pts: Gokowa 6		Pts: Magarian 10

Basketball Arena, Ashgabat
Referees: Davaadorj (MGL), Quinn (INA)

19 September
19:40

Mongolia	8–13	Syria
Pts: Ishtayaa, Ganzul 4		Pts: Magarian 6

Basketball Arena, Ashgabat
Referees: Earle (AUS), Rulyov (KAZ)

19 September
20:55

Turkmenistan	19–17	Mongolia
Pts: Jumageldiýewa 8		Pts: Ganzul 6

Basketball Arena, Ashgabat
Referees: Earle (AUS), Liu (MAS)

===== Pool B =====
Pos	Team	Pld	W	L	PF	PA	PD	Pts
1	Thailand	2	2	0	39	20	+19	4
2	Indonesia	2	1	1	29	23	+6	3
3	Guam	2	0	2	11	36	−25	2

Source: OCA

21 September
18:25

Indonesia	15–5	Guam
Pts: Dewi 8		Pts: Duenas 2

Basketball Arena, Ashgabat
Referees: Ibragimow (TKM), Shi (CHN)

21 September
19:40

Thailand	21–6	Guam
Pts: Yothanan 11		Pts: Duenas 3

Basketball Arena, Ashgabat
Referees: Davaadorj (MGL), Quinn (INA)

21 September
20:55

Indonesia	14–18	Thailand
Pts: Kurniawan 7		Pts: Yothanan 12

Basketball Arena, Ashgabat
Referees: Lim (MAS), Tan (SGP)

===== Pool C =====
Pos	Team	Pld	W	L	PF	PA	PD	Pts
1	Uzbekistan	2	2	0	38	22	+16	4
2	Jordan	2	1	1	29	33	−4	3
3	Cook Islands	2	0	2	26	38	−12	2

Source: OCA

22 September
18:25

Jordan	17–16	Cook Islands
Pts: Al-Assi 7		Pts: A. Lewis 7

Basketball Arena, Ashgabat
Referees: Davaadorj (MGL), Quinn (INA)

22 September
19:40

Uzbekistan	21–10	Cook Islands
Pts: Koneva, Samatova 7		Pts: A. Lewis 4

Basketball Arena, Ashgabat
Referees: Devlin (AUS), Lim (MAS)

22 September
20:55

Jordan	12–17	Uzbekistan
Pts: Najjar 6		Pts: Koneva 6

Basketball Arena, Ashgabat
Referees: Davaadorj (MGL), Shi (CHN)

===== Pool D =====
Pos	Team	Pld	W	L	PF	PA	PD	Pts
1	Iran	2	2	0	37	19	+18	4
2	Chinese Taipei	2	1	1	36	17	+19	3
3	Afghanistan	2	0	2	5	42	−37	2

Source: OCA

20 September
18:25

Iran	21–4	Afghanistan
Pts: Vakili, Artounian 9		Pts: Hotan 2

Basketball Arena, Ashgabat
Referees: Lim (MAS), Shi (CHN)

20 September
19:40

Chinese Taipei	21–1	Afghanistan
Pts: Cheng, Ting 6		Pts: Pardes 1

Basketball Arena, Ashgabat
Referees: Davaadorj (MGL), Rulyov (KAZ)

20 September
20:55

Iran	16–15	Chinese Taipei
Pts: Vakili 8		Pts: Ting 6

Basketball Arena, Ashgabat
Referees: Lim (MAS), Tan (SGP)

==== Knockout round ====
Quarterfinals
23 September
Syria	10
Chinese Taipei	7
23 September
Uzbekistan	17
Indonesia	9
23 September
Thailand	18
Jordan	4
23 September
Iran	7
Turkmenistan	14

Semifinals
24 September
Syria	10
Uzbekistan	22
24 September
Thailand	20
Turkmenistan	11

Gold medal game
24 September
Uzbekistan	20
Thailand (OT)	22
Bronze medal game
24 September
Syria	12
Turkmenistan	15

===== Quarterfinals =====
23 September
18:00

Syria	10–7	Chinese Taipei
Pts: Sulaiman 4		Pts: Tseng, Cheng, Ting 2

Basketball Arena, Ashgabat
Referees: Ibragimow (TKM), Tan (SGP)

23 September
18:30

Uzbekistan	17–9	Indonesia
Pts: Averyanova 8		Pts: Dewi 4

Basketball Arena, Ashgabat
Referees: Lim (MAS), Rulyov (KAZ)

23 September
20:00

Thailand	18–4	Jordan
Pts: Yothanan, Klanbut 5		Pts: Najjar 3

Basketball Arena, Ashgabat
Referees: Davaadorj (MGL), Earle (AUS)

23 September
20:30

Iran	7–14	Turkmenistan
Pts: Mahmoudi 4		Pts: Gokowa, Nagiýewa 4

Basketball Arena, Ashgabat
Referees: Devlin (AUS), Shi (CHN)

===== Semifinals =====
24 September
18:00

Syria	10–22	Uzbekistan
Pts: Magarian 5		Pts: Koneva 9

Basketball Arena, Ashgabat
Referees: Davaadorj (MGL), Rulyov (KAZ)

24 September
18:30

Thailand	20–11	Turkmenistan
Pts: Yothanan 7		Pts: Gokowa, Nagiýewa 5

Basketball Arena, Ashgabat
Referees: Devlin (AUS), Lim (MAS)

===== Bronze medal game =====
24 September
20:00

Syria	12–15	Turkmenistan
Pts: Magarian 9		Pts: Gokowa 5

Basketball Arena, Ashgabat
Referees: Earle (AUS), Tan (SGP)

===== Gold medal game =====
24 September
21:00

Uzbekistan	20–22 (OT)	Thailand
Pts: Koneva 9		Pts: Maihom 9

Basketball Arena, Ashgabat
Referees: Ibragimow (TKM), Shi (CHN)
