= Dragon boat at the 2012 Asian Beach Games =

- Venue: Zone of Flat Water Sports
- Dates: 17–19 June 2012

Dragon boat racing at the 2012 Asian Beach Games was held in Haiyang, China from 17 June to 19 June 2012.

== Medalists ==
=== Men ===
Event	Gold	Silver	Bronze
200 m	Indonesia; Gandi; Asep Hidayat; Jaslin; Marjuki; John Feter Matulessy; Jefklin Mehue; Spens Stuber Mehue; Erwin David Monim; Muchlis; Andri Agus Mulyana; Silo; Rusmin Sina; Sutrisno; Dedi Kurniawan Suyatno; Anwar Tarra; Wardi	Philippines; Jameson Bumahit; Florence Caro; Nelson Cordova; Raquiel Espinosa; Alex Generalo; Ambrocio Gontinas; Alberto Hugo; Rolando Isidro; Hermie Macaranas; Joseph Magno; Diomedes Manalo; Ric Nacional; Ronniel Rafael; Dativo Romares; Ricky Sardena; Alex Sumagaysay	China; Cui Songyun; Guan Xiangting; Hu Weifeng; Huang Chentao; Huang Jianwen; Huang Jisheng; Ji Pinghe; Jiang Tao; Liu Yaosen; Sun Hailong; Tan Shichao; Tan Shipeng; Wei Le; Wu Richang; Yang Zhigang; Zhou Junxiong
500 m	Indonesia; Gandi; Asep Hidayat; Jaslin; Marjuki; John Feter Matulessy; Jefklin Mehue; Spens Stuber Mehue; Erwin David Monim; Muchlis; Andri Agus Mulyana; Silo; Rusmin Sina; Sutrisno; Dedi Kurniawan Suyatno; Anwar Tarra; Wardi	Philippines; Jameson Bumahit; Florence Caro; Nelson Cordova; Raquiel Espinosa; Alex Generalo; Ambrocio Gontinas; Alberto Hugo; Rolando Isidro; Hermie Macaranas; Joseph Magno; Diomedes Manalo; Ric Nacional; Ronniel Rafael; Dativo Romares; Ricky Sardena; Alex Sumagaysay	Thailand; Chaiyakarn Choochuen; Sanchai Chusamrit; Laor Iamluek; Jakkapan Jangsawang; Nares Naoprakon; Buntong Numdokmai; Piyaphan Phaophat; Thotsaporn Pholseth; Kritamete Sattanan; Vinya Seechomchuen; Rungsawan Suansan; Somsong Suebsingkan; Pornchai Tesdee; Nathaworn Waenphrom; Natthawat Waenphrom; Wuttikrai Wongupparee
3000 m	Indonesia; Gandi; Asep Hidayat; Jaslin; Marjuki; John Feter Matulessy; Jefklin Mehue; Spens Stuber Mehue; Erwin David Monim; Muchlis; Andri Agus Mulyana; Silo; Rusmin Sina; Sutrisno; Dedi Kurniawan Suyatno; Anwar Tarra; Wardi	Thailand; Chaiyakarn Choochuen; Sanchai Chusamrit; Laor Iamluek; Jakkapan Jangsawang; Nares Naoprakon; Buntong Numdokmai; Piyaphan Phaophat; Thotsaporn Pholseth; Kritamete Sattanan; Vinya Seechomchuen; Rungsawan Suansan; Somsong Suebsingkan; Pornchai Tesdee; Nathaworn Waenphrom; Natthawat Waenphrom; Wuttikrai Wongupparee	Philippines; Jameson Bumahit; Florence Caro; Nelson Cordova; Raquiel Espinosa; Alex Generalo; Ambrocio Gontinas; Alberto Hugo; Rolando Isidro; Hermie Macaranas; Joseph Magno; Diomedes Manalo; Ric Nacional; Ronniel Rafael; Dativo Romares; Ricky Sardena; Alex Sumagaysay

=== Women ===
Event	Gold	Silver	Bronze
200 m	China; Dong Aili; Fang Jincai; Guan Wangxing; He Pinzhen; He Shuzhen; Huang Yi; Li Lianying; Li Wangxing; Li Yinying; Liang Gekui; Liu Xuelian; Pan Huizhu; Qu Xue; Song Yanbing	Indonesia; Yaulana Amalia; Dayumin; Nikmah Diana; Yulanda Ester Entong; Seni Gantiani; Yunita Kadop; Siti Maryam; Maryati; Masripah; Sesni Lavenia Monim; Nurhalimah; Ririn Nur Paridah; Kanti Santyawati; Vioditha Cristy Sokoy; Since Litashova Yom; Riana Yulistrian	Thailand; Nattakant Boonruang; Jaruwan Chaikan; Nutcharat Chimbanrai; Jariya Kankasikam; Kamonchanok Klinhomhuan; Sirinya Klongjaroen; Pranchalee Moonkasem; Pratumrat Nakuy; Nipaporn Nopsri; Ngamfah Photha; Pattraluck Phumsatan; Nipatcha Pootong; Thanaphon Prasoetpan; Prapaporn Pumkhunthod; Pattaya Sangkumma; Chutikan Thanawanutpong
500 m	China; Dong Aili; Fang Jincai; Guan Wangxing; He Pinzhen; He Shuzhen; Huang Yi; Li Lianying; Li Wangxing; Li Yinying; Liang Gekui; Liu Xuelian; Pan Huizhu; Qu Xue; Song Yanbing	Indonesia; Yaulana Amalia; Dayumin; Nikmah Diana; Yulanda Ester Entong; Seni Gantiani; Yunita Kadop; Siti Maryam; Maryati; Masripah; Sesni Lavenia Monim; Nurhalimah; Ririn Nur Paridah; Kanti Santyawati; Vioditha Cristy Sokoy; Since Litashova Yom; Riana Yulistrian	Thailand; Nattakant Boonruang; Jaruwan Chaikan; Nutcharat Chimbanrai; Jariya Kankasikam; Kamonchanok Klinhomhuan; Sirinya Klongjaroen; Pranchalee Moonkasem; Pratumrat Nakuy; Nipaporn Nopsri; Ngamfah Photha; Pattraluck Phumsatan; Nipatcha Pootong; Thanaphon Prasoetpan; Prapaporn Pumkhunthod; Pattaya Sangkumma; Chutikan Thanawanutpong
3000 m	Indonesia; Yaulana Amalia; Dayumin; Nikmah Diana; Yulanda Ester Entong; Seni Gantiani; Yunita Kadop; Siti Maryam; Maryati; Masripah; Sesni Lavenia Monim; Nurhalimah; Ririn Nur Paridah; Kanti Santyawati; Vioditha Cristy Sokoy; Since Litashova Yom; Riana Yulistrian	China; Dong Aili; Fang Jincai; Guan Wangxing; He Pinzhen; He Shuzhen; Huang Yi; Li Lianying; Li Wangxing; Li Yinying; Liang Gekui; Liu Xuelian; Pan Huizhu; Qu Xue; Song Yanbing	Thailand; Nattakant Boonruang; Jaruwan Chaikan; Nutcharat Chimbanrai; Jariya Kankasikam; Kamonchanok Klinhomhuan; Sirinya Klongjaroen; Pranchalee Moonkasem; Pratumrat Nakuy; Nipaporn Nopsri; Ngamfah Photha; Pattraluck Phumsatan; Nipatcha Pootong; Thanaphon Prasoetpan; Prapaporn Pumkhunthod; Pattaya Sangkumma; Chutikan Thanawanutpong

== Medal table ==
Rank	Nation	Gold	Silver	Bronze	Total
1	Indonesia (INA)	4	2	0	6
2	China (CHN)	2	1	1	4
3	Philippines (PHI)	0	2	1	3
4	Thailand (THA)	0	1	4	5
Totals (4 entries)		6	6	6	18

== Results ==
=== Men ===
==== 200 m ====
18 June

===== Heats =====
Rank	Team	Time
Heat 1
1	Philippines	43.183
2	Thailand	46.102
3	Japan	46.235
4	Hong Kong	50.368
Heat 2
1	Indonesia	43.784
2	China	44.940
3	Vietnam	46.525
4	Macau	50.571

===== Repechages =====
Rank	Team	Time
Heat 1
1	China	46.203
2	Japan	47.162
3	Hong Kong	49.955
Heat 2
1	Thailand	45.602
2	Vietnam	46.948
3	Macau	48.453

===== Finals =====
Rank	Team	Time
Final A
1st place, gold medalist(s)	Indonesia	43.458
2nd place, silver medalist(s)	Philippines	43.992
3rd place, bronze medalist(s)	China	45.076
4	Thailand	1:20.33
Final B
5	Japan	46.739
6	Vietnam	47.913
7	Hong Kong	49.455
8	Macau	49.807

==== 500 m ====
17 June

===== Heats =====
Rank	Team	Time
Heat 1
1	Thailand	1:57.393
2	China	1:58.111
3	Japan	1:59.632
4	Macau	2:11.634
Heat 2
1	Indonesia	1:53.478
2	Philippines	1:55.310
3	Vietnam	2:02.662
4	Hong Kong	2:08.027

===== Repechages =====
Rank	Team	Time
Heat 1
1	Philippines	1:57.675
2	Japan	1:58.855
3	Hong Kong	2:09.312
Heat 2
1	China	2:00.366
2	Vietnam	2:03.288
3	Macau	2:04.318

===== Finals =====
Rank	Team	Time
Final A
1st place, gold medalist(s)	Indonesia	1:52.477
2nd place, silver medalist(s)	Philippines	1:52.927
3rd place, bronze medalist(s)	Thailand	1:54.088
4	China	1:55.667
Final B
5	Japan	2:01.570
6	Vietnam	2:02.608
7	Macau	2:05.807
8	Hong Kong	2:06.012

==== 3000 m ====
19 June

Rank	Team	Time
1st place, gold medalist(s)	Indonesia	13:59.411
2nd place, silver medalist(s)	Thailand	14:01.553
3rd place, bronze medalist(s)	Philippines	14:07.482
4	China	14:16.539
5	Vietnam	14:23.465
6	Japan	14:40.138
7	Macau	16:26.221

=== Women ===
==== 200 m ====
18 June

===== Heats =====
Rank	Team	Time
Heat 1
1	Indonesia	51.559
2	China	54.292
3	Hong Kong	57.620
Heat 2
1	Thailand	52.343
2	Japan	55.253
3	Macau	55.570

===== Repechages =====
Rank	Team	Time
Heat 1
1	China	54.644
2	Macau	56.397
Heat 2
1	Japan	55.618
2	Hong Kong	57.092

===== Finals =====
Rank	Team	Time
Final A
1st place, gold medalist(s)	China	50.265
2nd place, silver medalist(s)	Indonesia	50.533
3rd place, bronze medalist(s)	Thailand	52.632
4	Japan	55.261
Final B
5	Macau	56.158
6	Hong Kong	57.108

==== 500 m ====
17 June

===== Heats =====
Rank	Team	Time
Heat 1
1	Thailand	2:11.825
2	Japan	2:16.497
3	Hong Kong	2:32.181
Heat 2
1	Indonesia	2:09.065
2	China	2:12.167
3	Macau	2:27.224

===== Repechages =====
Rank	Team	Time
Heat 1
1	China	2:18.215
2	Macau	2:21.473
Heat 2
1	Japan	2:16.444
2	Hong Kong	2:22.976

===== Finals =====
Rank	Team	Time
Final A
1st place, gold medalist(s)	China	2:05.830
2nd place, silver medalist(s)	Indonesia	2:08.159
3rd place, bronze medalist(s)	Thailand	2:09.019
4	Japan	2:16.008
Final B
5	Macau	2:21.936
6	Hong Kong	2:27.830

==== 3000 m ====
19 June

Rank	Team	Time
1st place, gold medalist(s)	Indonesia	14:55.960
2nd place, silver medalist(s)	China	14:59.970
3rd place, bronze medalist(s)	Thailand	15:00.680
4	Japan	16:05.930
5	Macau	16:33.540
