= India at the 2012 Asian Beach Games =

- IOC code: IND
- NOC: Indian Olympic Association

in Haiyang
- Medals Ranked 6th: Gold 2 Silver 0 Bronze 1 Total 3

Asian Beach Games appearances
- 2008; 2010; 2012; 2014; 2016; 2026

India participated in the 2012 Asian Beach Games in Haiyang, China. India won 2 Gold and 1 Bronze medal and finished at 6th place.

== Medalists ==
Medal	Name	Sport	Event	Date	Ref
Gold	Geethu Anna Jose; Anitha Pauldurai; Shireen Limaye; Kiranjit Kaur	3-on-3 basketball	Women	June 19	
Gold	Mamatha Poojary; Kavita Devi; Priyanka Negi; Marshalmary Savariyappan; Randeep Kaur; Priyanka	Beach kabaddi	Women	June 22	
Bronze	Surjeet Kumar; Pathapalam Suresh; Anup Kumar; Thimmarayappa Gopalappa; Manjit Chillar; Pathapalam Suresh	Beach kabaddi	Men	June 21	
