= Philippines at the 2012 Asian Beach Games =

- IOC code: PHI
- NOC: Philippine Olympic Committee
- Website: www.olympic.ph (in English)

in Haiyang
- Competitors: 33
- Medals Ranked 11th: Gold 0 Silver 2 Bronze 2 Total 4

Asian Beach Games appearances
- 2008; 2010; 2012; 2014; 2016; 2026

Philippines competed in the 2012 Asian Beach Games, held in Haiyang, People's Republic of China from June 16 to June 22, 2012. The Philippine contingent finally went home with a medal, an improvement from 2010 Asian Beach Games.

== Medalists ==
=== Silver ===
| No. | Medal | Name | Sport | Event |
|---|---|---|---|---|
| 1 | Silver | Jameson Bumahit; Florence Caro; Nelson Cordova; Raquiel Espinosa; Alex Generalo; Ambrocio Gontinas; Alberto Hugo; Rolando Isidro; Hermie Macaranas; Joseph Magno; Diomedes Manalo; Ric Nacional; Ronniel Rafael; Dativo Romares; Ricky Sardena; Alex Sumagaysay | Dragon boat | Men's 200m |
| 2 | Silver | Jameson Bumahit; Florence Caro; Nelson Cordova; Raquiel Espinosa; Alex Generalo; Ambrocio Gontinas; Alberto Hugo; Rolando Isidro; Hermie Macaranas; Joseph Magno; Diomedes Manalo; Ric Nacional; Ronniel Rafael; Dativo Romares; Ricky Sardena; Alex Sumagaysay | Dragon boat | Men's 500m |

=== Bronze ===
| No. | Medal | Name | Sport | Event |
|---|---|---|---|---|
| 1 | Bronze | Jameson Bumahit; Florence Caro; Nelson Cordova; Raquiel Espinosa; Alex Generalo; Ambrocio Gontinas; Alberto Hugo; Rolando Isidro; Hermie Macaranas; Joseph Magno; Diomedes Manalo; Ric Nacional; Ronniel Rafael; Dativo Romares; Ricky Sardena; Alex Sumagaysay | Dragon boat | Men's 3000m |
| 2 | Bronze | Analyn Almazan; Allana Lim; Melissa Jacob; Ewon Arayi | 3x3 basketball | Women's Team |

=== Multiple ===
| Name | Sport | Gold | Silver | Bronze | Total |
|---|---|---|---|---|---|
| Jameson Bumahit; Florence Caro; Nelson Cordova; Raquiel Espinosa; Alex Generalo; Ambrocio Gontinas; Alberto Hugo; Rolando Isidro; Hermie Macaranas; Joseph Magno; Diomedes Manalo; Ric Nacional; Ronniel Rafael; Dativo Romares; Ricky Sardena; Alex Sumagaysay | Dragon boat | 0 | 2 | 1 | 3 |

== Medal summary ==
=== By sports ===
| Sport | Gold | Silver | Bronze | Total |
|---|---|---|---|---|
| Dragon boat | 0 | 2 | 1 | 3 |
| 3x3 basketball | 0 | 0 | 1 | 1 |
| Totals (2 entries) | 0 | 2 | 2 | 4 |
