= Facheng =

Facheng 发城镇
- Town
- Location in Shandong
- Coordinates: 36°59′49″N 120°59′12″E
- Country: People's Republic of China
- Province: Shandong
- Prefecture-level city: Yantai
- County-level city: Haiyang
- Time zone: UTC+8 (China Standard)

Facheng (Chinese: 发城镇) is a town in Haiyang, Yantai, in eastern Shandong province, China.
