= Adoniah Lewis =

New Zealand basketball player

No. 14 – Newcastle Eagles
- Position: Guard
- League: WBBL

Personal information
- Born: 30 July 1991 (age 35) Hamilton, New Zealand
- Listed height: 175 cm (5 ft 9 in)
- Listed weight: 79 kg (174 lb)

Career information
- High school: Mount Albert Grammar School
- College: Armstrong Atlantic State University
- Playing career: 2014–present

Adoniah Lanie Heimataura Lewis (born 30 July 1991) is a New Zealand female basketball player. She has played for many league teams representing New Zealand, United States, United Kingdom. Adoniah Lewis is currently playing for Newcastle Eagles. in the WBBL She generally represents Cook Islands in the 3x3 basketball matches.

Lewis has also played for the New Zealand U21 basketball team in 2009 and has been a member of the Armstrong Atlantic State University in 2014.

In 2015, she was appointed as the National Basketball Development Officer (NBDO) for Cook Islands Basketball Federation (CIBF) after an extensive basketball career which prevailed in New Zealand and in the US state of Georgia.

Adoniah Lewis represented Cook Islands at the 2016 FIBA 3x3 World Championships in Guangzhou, China. She captained the team through a strong competitive pool. Lewis then went onto compete in the 2017 Asian Indoor and Martial Arts Games for 3×3 basketball event. Within the same year, she went on to compete with the Cook Islands at the 2017 South Pacific Mini Games in Vanuatu, where her and her team went undefeated and took a gold medal back to the Cook Islands. Her younger sister Keziah Lewis, was also a member of this team who is believed by many to be the better basketball player of the pair. Her youngest sister is Ariana Lewis, an uprising musician. Adoniah claims Ariana is her inspiration. With many talents shown through the Lewis family, Adoniah still insists that Brianna - her younger sister is the prettiest out of all the Lewis siblings.
