= 3x3 basketball at the 2022 Asian Games – Men's tournament =

Men at the 2022 Asian Games
- Venue: Deqing Geographic Information Park
- Date: 25 September – 1 October 2023
- Competitors: 76 from 19 nations

Medalists
gold medal	Chinese Taipei
silver medal	Qatar
bronze medal	Mongolia

The men's 3-on-3 basketball tournament at the 2022 Asian Games was held at Deqing Geographic Information Park, Huzhou, China from 25 September to 1 October 2023. Teams were restricted to under-23 players.

== Squads ==
Cambodia	China	Chinese Taipei	Hong Kong
Tep Chhorath; Somoeur Chanyvathana; Soy Pisey; Thea Vantha	Lu Pengcheng; Liu Yuxuan; Zhao Jiaren; Zhou Yanxu	Yu Xiang-ping; Chiang Chun; Wang Jhe-yu; Lin Sin-kuan	Wong Ho Yin; Ansan Lam; Tsang Cham Yuen; Cheung Kwok Chuen
India	Iran	Japan	Jordan
Sahaij Sekhon; Princepal Singh; Pranav Prince; Lokendra Singh	Alireza Sharifi; Ehsan Dalirzahan; Mohammad Mehdi Rahimi; Amir Hossein Yazarloo	Taro Onu; Haruaki Tanaka; Ethan Ryu Ei Jew; Takumi Shimokawa	Adham Dajani; Akef Al-Shiyyab; Mahmoud Hazaymeh; Ali Kanaan
Kazakhstan	Kyrgyzstan	Macau	Malaysia
Adil Narimanov; Radislav Rodionov; Ramazan Samsin; Bogdan Rabchenyuk	Adil Zheenaliev; Temirlan Kapakov; Esengeldi Turusbekov; Nurbek Aidanbek Uulu	Nip Chio Wa; Zeng Pucheng; Yang Xuan; Ho Hou In	De Wee Yiang; Lim Wan Seong; Lee Jia Jun; Lai Kok Weng
Maldives	Mongolia	Philippines	Qatar
Zaidhan Athif Shakoor; Mohamed Aik Neesham; Mohamed Rishwan; Ali Jaasim Abdulla Haneef	Lkhagvaagiin Avirmed; Batzorigiin Sükhbat; Myagmarsürengiin Ölzii-Orshikh; Tsermaagiin Batzayaa	Bismarck Lina; Bryan Sajonia; Janrey Pasaol; Justine Sanchez	Hamad Yassin Mousa; Omar Mohamed Saad; Mohammed Abbasher; Ahmad Saeid Mohamad
South Korea	Thailand	Turkmenistan	
Kim Dong-hyun; Seo Myeong-jin; Lee Weon-seok; Lee Doo-won	Emmanuel Ejesu; Pongsakorn Jaimsawad; Witchaya Phithakphawasutthi; Nicola Franco	Ýewgeniý Nazipow; Kirill Beş; Döwlet Narmyradow; Maksat Hojaberdiýew	

== Results ==
All times are China Standard Time (UTC+08:00)

=== Round robin ===
==== Pool A ====
Pos	Team	Pld	W	L	PF	PA	PD	Qualification
1	Mongolia	4	3 (Note: Tied on head-to-head wins (1). Teams were ranked by their points scored.)	1	75	62	+13	Quarterfinals
2	Chinese Taipei	4	3	1	73	52	+21	Qualification for quarterfinals
3	Philippines	4	3	1	63	56	+7	Qualification for quarterfinals
4	Hong Kong	4	1	3	67	73	−6	
5	Jordan	4	0	4	37	72	−35	

Source: FIBA
Notes:

25 September
13:00

Jordan	8–13	Philippines
Pts: Dajani 3		Pts: Sajonia 6

Deqing Geographic Information Park, Huzhou
Referees: Su (TPE), Shi (CHN)

25 September
16:20

Chinese Taipei	22–12	Hong Kong
Pts: Wang 8		Pts: Lam 8

Deqing Geographic Information Park, Huzhou
Referees: Kim (KOR), Nagoshi (JPN)

26 September
17:00

Philippines	17–12	Chinese Taipei
Pts: Sajonia 6		Pts: Chiang 4

Deqing Geographic Information Park, Huzhou
Referees: Liu (MAS), Kim (KOR)

26 September
18:15

Mongolia	17–13	Jordan
Pts: Sükhbat 7		Pts: Hazaymeh 6

Deqing Geographic Information Park, Huzhou
Referees: Rulyov (KAZ), Banashankara (IND)

27 September
13:00

Chinese Taipei	18–16	Mongolia
Pts: Chiang 6		Pts: Ölzii-Orshikh 9

Deqing Geographic Information Park, Huzhou
Referees: Liu (MAS), Ibragimow (TKM)

27 September
16:20

Hong Kong	15–21	Philippines
Pts: Wong, Tsang 5		Pts: Lina, Pasaol 7

Deqing Geographic Information Park, Huzhou
Referees: Ibragimow (TKM), Liu (MAS)

28 September
17:00

Mongolia	21–19	Hong Kong
Pts: Sükhbat, Ölzii-Orshikh 9		Pts: Lam, Cheung 7

Deqing Geographic Information Park, Huzhou
Referees: Soliman (QAT), Rulyov (KAZ)

28 September
18:15

Jordan	7–21	Chinese Taipei
Pts: Dajani, Al-Shiyyab, Hazaymeh 2		Pts: Yu, Chiang 6

Deqing Geographic Information Park, Huzhou
Referees: Rulyov (KAZ), Ibragimow (TKM)

29 September
13:00

Hong Kong	21–9	Jordan
Pts: Lam 9		Pts: Hazaymeh 5

Deqing Geographic Information Park, Huzhou
Referees: Kim (KOR), Nagoshi (JPN)

29 September
16:20

Philippines	12–21	Mongolia
Pts: Lina 7		Pts: Batzayaa 8

Deqing Geographic Information Park, Huzhou
Referees: Rulyov (KAZ), Shi (CHN)

==== Pool B ====
Pos	Team	Pld	W	L	PF	PA	PD	Qualification
1	South Korea	4	3 (Note: Tied on head-to-head wins (1). Teams were ranked by their points scored. Tournament seeding for the tied teams: JPN 2, IRI 10.)	1	78	56	+22	Quarterfinals
2	Japan	4	3	1	75	61	+14	Qualification for quarterfinals
3	Iran	4	3	1	75	53	+22	Qualification for quarterfinals
4	Turkmenistan	4	1	3	65	59	+6	
5	Maldives	4	0	4	23	87	−64	

Source: FIBA
Notes:

25 September
13:25

Turkmenistan	22–2	Maldives
Pts: Narmyradow 9		Pts: Rishwan 2

Deqing Geographic Information Park, Huzhou
Referees: Liu (MAS), Banashankara (IND)

25 September
16:45

Iran	12–21	South Korea
Pts: Yazarloo 7		Pts: Seo 11

Deqing Geographic Information Park, Huzhou
Referees: Rulyov (KAZ), Su (TPE)

26 September
17:25

Maldives	6–22	Iran
Pts: Haneef 4		Pts: Dalirzahan 7

Deqing Geographic Information Park, Huzhou
Referees: Su (TPE), Soliman (QAT)

26 September
18:40

Japan	19–15	Turkmenistan
Pts: Tanaka 15		Pts: Nazipow, Beş, Hojaberdiýew 4

Deqing Geographic Information Park, Huzhou
Referees: Su (TPE), Liu (MAS)

27 September
13:25

Iran	22–13	Japan
Pts: Rahimi 8		Pts: Tanaka 6

Deqing Geographic Information Park, Huzhou
Referees: Shi (CHN), Banashankara (IND)

27 September
16:45

South Korea	21–8	Maldives
Pts: Lee D. 10		Pts: Rishwan 6

Deqing Geographic Information Park, Huzhou
Referees: Banashankara (IND), Su (TPE)

28 September
17:25

Japan	21–17	South Korea
Pts: Tanaka 9		Pts: Lee W., Lee D. 6

Deqing Geographic Information Park, Huzhou
Referees: Shi (CHN), Liu (MAS)

28 September
18:40

Turkmenistan	13–19	Iran
Pts: Beş, Narmyradow 5		Pts: Dalirzahan 8

Deqing Geographic Information Park, Huzhou
Referees: Shi (CHN), Banashankara (IND)

29 September
13:25

South Korea	19–15	Turkmenistan
Pts: Lee D. 12		Pts: Narmyradow 5

Deqing Geographic Information Park, Huzhou
Referees: Shi (CHN), Rulyov (KAZ)

29 September
16:45

Maldives	7–22	Japan
Pts: Rishwan 3		Pts: Onu 8

Deqing Geographic Information Park, Huzhou
Referees: Soliman (QAT), Rulyov (KAZ)

==== Pool C ====
Pos	Team	Pld	W	L	PF	PA	PD	Qualification
1	China	3	3	0	60	36	+24	Quarterfinals
2	India	3	2	1	56	46	+10	Qualification for quarterfinals
3	Macau	3	1	2	49	59	−10	Qualification for quarterfinals
4	Malaysia	3	0	3	38	62	−24	

Source: FIBA

25 September
14:40

Malaysia	16–20	India
Pts: Lim 10		Pts: Sekhon 10

Deqing Geographic Information Park, Huzhou
Referees: Rulyov (KAZ), Ibragimow (TKM)

25 September
19:50

China	21–16	Macau
Pts: Zhao 9		Pts: Zeng, Yang 5

Deqing Geographic Information Park, Huzhou
Referees: Rulyov (KAZ), Soliman (QAT)

27 September
14:40

Macau	12–21	India
Pts: Ho 5		Pts: Sekhon 10

Deqing Geographic Information Park, Huzhou
Referees: Su (TPE), Ibragimow (TKM)

27 September
19:50

China	21–5	Malaysia
Pts: Zhao 10		Pts: De 3

Deqing Geographic Information Park, Huzhou
Referees: Rulyov (KAZ), Burmaa (MGL)

29 September
14:40

Malaysia	17–21	Macau
Pts: Lee, Lai 7		Pts: Zeng 7

Deqing Geographic Information Park, Huzhou
Referees: Nagoshi (JPN), Kim (KOR)

29 September
19:50

India	15–18	China
Pts: Prince 6		Pts: Zhao 10

Deqing Geographic Information Park, Huzhou
Referees: Ibragimow (TKM), Liu (MAS)

==== Pool D ====
Pos	Team	Pld	W	L	PF	PA	PD	Qualification
1	Qatar	4	4	0	77	33	+44	Quarterfinals
2	Kazakhstan	4	3	1	71	64	+7	Qualification for quarterfinals
3	Thailand	4	2	2	71	50	+21	Qualification for quarterfinals
4	Cambodia	4	1	3	45	78	−33	
5	Kyrgyzstan	4	0	4	41	80	−39	

Source: FIBA

25 September
15:05

Thailand	21–10	Cambodia
Pts: Ejesu 10		Pts: Tep 6

Deqing Geographic Information Park, Huzhou
Referees: Liu (MAS), Burmaa (MGL)

25 September
20:15

Kazakhstan	20–16	Kyrgyzstan
Pts: Narimanov 7		Pts: Zheenaliev 8

Deqing Geographic Information Park, Huzhou
Referees: Liu (MAS), Burmaa (MGL)

26 September
17:50

Cambodia	13–21	Kazakhstan
Pts: Tep 7		Pts: Rodionov 7

Deqing Geographic Information Park, Huzhou
Referees: Nagoshi (JPN), Ibragimow (TKM)

26 September
19:05

Qatar	16–12	Thailand
Pts: Abbasher 7		Pts: Ejesu, Franco 4

Deqing Geographic Information Park, Huzhou
Referees: Shi (CHN), Burmaa (MGL)

27 September
15:05

Kazakhstan	11–19	Qatar
Pts: Narimanov, Rodionov 4		Pts: Mousa 9

Deqing Geographic Information Park, Huzhou
Referees: Liu (MAS), Shi (CHN)

27 September
20:15

Kyrgyzstan	15–17	Cambodia
Pts: Aidanbek Uulu 7		Pts: Somoeur, Soy 5

Deqing Geographic Information Park, Huzhou
Referees: Nagoshi (JPN), Soliman (QAT)

28 September
17:50

Qatar	21–5	Kyrgyzstan
Pts: Abbasher 8		Pts: Turusbekov, Aidanbek Uulu 2

Deqing Geographic Information Park, Huzhou
Referees: Nagoshi (JPN), Burmaa (MGL)

28 September
19:05

Thailand	16–19	Kazakhstan
Pts: Ejesu 9		Pts: Narimanov 9

Deqing Geographic Information Park, Huzhou
Referees: Su (TPE), Kim (KOR)

29 September
15:05

Kyrgyzstan	5–22	Thailand
Pts: Turusbekov 5		Pts: Ejesu 13

Deqing Geographic Information Park, Huzhou
Referees: Shi (CHN), Nagoshi (JPN)

29 September
20:15

Cambodia	5–21	Qatar
Pts: Tep 3		Pts: Mousa 9

Deqing Geographic Information Park, Huzhou
Referees: Su (TPE), Burmaa (MGL)

=== Knockout round ===
Qualification for quarterfinals
30 September
India	17
Iran	19
30 September
Japan	21
Macau	12
30 September
Chinese Taipei	19
Thailand	17
30 September
Kazakhstan	14
Philippines	15

Quarterfinals
30 September
Mongolia	16
Iran	15
30 September
Qatar	21
Japan	15
30 September
China	15
Chinese Taipei	22
30 September
South Korea	19
Philippines	16

Semifinals
1 October
Mongolia	13
Qatar	21
1 October
Chinese Taipei (OT)	18
South Korea	17

Gold medal game
1 October
Qatar	16
Chinese Taipei	18
Bronze medal game
1 October
Mongolia	21
South Korea	20

==== Qualification for quarterfinals ====
30 September
13:25

India	17–19	Iran
Pts: P. Singh 9		Pts: Yazarloo 7

Deqing Geographic Information Park, Huzhou
Referees: Liu (MAS), Rulyov (KAZ)

30 September
14:15

Japan	21–12	Macau
Pts: Tanaka 13		Pts: Nip 5

Deqing Geographic Information Park, Huzhou
Referees: Kim (KOR), Ibragimow (TKM)

30 September
15:05

Chinese Taipei	19–17	Thailand
Pts: Yu 7		Pts: Ejesu 9

Deqing Geographic Information Park, Huzhou
Referees: Rulyov (KAZ), Kim (KOR)

30 September
15:55

Kazakhstan	14–15	Philippines
Pts: Samsin 8		Pts: Pasaol 5

Deqing Geographic Information Park, Huzhou
Referees: Liu (MAS), Nagoshi (JPN)

==== Quarterfinals ====
30 September
18:25

Mongolia	16–15	Iran
Pts: Sükhbat 10		Pts: Dalirzahan 6

Deqing Geographic Information Park, Huzhou
Referees: Kim (KOR), Liu (MAS)

30 September
19:15

Qatar	21–15	Japan
Pts: Saad 7		Pts: Shimokawa 6

Deqing Geographic Information Park, Huzhou
Referees: Rulyov (KAZ), Shi (CHN)

30 September
20:05

China	15–22	Chinese Taipei
Pts: Liu 8		Pts: Lin 14

Deqing Geographic Information Park, Huzhou
Referees: Liu (MAS), Nagoshi (JPN)

30 September
20:55

South Korea	19–16	Philippines
Pts: Lee W. 7		Pts: Pasaol 6

Deqing Geographic Information Park, Huzhou
Referees: Shi (CHN), Su (TPE)

==== Semifinals ====
1 October
16:50

Mongolia	13–21	Qatar
Pts: Sükhbat 9		Pts: Abbasher 6

Deqing Geographic Information Park, Huzhou
Referees: Shi (CHN), Su (TPE)

1 October
17:15

Chinese Taipei	18–17 (OT)	South Korea
Pts: Lin 7		Pts: Seo 12

Deqing Geographic Information Park, Huzhou
Referees: Liu (MAS), Nagoshi (JPN)

==== Bronze medal game ====
1 October
19:30

Mongolia	21–20	South Korea
Pts: Sükhbat 10		Pts: Lee W. 9

Deqing Geographic Information Park, Huzhou
Referees: Su (TPE), Shi (CHN)

==== Gold medal game ====
1 October
20:30

Qatar	16–18	Chinese Taipei
Pts: Saad 6		Pts: Lin 7

Deqing Geographic Information Park, Huzhou
Referees: Liu (MAS), Rulyov (KAZ)

== Final standing ==
Rank	Team	Pld	W	L
1st place, gold medalist(s)	Chinese Taipei	8	7	1
2nd place, silver medalist(s)	Qatar	7	6	1
3rd place, bronze medalist(s)	Mongolia	7	5	2
4	South Korea	7	4	3
5	China	4	3	1
6	Japan	6	4	2
7	Iran	6	4	2
8	Philippines	6	4	2
9	Kazakhstan	5	3	2
10	India	4	2	2
11	Thailand	5	2	3
12	Macau	4	1	3
13	Hong Kong	4	1	3
14	Turkmenistan	4	1	3
15	Cambodia	4	1	3
16	Malaysia	3	0	3
17	Kyrgyzstan	4	0	4
18	Jordan	4	0	4
19	Maldives	4	0	4
