= Zhuwu =

Zhuwu 朱吴镇
- Town
- Location in Shandong
- Coordinates: 36°53′51″N 121°06′00″E
- Country: People's Republic of China
- Province: Shandong
- Prefecture-level city: Yantai
- County: Haiyang
- Time zone: UTC+8 (China Standard)

Zhuwu (Chinese: 朱吴镇) is a town in Haiyang, Yantai, in eastern Shandong province, China.
