= Mongolia men's national 3x3 team =

Mongolian basketball team

Mongolia
- FIBA zone: FIBA Asia
- National federation: Mongolian Basketball Association
- Coach: Steve Sir

FIBA 3x3 World Cup
- Appearances: 6

Asian Cup
- Appearances: 9
- Medals: (gold) Gold: (2017, 2023); (silver) Silver: (2018, 2019); (bronze) Bronze: (2024)

Asian Games
- Appearances: 2
- Medals: (bronze) Bronze: (2022)
Medal record
Men's 3x3 basketball
Representing Mongolia
Asian Cup
Gold medal – first place	2017 Ulaanbaatar	Team
Gold medal – first place	2023 Singapore	Team
Silver medal – second place	2018 Shenzhen	Team
Silver medal – second place	2019 Changsha	Team
Bronze medal – third place	2024 Singapore	Team
Asian Games
Bronze medal – third place	2022 Hangzhou	Team
World Beach Games
Bronze medal – third place	2019 Doha	Team
Asian Indoor and Martial Arts Games
Bronze medal – third place	2017 Ashgabat	Team
Asian Beach Games
Silver medal – second place	2016 Da Nang	Team
Bronze medal – third place	2012 Haiyang	Team
World University League
Gold medal – first place	2017 Fujian
World University Championships
Silver medal – second place	2016 Xiamen
Asian University Championships
Gold medal – first place	2019 Kinmen
Gold medal – first place	2017 Kuala Lumpur
Silver medal – second place	2015 Liaoning
Bronze medal – third place	2018 Kuala Lumpur

The Mongolia men's national 3x3 team is a national basketball team of Mongolia, administered by the Mongolian Basketball Association. It represents the country in international 3x3 (3 against 3) basketball competitions.

Even though Mongolia is one of FIBA Asia's youngest members, its national 3x3 basketball team already achieved international results.

The Mongolian team made their debut in the FIBA 3x3 World Cup in 2018. They qualified for the 2018 edition of the tournament through their association's FIBA 3x3 Federation World Ranking.

== Tournament record ==
=== Summer Olympics ===
Year	Position	Pld	W	L
(Japan) 2020 Tokyo	Did not qualify			
(France) 2024 Paris	Did not qualify			
(United States) 2028 Los Angeles
Total	0/3	0	0	0

=== World Cup ===
Year	Pos	Pld	W	L	Players
(Greece) 2012	did not qualify				
(Russia) 2014	did not qualify				
(China) 2016	did not qualify				
(France) 2017	did not qualify				
(Philippines) 2018	8th	5	3	2	Dulguun, Delgernyam, Tserenbaatar, Tsenguunbayar
(Netherlands) 2019	13th	4	2	2	Dulguun, Delgernyam, Tserenbaatar, Otgonjargal
(Belgium) 2022	9th	5	3	2	Dulguun, Delgernyam, Anand, Enkhbaatar
(Austria) 2023	18th	4	1	3	Anand, Delgernyam, Enkhbaatar, Otgonjargal
(Mongolia) 2025	19th	4	0	4	Anand, Delgernyam, Enkhbat, Enkhbaatar
(Poland) 2026	15th	4	1	3	Anand, Erdenetsetseg, Gankhuyag, Gantsolmon
(Singapore) 2027	To be determined				
Total	6/11	22	9	13	

=== Asian Games ===
Year	Pos	Pld	W	L	Players
(Indonesia) 2018	15th	4	2	2	Munkh-Orgil, Ikhbayar, Sukhbat, Enkhbaatar
(China) 2022	3rd	7	5	2	Ulzii-Orshih, Sukhbat, Avirmed, Batzayaa
(Japan) 2026	To be determined				
Total	0/3	11	7	4	

=== FIBA 3x3 Asia Cup ===
Year	Pos	Pld	W	L	Players
(Qatar) 2013	9th	3	1	2	Byambanaran, Dulguun, Munkhtuvshin, Tserenbaatar
(Mongolia) 2017	Gold medal	5	5	0	Dulguun, Delgernyam, Tserenbaatar, Tsenguunbayar
(China) 2018	Silver medal	5	3	2	Dulguun, Delgernyam, Tserenbaatar, Tsenguunbayar
(China) 2019	Silver medal	5	3	2	Dulguun, Delgernyam, Tserenbaatar, Gansukh
(Singapore) 2022	5th	3	2	1	Dulguun, Delgernyam, Anand, Otgonjargal
(Singapore) 2023	Gold medal	5	5	0	Dulguun, Delgernyam, Anand, Enkhbaatar
(Singapore) 2024	3rd	5	4	1	Azbayar, Anand, Temuulen, Binderiya
(Singapore) 2025	5th	3	2	1	Anand, Enkhbat, Gankhuyag, Tsogt
(Singapore) 2026	5th	3	2	1	Erdenetsetseg, Gantsolmon, Munkh-Ulzii, Nyamdorj
Total	9/9	37	27	10	

=== FIBA 3x3 U 23 World Cup ===
Year	Position	Pld	W	L
(Romania) 2022	9th	4	2	2
(Poland) 2023	11th	4	2	2
(Mongolia) 2024	13th	4	1	3
(China) 2025	9th	4	3	1

=== World Beach Games ===
Year	Position	Pld	W	L
(Qatar) 2019	3rd	6	4	2
(Indonesia) 2023	Cancelled			

== See also ==
- Mongolia national basketball team
- Mongolia women's national 3x3 team
- Ulaanbaatar MMC Energy
