= Xingcun =

Xingcun 行村镇
- Town
- Location in Shandong
- Coordinates: 36°40′55″N 120°54′47″E
- Country: People's Republic of China
- Province: Shandong
- Prefecture-level city: Yantai
- County: Haiyang
- Time zone: UTC+8 (China Standard)

Xingcun (Chinese: 行村镇) is a town in Haiyang, Yantai, in eastern Shandong province, China.
