= Guocheng =

Guocheng 郭城镇
- Town
- Location in Shandong
- Coordinates: 37°03′30″N 121°06′51″E
- Country: People's Republic of China
- Province: Shandong
- Prefecture-level city: Yantai
- County: Haiyang
- Time zone: UTC+8 (China Standard)

Guocheng (Chinese: 郭城镇) is a town in Haiyang, Yantai, in eastern Shandong province, China.
