= Ariunboldyn Anand =

Mongolian basketball player (born 1997)

Anand Ariunbold
Personal information
- Born: 14 April 1997 (age 29) Ulaanbaatar, Mongolia
- Listed height: 1.97 m (6 ft 6 in)

Career history
- 2019: Ulaanbaatar MMC Energy
- 2020 – present: Sansar MMC Energy

Career highlights
- FIBA Asia 3x3 Cup winner (2023); FIBA 3x3 Most Spectacular Player (2022); FIBA Asia 3x3 Cup Team of the Tournament (2024); The League winner (2024)
Medals
Men's 3x3 basketball
Representing Mongolia
Asian Cup
Gold medal – first place	2023 Singapore	Team
Bronze medal – third place	2024 Singapore	Team
World Beach Games
Bronze medal – third place	2019 Doha	Team

Anand Ariunbold (Mongolian: Ариунболдын Ананд, born 14 April 1997) is a Mongolian basketball player for the Sansar MMC Energy of the FIBA 3x3 World Tour and Mongolian 3x3 national team.

== Professional career ==
In March 2018, he began competing in 3x3 basketball tournaments with the Jobu University team at the 4th 3x3 Japan Championships Gunma Stop.

=== Ulaanbaatar MMC Energy ===
In 2019 season, he competed for Ulaanbaatar MMC energy team. In his first event with the Ulaanbaatar team, he placed fifth in the Ulaanbaatar Challenger 2019. He won a bronze medal with the Ulaanbaatar squad at the Inje Challenger 2019 in South Korea in August.

=== Sansar MMC Energy ===
Anand Ariunbold has been a member of Ulaanbaatar MMC Energy team since 2020 and one of the four members who founded the team. Their first victory came soon after, when they won the 2020 MGL 3x3 League Final competition. In 2022, the Sansar MMC Energy team finished the runner-up position in the Asia Pacific Super Quest and third in the WT Manila 2022 tournaments, respectively.

=== National team career ===
Anand Ariunbold represented the Mongolian national basketball team at the 2018 Asian Games in Jakarta, Indonesia. He also played at the 2025 FIBA Asia Cup pre-qualifier tournament for representing the Mongolian national basketball team in Ulaanbaatar, Mongolia.

=== 3x3 National team career ===
He took bronze in the 2019 World Beach Games. Anand Ariunbold represented Mongolia men's national 3x3 team in a number of FIBA 3x3 World Cup and FIBA Asia 3x3 Cup competitions. He won FIBA Asia 3x3 Cup in 2023, defeating the Australia men's national 3x3 team in the final. He made a game-winning shot from free-throw line.
