= Guim Expósito =

Spanish basketball player (born 1994)

CB Santfeliuenc
- Position: Point guard
- League: Segunda FEB

Personal information
- Born: 27 March 1994 (age 32) Barcelona, Spain
- Listed height: 198 cm (6 ft 6 in)

Career information
- Playing career: 2014–present

Career history
- 2014–2015: Santfeliuenc
- 2015–2016: Cornellà
- 2016–2017: Eurocolegio Casvi
- 2017–2019: Wetterbygden Stars
- 2019: Oviedo
- 2019–2020: Real Valladolid
- 2020–2021: Umeå BSKT
- 2021–2022: CB Esparreguera
- 2022–: CB Santfeliuenc
Medals
Men's 3x3 basketball
Representing Spain
FIBA 3x3 World Cup
Gold medal – first place	2025 Ulaanbaatar	Team

Guim Expósito Fortuny (born 27 March 1994) is a Spanish basketball player for CB Santfeliuenc of the Segunda FEB. Standing at 1.98 m (6 ft 6 in), he plays in the point guard position. He also plays for the Spanish national 3x3 team.

== Professional career ==
Expósito played in the Liga EBA for three seasons. In 2014-2015, he played for CB Santfeliuenc, then moved to CB Cornellà the following season, and in 2016-2017, he played for CB Eurocolegio Casvi.

In the 2017-2018 season, Expósito joined Wetterbygden Stars Huskvarna, a member of the Swedish second division. After a strong season in which he averaged 16 points, 5.3 rebounds, and 5 assists, he earned promotion to the Svenska Basketligan and renewed his contract with the same club to make his debut in Sweden's first division. During the 2018-2019 season, he played thirty games and also posted very good numbers, averaging 12 points, 3.2 rebounds, and 4.6 assists per game.

In June 2019, Expósito signed with Oviedo of the LEB Oro after having a great season in LEB Plata.

On 25 November 2019, Expósito had his contract with Oviedo terminated, and the following day, he began playing for Real Valladolid of the LEB Oro.

On 28 August 2020, Expósito signed with Umeå BSKT of the Swedish First Division.

On 17 August 2021, Expósito returned to Spain and signed with CB Esparreguera of the Liga EBA.

In the 2022-23 season, Expósito signed with CB Santfeliuenc of the Liga EBA, with which he achieved promotion to the LEB Plata League. He continued playing for the Sant Feliu de Llobregat team in the third division of Spanish basketball in the 2023-24 season.

== National team career ==
In 2025, Expósito was called up to the Spanish national 3x3 team. He was part of that team that won the 3x3 World Cup. He was awarded the competition's MVP and was named to the Team of the Tournament.
