= Ulaanbaatar MMC Energy =

- Leagues: FIBA 3x3 World Tour
- Founded: 2017; 8 years ago
- Location: Ulaanbaatar, Mongolia
- Main sponsor: Mongolian Mining Corporation
- Head coach: -
- Team captain: Davaasambuu Delgernyam
- Championships: 2 Challenger

Ulaanbaatar MMC Energy is a men's professional 3x3 team based in Ulaanbaatar, Mongolia which plays the FIBA 3x3 Men's Pro Circuit. The team is sponsored by the Mongolian firm Mongolian Mining Corporation (MMC).

== History ==
Ulaanbaatar MMC Energy was established in 2017, and regularly competed in FIBA 3x3 Men's Pro Circuit tournaments. In 2019, the team, which is composed of the core of the Mongolia national 3x3 team, made a bid to be among the four teams to outright qualify for the men's 3x3 tournament in the 2020 Summer Olympics via men's national team rankings. At fourth place, Mongolia would have qualified if Japan did not use its privilege as host to enter its men's team without going through the qualifiers.

At the 2019 FIBA 3x3 Jeju Challenger in Jeju, South Korea, Ulaanbaatar became the first Asian team to win in a Grand Prix-level event in the FIBA 3x3 Pro Circuit by winning 13-10 over Slovenian team, Piran in the final. Within the same year, they made their best finish in a FIBA 3x3 World Tour tournament in the 2019 Los Angeles Masters by placing fourth.

== Players ==
=== Current roster ===
Ulaanbaatar MMC Energy roster
Players
Coaches

Pos.	No.	Nat.	Name	Ht.	Wt.	Age
		(Mongolia)	Davaasambuu, Delgernyam	1.93 m (6 ft 4 in)	106 kg (234 lb)	34 – 8 April 1990
		(Mongolia)	Enkhbat, Dulguun	1.90 m (6 ft 3 in)	90 kg (198 lb)	32 – 27 March 1992
		(Mongolia)	Tsenguunbayar, Gotov
		(Canada)	Sir, Steve
		(Mongolia)	Chuluunbaatar, Ikhbayar
		(Montenegro)	Dugosija, Marko	1.98 m (6 ft 6 in)
		(Mongolia)	Tsogt, Otgonjargal
		(Mongolia)	G, Bolor-Erdene

Head coach

N/A

Legend

- (C) Team captain
- (R) Reserve
- Injured

== Season by season ==
Season	Qualification	Pos.	Finals	FR	Ref.
2019	Lausanne	Q	12th place	0–2	
2019	Jeddah	Q	7th place	1–2	
2019	Los Angeles	Q	4th place	2–2	
2020	Hungary	Q	8th place	1–1	
2020	Europe	Q	10th place	0–2	
