= Natan Jurkovitz =

French basketball player

Natan Jurkovitz נתן ג'ורקוביץ
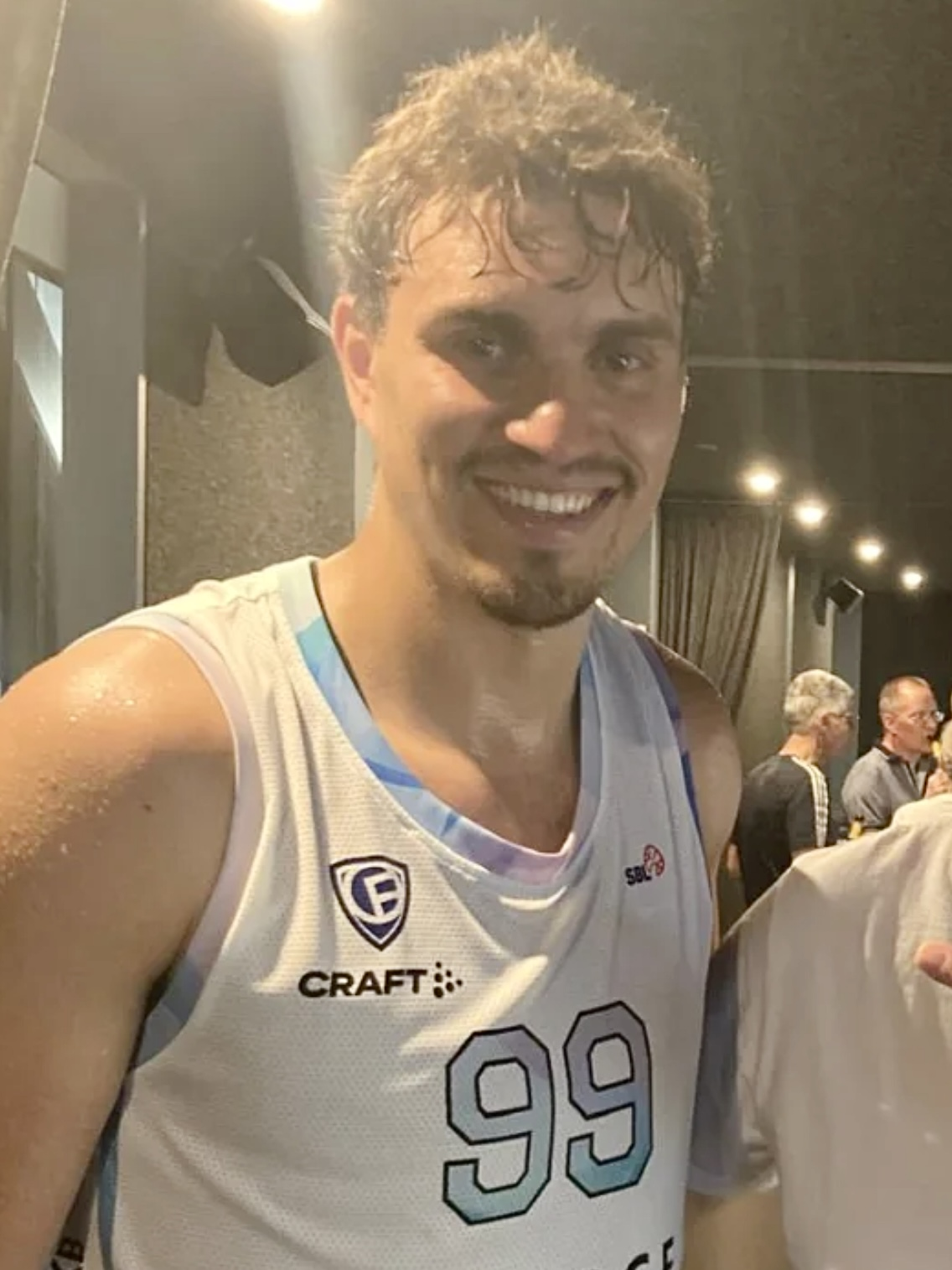

No. 99 – Fribourg Olympic
- Position: Forward
- League: Swiss Basketball League

Personal information
- Born: April 4, 1995 (age 31) Poitiers, France
- Listed height: 6 ft 8 in (2.03 m)
- Listed weight: 220 lb (100 kg)

Career information
- Playing career: 2015–present

Career history
- 2015–2020: Fribourg Olympic
- 2020–2021: Hapoel Be'er Sheva B.C.
- 2021: Lions de Genève
- 2021–present: Fribourg Olympic
Medals
Men's 3x3 basketball
Representing Switzerland
FIBA 3x3 World Cup
Silver medal – second place	2025 Ulaanbaatar	Team

Natan Jurkovitz (נתן ג'ורקוביץ; born April 4, 1995) is a French-Swiss-Israeli basketball player in the forward position.

Before he joined Lions de Genève, he played for Hapoel Be'er Sheva of the Israeli Premier Basketball League.

== Biography ==
Jurkovitz was born in Poitiers, France, and his hometown is Villars-sur-Glâne, Canton of Fribourg, Switzerland. He is 6 ft 8 in (203 cm) tall, and weighs 220 pounds (100 kg).

He first played for Fribourg Olympic in the Swiss Basketball League. Jurkovitz then played for Lions de Genève, another team in the Swiss Basketball League. He averaged 12.1 points, 5.9 rebounds and 4.1 assists in the Swiss Basketball League in 2019–20.

In August 2020, Jurkovitz left Lions de Genève to sign a three-year deal with Hapoel Be'er Sheva of the Israeli Premier Basketball League.
