= Iván Aurrecoechea =

Spanish basketball player

No. 0 – CB Estudiantes
- League: Primera FEB

Personal information
- Born: 19 November 1995 (age 30) Alcalá de Henares, Spain
- Listed height: 204 cm (6 ft 8 in)
- Listed weight: 109 kg (240 lb)

Career information
- College: Indian Hills (2016–2018); NM State (2018–2020)
- Playing career: 2013–present

Career history
- 2013–2014: Estudiantes B
- 2014–2015: CEBA Guadalajara
- 2015–2016: Canarias Basketball Academy
- 2020–2021: Þór Akureyri
- 2021–2022: Grindavík
- 2022: Colegio Los Leones de Quilpué
- 2022–2023: Albacete Basket
- 2023: Estudiantes
- 2023–2024: Gipuzkoa Basket
- 2024–2025: Granada
- 2025–2026: Fuenlabrada
- 2026–present: Estudiantes

Career highlights
- All-WAC First Team (2020)
Medals
Men's 3x3 basketball
Representing Spain
FIBA 3x3 World Cup
Gold medal – first place	2025 Ulaanbaatar	Team

Iván Aurrecoechea Alcolado (born 19 November 1995) is a Spanish basketball player for Estudiantes of the Spanish Primera FEB. He played college basketball for Indian Hills Community College and New Mexico State University.

== Playing career ==
=== Early career ===
His first steps in basketball were at the local Torrejón Basketball Academy, in his hometown of Torrejón de Ardoz, in the outskirts of Madrid. During the 2013–2014 season, Aurrecoechea played for CB Estudiantes B in the Liga EBA. The following season he played for CEBA Guadalajara in the LEB Plata.

=== College career ===
Aurrecoechea started his college career with Indian Hills Community College in 2016–17. He started 25 of 33 games as a freshman where he averaged 9.8 points and 9.4 rebounds. He earned ICCAC All-Region First-Team honors after guiding the Warriors to an NJCAA Region XI Championship. The following season he averaged 13.1 points and 11.5 rebounds per game, earning his second ICCAC All-Region First-Team honors. In 2018, he transferred to New Mexico State University. During the 2018–19 season he helped NM State to its third-straight WAC tournament title while averaging 9.6 points and 5.3 rebounds. During his senior season, he averaged 11.4 points and 5.6 rebounds per game and was named to the All-WAC First Team.

=== Professional career ===
In August 2020, Aurrecoechea signed with Úrvalsdeild karla club Þór Akureyri. He was an instant hit for the team, posting double-double in his first eight games of the season and fitting well with point guard Dedrick Basile. On 7 March 2021, he had 36 points and 15 rebounds in a victory against Grindavík. For the season he averaged 20.0 points and 11.3 rebounds per game during the regular season, helping Þór to a 7th-place finish. During the playoffs, Aurrecoechea averaged 15.5 points and 10.0 rebounds in Þór's 1–3 loss against Þór Þorlákshöfn in the first round.

In August 2021, Aurrecoechea signed with Grindavík.

On June 19, 2024, he signed with Covirán Granada of the Liga ACB.

On December 17, 2025, he signed with Fuenlabrada of the Spanish Primera FEB.
