= Dulguun Enkhbat =

Mongolian basketball player (born 1992)

Personal information
- Born: 27 March 1992 (age 34) Ulaanbaatar, Mongolia
- Listed height: 1.90 m (6 ft 3 in)
- Listed weight: 90 kg (198 lb)
- Position: Guard

Career history
- 2017–present: Ulaanbaatar MMC Energy

Career highlights
- 2× FIBA Asia 3x3 Cup winner (2017, 2023); FIBA Asia 3x3 Cup MVP (2017); FIBA Asia 3x3 Cup Team of the Tournament (2017, 2018); FIBA 3x3 World Tour winner (2023); FIBA 3x3 Challenger winner (2019)
Medals
Men's 3x3 basketball
Representing Mongolia
Asian Cup
Gold medal – first place	2017 Ulaanbaatar	Team
Gold medal – first place	2023 Singapore	Team
Silver medal – second place	2018 Shenzhen	Team
Silver medal – second place	2019 Changsha	Team
Asian Indoor and Martial Arts Games
Bronze medal – third place	2017 Ashgabat	Team
World University Championships
Silver medal – second place	2016 Xiamen	Team
Asian University Championships
Silver medal – second place	2015 Liaoning	Team

Dulguun Enkhbat, also known as Enkhbatyn Dölgöön (Mongolian: Энхбатын Дөлгөөн; Mongolian script: ᠡᠩᢈᠡᠪᠠᠲᠤ ᠶ᠋ᠢᠨ ᠳᠥᠯᠦᢉᠡᠨ; born 27 March 1992) is a Mongolian basketball player for the Mongolian 3x3 national team.

== Professional career ==
Dulguun Enkhbat started his professional career in 2012.

=== Ulaanbaatar MMC Energy ===
Dulguun Enkhbat has been a member of Ulaanbaatar MMC Energy team since 2017. He started to play at the FIBA 3X3 tournaments from Nanjing Challenger 2017 in April 2017 where team finished the tournament with 3rd place. In 2017, FIBA named Dulguun Enkhbat as one of the top 10 male 3x3 basketball player of the year.

=== National team career ===
Dulguun Enkhbat represented for the Mongolian national basketball team at the 2013 Summer Universiade in Kazan, Russia and 2015 Summer Universiade in Gwangju, South Korea. He also named for the Mongolian national basketball team roster for FIBA Asia Cup 2025 Pre-Qualifier in November, 2022. However, he didn't play due to hand injury.

=== 3x3 National team career ===
Dulguun Enkhbat played with the Mongolia men's national 3x3 team at several FIBA 3x3 World Cup and FIBA Asia 3x3 Cup tournaments. In 2017, he won FIBA Asia 3x3 Cup defeating the New Zealand men's national 3x3 team in the final and named player of the tournament. He won the FIBA 3x3 Asia Cup for the second time with the Mongolian basketball 3x3 team in 2023.

== Filmography ==
=== Web shows ===
Year	Title	Role	Notes	Ref.
2025	Physical: Asia	Contestant	Team Mongolia	
