= Davaasambuugiin Delgernyam =

Mongolian basketball player (born 1990)

Personal information
- Born: 8 April 1990 (age 36) Mongolia
- Listed height: 1.93 m (6 ft 4 in)
- Listed weight: 106 kg (234 lb)

Career information
- NBA draft: N/A: undrafted
- Position: Power Forward, Center

Career history
- 2017–present: Ulaanbaatar MMC Energy

Career highlights
- 2× FIBA Asia 3x3 Cup winner (2017, 2023) winner FIBA 3X3 World Tour 2023); FIBA Asia 3x3 Cup MVP (2023); FIBA Asia 3x3 Cup Team of the Tournament (2019, 2023); FIBA 3x3 World Tour winner (2023) at Shanghai Masters on October 15th, 2023; FIBA 3x3 Challenger winner (2019); FIBA 3x3 Challenger MVP (2019)
Medals
Men's 3x3 basketball
Representing Mongolia
Asian Cup
Gold medal – first place	2017 Ulaanbaatar	Team
Gold medal – first place	2023 Singapore	Team
Silver medal – second place	2018 Shenzhen	Team
Silver medal – second place	2019 Changsha	Team
Asian Indoor and Martial Arts Games
Bronze medal – third place	2017 Ashgabat	Team
Asian Beach Games
Silver medal – second place	2016 Da Nang	Team
Bronze medal – third place	2012 Haiyang	Team

Davaasambuugiin Delgernyam (Mongolian: Даваасамбуугийн Дэлгэрням, born 8 April 1990) is a Mongolian basketball player for the Mongolian 3x3 national team. He also plays in Ulaanbaatar MMC team, which is currently ranked # 10 in the world of FIBA 3x3 ranking. Based on his physicality and playing style he earned two nicknames: Mongolian Monster and Bull.

== Professional career ==
Delgernyam Davaasambuu started his professional career in 2010.

=== Ulaanbaatar MMC Energy ===
Delgernyam Davaasambuu has been a member of the Ulaanbaatar MMC Energy team (previously known as Ulaanbaatar Garuudai) since 2017 and is one of the four players who founded the team. He began playing in FIBA 3X3 events with the Nanjing Challenger 2017 in April 2017, when his team finished third.

=== National team career ===
Delgernyam Davaasambuu represented the Mongolian national basketball team at the 2013 Summer Universiade in Kazan, Russia. He also played at the 2014 Asian Games for representing Mongolian national basketball team in Incheon, South Korea.

=== 3x3 National team career ===
Delgernyam Davaasambuu represented Mongolia men's national 3x3 team in a number FIBA 3x3 World Cup and FIBA Asia 3x3 Cup competitions. He won FIBA Asia 3x3 Cup in 2017, defeating the New Zealand men's national 3x3 team in the final. In 2023, he won the 2023 FIBA 3x3 Asia Cup with Mongolian basketball 3x3 team and named the player of the tournament (MVP) and team of the tournament after leading Mongolia to their second Asia Cup title.
