= Haiyang =

Haiyang 海阳市
- County-level city
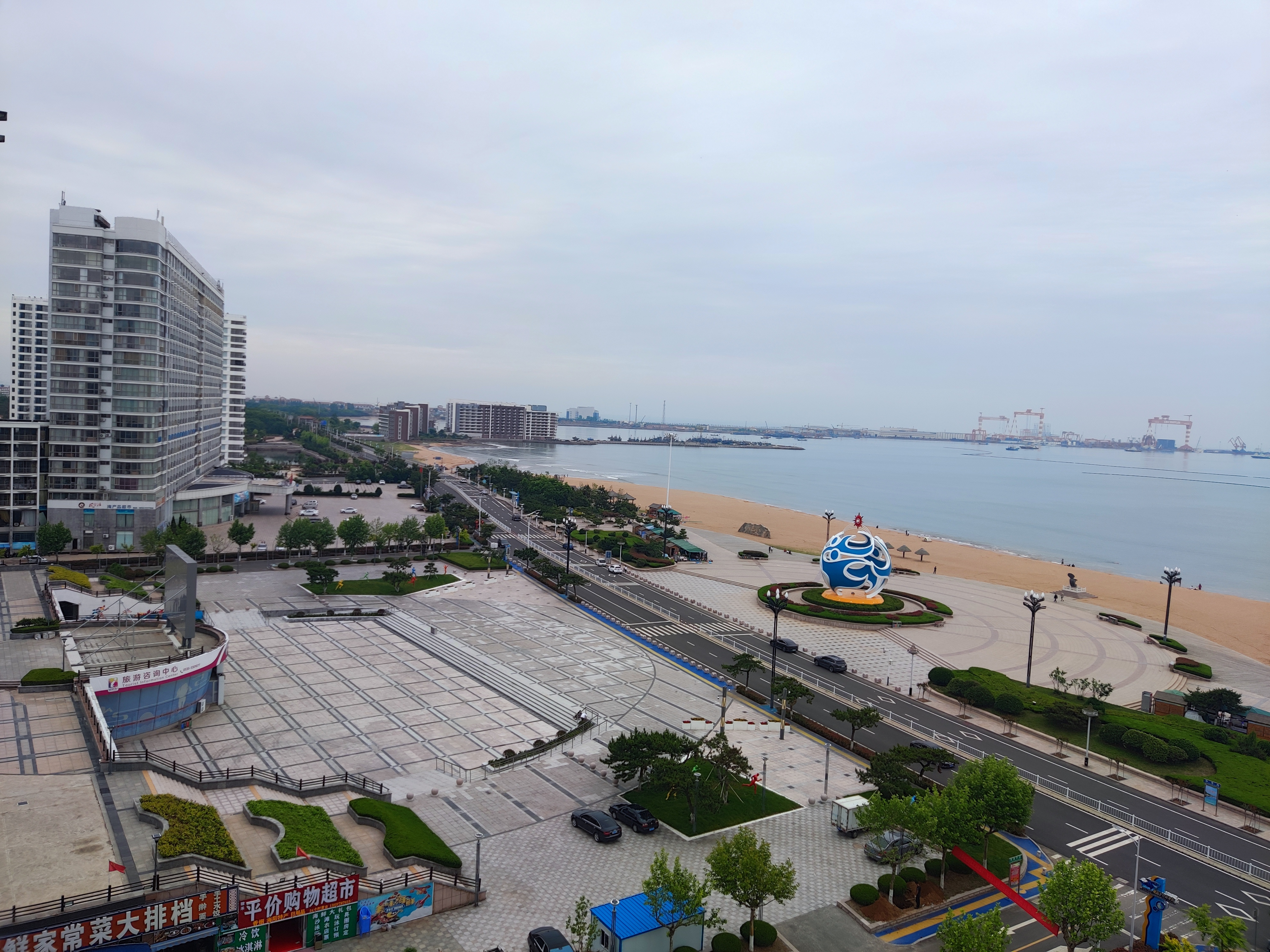
- Haiyang sand art garden

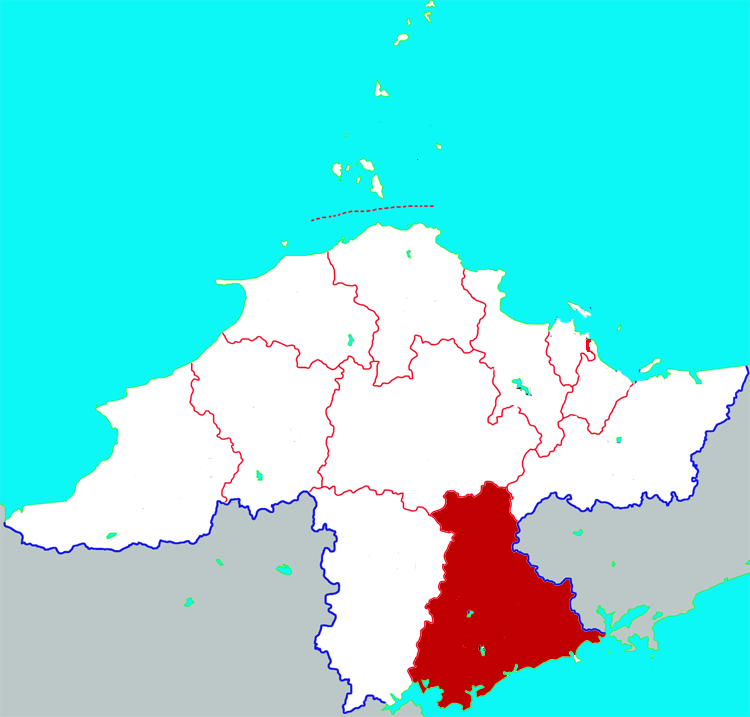
- Location in Yantai

- Location in Shandong
- Country: People's Republic of China
- Province: Shandong
- Prefecture-level city: Yantai

Area
  - Total: 1,886 km^{2} (728 sq mi)

Population (2017)
  - Total: 658,000
  - Density: 349/km^{2} (904/sq mi)
- Time zone: UTC+8 (China Standard)
- Postal code: 265100
- Website: www.haiyang.gov.cn (in Chinese)

Haiyang (simplified Chinese: 海阳; traditional Chinese: 海陽; pinyin: Hǎiyáng) is a coastal city in the Shandong province in eastern China, located on the Yellow Sea (southern) coast of the Shandong Peninsula. Its name translates directly from "yang" (阳) side of the "ocean" (海) in Mandarin. It is a county-level city under the administration of the prefecture-level city of Yantai and was the host city for the 2012 Asian Beach Games.

It is also the site of the new Haiyang Nuclear Power Plant and in 2021, became China's first city to fully utilize nuclear energy for its district heating system. Haiyang is the hometown of writer Sun Junqing (孙俊卿), whose 1962 work about the hope for a better year of farming in 1963 after the Great Chinese Famine is part of the Putonghua Proficiency Test.

== History ==
=== Early history ===
Haiyang was first settled with Laiyi people, one of the peripheral Chinese ethnic minorities, some 2,300 years ago, and was annexed into Qi in 567 BC. Haiyang was, consecutively, under administration of State of Qi in Warring States period. After Qin Shi Huang unified China, Haiyang was put under the administration of Jiaodong Commandery. It was under the Lai Prefecture (萊州) in Tang, Song, and Yuan dynasties, and Dengzhou Prefecture (登州府) in Ming dynasty.

=== From fortress to county ===
In 1389, during the early Ming dynasty Dasongwei Fortress (大嵩衛), one of the nine coastal fortresses of the time to guard against Wokou and other pirates invasions, was set up to govern (both administratively and militarily) the area known today as Haiyang. In 1734, during the Yongzheng Era, Dasongwei Fortress was officially renamed as Haiyang, which name is still used today for the land covering the south coast of Shandong Peninsula, with an area of more than 3,000 kilometers. In 1947, the newly founded communist government cut off the eastern land of Haiyang to create another county of Rushan, and since then, Haiyang's 1,886 kilometer area forms a shape that resembles a flying phoenix towards the Pacific Ocean.

=== European settlement ===
From the late 19th century until World War I, Haiyang was a coastal town in Shandong Province, located near the European settlements of Qingdao and Weihaiwei. Qingdao was leased to Germany in 1898, while Weihaiwei was leased to Britain in the same year. Trade activities in the region continued through the establishment of communist control in 1949, which brought significant changes in local governance and economic practices.

== Geography ==
=== Administrative Divisions ===
As of 2012, Haiyang administers four subdistricts and 9 towns:

Name	Chinese (S)	Hanyu Pinyin
Subdistricts		
Dongcun	东村街道	Dōngcūn Jiēdào
Fangyuan	方圆街道	Fāngyuán Jiēdào
Fengcheng	凤城街道	Fèngchéng Jiēdào
Longshan	龙山街道	Lóngshān Jiēdào
Towns		
Lidian	里店镇	Lǐdiàn Zhèn
Xiaoji	小纪镇	Xiǎojǐ Zhèn
Xingcun	行村镇	Xíngcūn zhèn
Xin'an	辛安镇	Xīn'ān Zhèn
Liugezhuang	留格庄镇	Liúgézhuāng Zhèn
Panshi	盘石镇	Pánshí Zhèn
Zhuwu	朱吴镇	Zhūwú Zhèn
Facheng	发城镇	Fāchéng Zhèn
Guocheng	郭城镇	Guōchéng Zhèn

== Climate ==
Climate data for Haiyang, elevation 41 m (135 ft), (1991–2020 normals, extremes 1981–present)
Month	Jan	Feb	Mar	Apr	May	Jun	Jul	Aug	Sep	Oct	Nov	Dec	Year
Record high °C (°F)	13.0 (55.4)	19.7 (67.5)	23.0 (73.4)	31.5 (88.7)	33.3 (91.9)	37.4 (99.3)	37.9 (100.2)	35.6 (96.1)	36.6 (97.9)	29.9 (85.8)	23.4 (74.1)	17.5 (63.5)	37.9 (100.2)
Mean daily maximum °C (°F)	3.4 (38.1)	5.8 (42.4)	10.6 (51.1)	16.8 (62.2)	22.5 (72.5)	25.7 (78.3)	28.4 (83.1)	29.1 (84.4)	26.1 (79.0)	20.4 (68.7)	12.9 (55.2)	5.8 (42.4)	17.3 (63.1)
Daily mean °C (°F)	−1.2 (29.8)	0.8 (33.4)	5.5 (41.9)	11.7 (53.1)	17.5 (63.5)	21.5 (70.7)	25.0 (77.0)	25.5 (77.9)	21.6 (70.9)	15.3 (59.5)	8.0 (46.4)	1.2 (34.2)	12.7 (54.9)
Mean daily minimum °C (°F)	−4.6 (23.7)	−2.8 (27.0)	1.6 (34.9)	7.6 (45.7)	13.5 (56.3)	18.3 (64.9)	22.4 (72.3)	22.5 (72.5)	17.7 (63.9)	11.1 (52.0)	4.2 (39.6)	−2.1 (28.2)	9.1 (48.4)
Record low °C (°F)	−13.7 (7.3)	−13.2 (8.2)	−9.2 (15.4)	−3.1 (26.4)	4.1 (39.4)	10.6 (51.1)	16.1 (61.0)	14.6 (58.3)	8.0 (46.4)	−0.5 (31.1)	−7.9 (17.8)	−12.5 (9.5)	−13.7 (7.3)
Average precipitation mm (inches)	7.4 (0.29)	13.9 (0.55)	19.1 (0.75)	41.9 (1.65)	64.8 (2.55)	82.6 (3.25)	153.0 (6.02)	174.5 (6.87)	58.7 (2.31)	24.4 (0.96)	26.5 (1.04)	12.4 (0.49)	679.2 (26.73)
Average precipitation days (≥ 0.1 mm)	2.9	2.9	4.1	5.6	7.9	8.4	12.0	11.1	6.8	4.4	4.1	3.5	73.7
Average snowy days	5.1	3.4	1.4	0.1	0	0	0	0	0	0	1.5	5.0	16.5
Average relative humidity (%)	61	60	59	61	67	77	84	81	70	65	64	63	68
Mean monthly sunshine hours	188.5	181.2	227.1	232.0	251.8	209.6	174.8	204.6	220.1	219.6	184.0	182.5	2,475.8
Percentage possible sunshine	61	59	61	59	57	48	39	49	60	64	61	61	57
Source: China Meteorological Administration all-time extreme temperature

== Economy ==
=== Haiyang Port ===
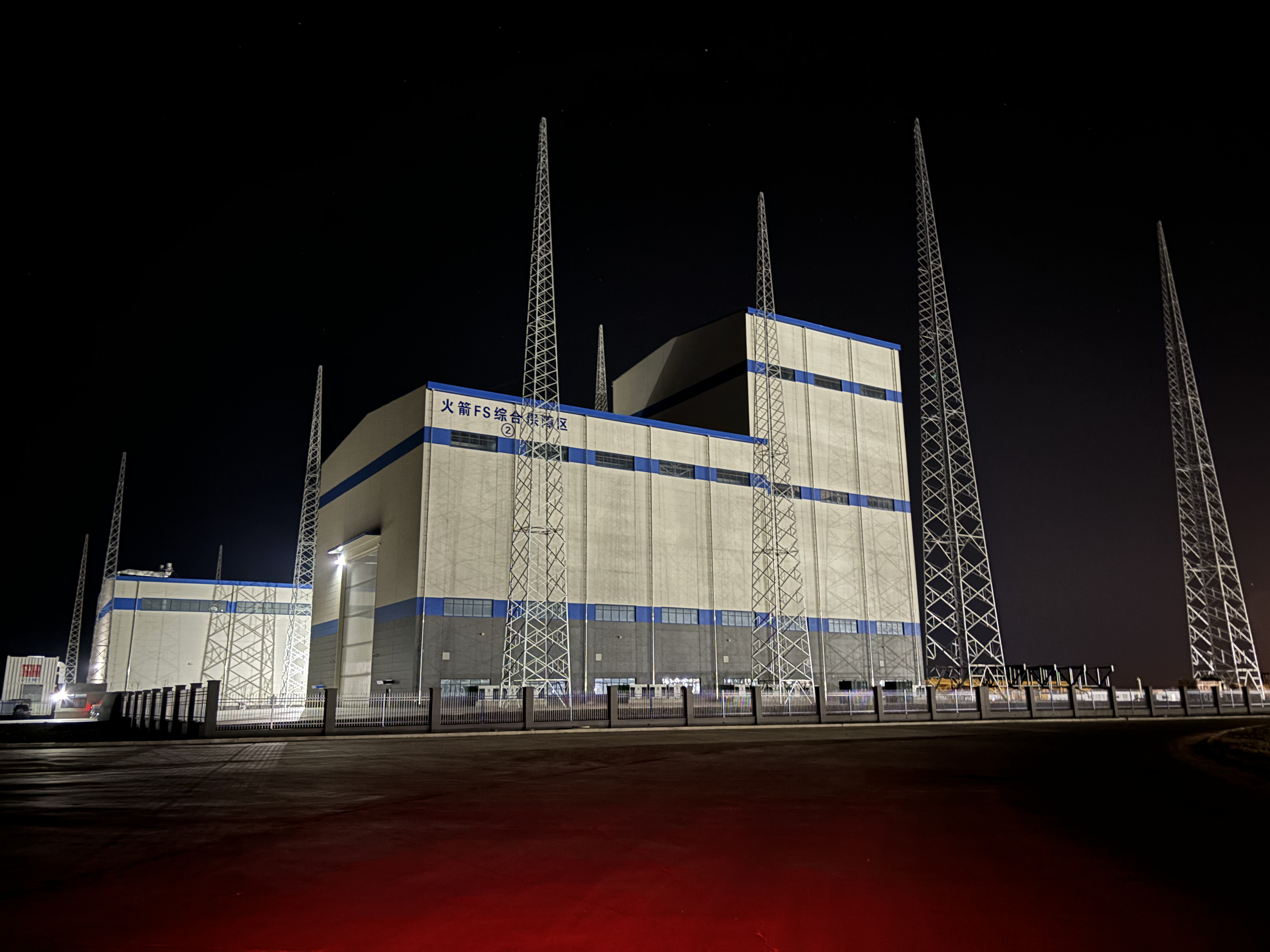
Haiyang Spaceport

Haiyang Port is one of the pivotal ports along the south coastline of Shandong Peninsula with sea routes connecting to Korea, Japan and southern Chinese ports. In May 1860, the French Navy tried to land so they could take the fortress, but their invasion attempt failed. In August 1947, the government troops retreated from the port towards Qingdao after a defeat by the communists. In April 1963, the Taiwan-based Chinese nationalist troops tried to land to take back the city and all the troops were defeated and captured by the Chinese paramilitaries. Haiyang Port is one of the trade ports for the peninsula with active export-oriented manufacturies, and is administratively under Qingdao Customs and Port Authorities.

=== Clean energy transition ===
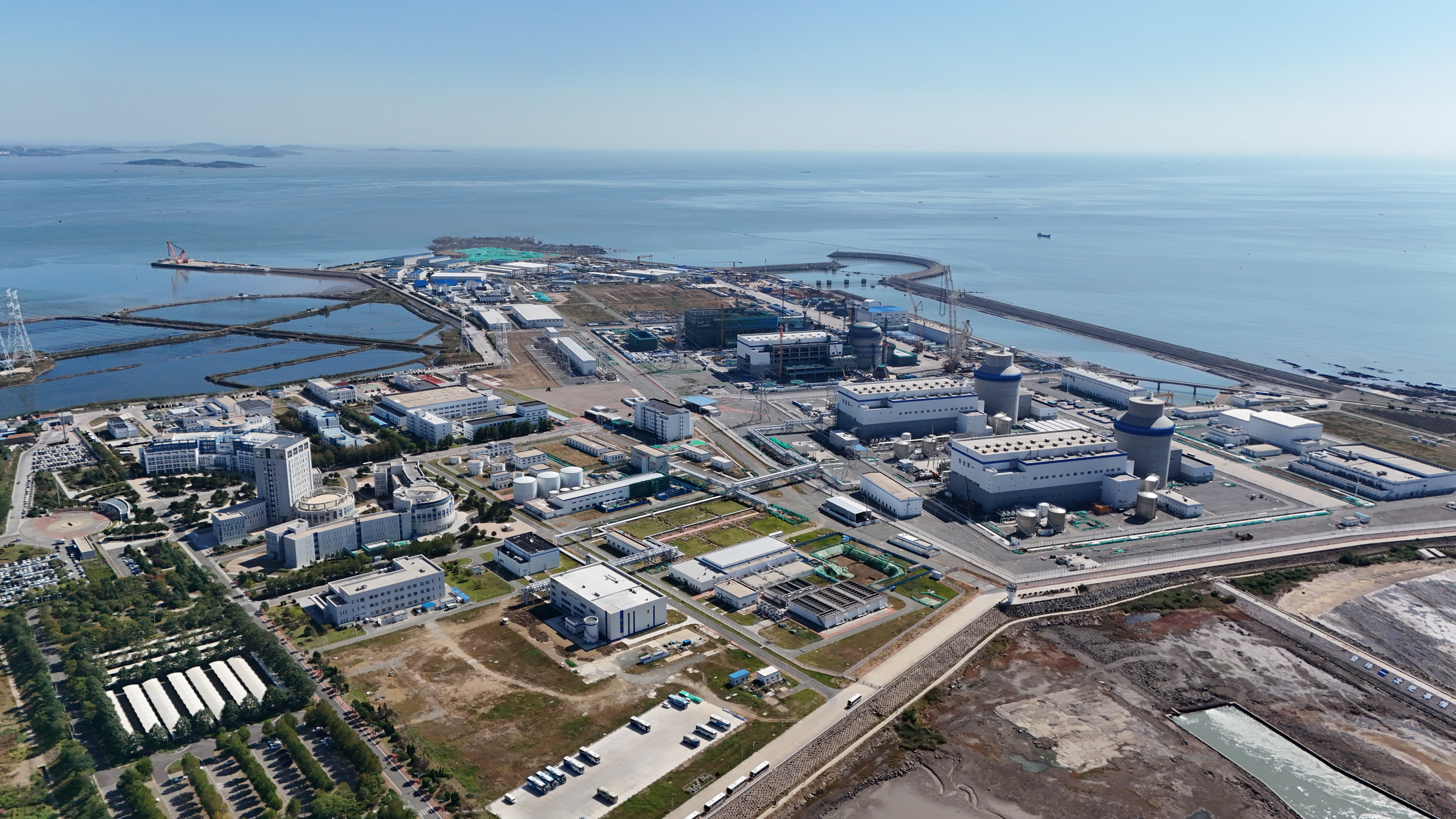
Haiyang Nuclear Power Plant

Due to natural gas shortages, the Chinese government implemented a 5-year plan in 2017 to convert half of northern China to clean energy for winter heating. By the end of 2019, the Haiyang Nuclear Power Plant provided heating to 700,000 square meters of housing via non-radioactive steam. In November 2021, Haiyang became China's first city to fully heat homes using only nuclear power, and its two nuclear plants saving a total of 180,000 tons of fossil fuel emissions per year, as well as "indirect" greenhouse gases such as nitrogen oxide and sulfur dioxide per heating season. Prior to this, the city had relied on 12 coal-fired boilers for its residential heating of its approx 200,000 residents.

== Tourism ==
=== Vacation facilities ===
Haiyang, which translates to "Ocean and Sun," is located near the Laoshan mountain range to the northwest and the Kunyu mountain range to the northeast. The city offers various recreational facilities, including beach resorts, golf courses, yachting clubs, and sports clubs for beach volleyball and basketball. Other attractions include the Phoenix Wetland Reserve, a National Forest Park, and the Coast Film Park. Additionally, Rocky Islands, about 80 kilometers off the coast, serve as another destination for visitors.

=== Leisure resorts ===
The city has a 230-kilometer coastline that supports beach sports. Its topography has been compared to that of Scotland. Over the past decade, the city has developed into a summer resort destination in China and Northeast Asia.

=== Asian Beach Games ===
Haiyang hosted the 2012 Asian Beach Games, the first ever to be held in China, which was announced by the Olympic Council of Asia in Doha on 2 December 2006.

== Twin Towns and Sister Cities ==
As of September 2019, Haiyang is twinned with Cranberry Township in Butler County, Pennsylvania.
