= Roller speed skating at the 2012 Asian Beach Games =

- Venue: Fengxiang Beach
- Dates: 17–18 June 2012

Road roller speed skating at the 2012 Asian Beach Games was held from 17 June to 18 June 2012 in Fengxiang Beach, Haiyang, China.

== Medalists ==
=== Men ===
Event	Gold	Silver	Bronze
200 m time trial	Kao Mao-chieh; Chinese Taipei	Eum Han-jun; South Korea	Lee Myung-kyu; South Korea
500 m sprint	Lee Myung-kyu; South Korea	Lo Wei-lin; Chinese Taipei	He Xin; China
10000 m points	Chen Yan-cheng; Chinese Taipei	Son Geun-seong; South Korea	Song Seung-hyun; South Korea
20000 m elimination	Son Geun-seong; South Korea	Liao Yen-sheng; Chinese Taipei	Chen Yan-cheng; Chinese Taipei

=== Women ===
Event	Gold	Silver	Bronze
200 m time trial	Zang Yinglu; China	An Yi-seul; South Korea	Shin So-yeong; South Korea
500 m sprint	Shin So-yeong; South Korea	Chen Ying-chu; Chinese Taipei	Zang Yinglu; China
10000 m points	Guo Dan; China	Woo Hyo-sook; South Korea	Yang Ho-chen; Chinese Taipei
20000 m elimination	Li Meng-chu; Chinese Taipei	Lee Seul; South Korea	Yang Ho-chen; Chinese Taipei

== Medal table ==
Rank	Nation	Gold	Silver	Bronze	Total
1	South Korea (KOR)	3	5	3	11
2	Chinese Taipei (TPE)	3	3	3	9
3	China (CHN)	2	0	2	4
Totals (3 entries)		8	8	8	24

== Results ==
=== Men ===
==== 200 m time trial ====
17 June

Rank	Athlete	Qual.	Final
1st place, gold medalist(s)	Kao Mao-chieh (TPE)	17.363	17.042
2nd place, silver medalist(s)	Eum Han-jun (KOR)	17.443	17.088
3rd place, bronze medalist(s)	Lee Myung-kyu (KOR)	17.148	17.253
4	Lo Wei-lin (TPE)	17.610	17.277
5	Allan Chandra Moedjiono (INA)	17.294	17.426
6	Han Chong (CHN)	17.873	17.658
7	He Xin (CHN)	17.838	17.774
8	Hossein Manshidi (IRI)	18.122	17.867
9	Oky Andrianto (INA)	18.084	17.912
10	Kandhaswamy Hariharan (IND)	18.604	18.378
11	Anthony Chung (HKG)	18.540	18.393
12	Mehrdad Sabetnia (IRI)	18.675	18.623
13	Stephen Paul (IND)	18.684	
14	Chutipon Nakarungsu (THA)	19.113	
15	Keita Suga (JPN)	19.566	
16	Takashi Komatsu (JPN)	19.830	
17	Natthapong Chansiri (THA)	20.665	
18	Sumon Hussion (BAN)	21.513	
19	Shahidur Rahaman Rubel (BAN)	21.977	
20	Nguyễn Văn An (VIE)	22.009	
21	Lâm Quốc Chiến (VIE)	22.577	

==== 500 m sprint ====
18 June

===== Heats =====
Rank	Athlete	Time
Heat 1
1	Kao Mao-chieh (TPE)	40.242
2	He Xin (CHN)	40.245
3	Johanes Wihardja (INA)	40.289
4	Takashi Komatsu (JPN)	40.924
5	Natthapong Chansiri (THA)	45.562
Heat 2
1	Hossein Manshidi (IRI)	41.169
2	Vikram Ingale (IND)	41.224
3	Eum Han-jun (KOR)	41.298
4	Hiroki Totori (JPN)	42.105
5	Md Asif Iqbal (BAN)	48.249
Heat 3
1	Lee Myung-kyu (KOR)	41.922
2	Anthony Chung (HKG)	41.999
3	Ren Weishi (CHN)	42.114
4	Chutipon Nakarungsu (THA)	42.151
5	Nguyễn Đức Mạnh (VIE)	50.025
Heat 4
1	Lo Wei-lin (TPE)	41.335
2	Allan Chandra Moedjiono (INA)	41.501
3	Stephen Paul (IND)	41.709
4	Mohammad Arezoumand (IRI)	41.918
5	Lâm Quốc Chiến (VIE)	53.430

===== Semifinals =====
Rank	Athlete	Time
Heat 1
1	Lo Wei-lin (TPE)	39.780
2	He Xin (CHN)	39.834
3	Allan Chandra Moedjiono (INA)	39.993
4	Kao Mao-chieh (TPE)	40.289
Heat 2
1	Lee Myung-kyu (KOR)	39.684
2	Vikram Ingale (IND)	40.462
3	Hossein Manshidi (IRI)	40.563
4	Anthony Chung (HKG)	40.626

===== Final =====
Rank	Athlete	Time
1st place, gold medalist(s)	Lee Myung-kyu (KOR)	40.040
2nd place, silver medalist(s)	Lo Wei-lin (TPE)	40.087
3rd place, bronze medalist(s)	He Xin (CHN)	40.102
4	Vikram Ingale (IND)	40.798

==== 10000 m points ====
17 June

Rank	Athlete	Score
1st place, gold medalist(s)	Chen Yan-cheng (TPE)	15
2nd place, silver medalist(s)	Son Geun-seong (KOR)	14
3rd place, bronze medalist(s)	Song Seung-hyun (KOR)	11
4	Liao Yen-sheng (TPE)	9
5	Cong Siyuan (CHN)	3
6	Huo Jiaming (CHN)	2
7	Vikram Ingale (IND)	0
8	Hideaki Kita (JPN)	0
9	Kandhaswamy Hariharan (IND)	0
10	Pouria Ghasempour (IRI)	EL
11	Keita Suga (JPN)	EL
12	Oky Andrianto (INA)	EL
13	Tse On Ho (HKG)	EL
14	Johanes Wihardja (INA)	EL
15	Witsawachit Lunpeng (THA)	EL
16	Nopporn Kaewdilok (THA)	EL
17	Sumon Hussion (BAN)	EL
18	Shahidur Rahaman Rubel (BAN)	EL
19	Nguyễn Đức Mạnh (VIE)	EL
20	Nguyễn Văn An (VIE)	EL
21	Mohammad Arezoumand (IRI)	EL

==== 20000 m elimination ====
18 June

Rank	Athlete	Time
1st place, gold medalist(s)	Son Geun-seong (KOR)	32:44.255
2nd place, silver medalist(s)	Liao Yen-sheng (TPE)	32:44.690
3rd place, bronze medalist(s)	Chen Yan-cheng (TPE)	32:44.985
4	Song Seung-hyun (KOR)	32:46.090
5	Mit Virajbhai Shah (IND)	33:25.839
—	Oky Andrianto (INA)	EL
—	Hideaki Kita (JPN)	EL
—	Kandhaswamy Hariharan (IND)	EL
—	Pouria Ghasempour (IRI)	EL
—	Song Yang (CHN)	EL
—	Hiroki Totori (JPN)	EL
—	Arif Rachman (INA)	EL
—	Tse On Ho (HKG)	EL
—	Guo Huan (CHN)	EL
—	Witsawachit Lunpeng (THA)	EL
—	Nopporn Kaewdilok (THA)	EL
—	Mehrdad Sabetnia (IRI)	EL
—	Md Asif Iqbal (BAN)	EL

=== Women ===
==== 200 m time trial ====
17 June

Rank	Athlete	Qual.	Final
1st place, gold medalist(s)	Zang Yinglu (CHN)	20.893	18.983
2nd place, silver medalist(s)	An Yi-seul (KOR)	19.383	19.008
3rd place, bronze medalist(s)	Shin So-yeong (KOR)	19.918	19.080
4	Chen Ying-chu (TPE)	20.015	19.261
5	Du Jingwen (CHN)	20.093	19.929
6	Eri Marina Yo (INA)	20.920	20.229
7	Kuo Yen-ling (TPE)	20.792	20.692
8	Shraddha Reedy (IND)	21.215	21.304
9	Vanessa Wong (HKG)	21.649	21.374
10	Karinne Tam (HKG)	21.838	21.574
11	Sylvia Setiawan (INA)	21.330	22.325
12	Anoli Aukit Shah (IND)	23.463	22.521

==== 500 m sprint ====
18 June

===== Heats =====
Rank	Athlete	Time
Heat 1
1	Zang Yinglu (CHN)	54.260
2	Vanessa Wong (HKG)	55.199
3	Shraddha Reedy (IND)	55.293
Heat 2
1	An Yi-seul (KOR)	46.795
2	Kuo Yen-ling (TPE)	46.888
3	Karinne Tam (HKG)	47.573
Heat 3
1	Shin So-yeong (KOR)	47.736
2	Eri Marina Yo (INA)	47.859
3	Anindya Wening Melati (INA)	48.385
Heat 4
1	Chen Ying-chu (TPE)	55.885
2	Fan Chuqian (CHN)	56.229
3	Anoli Aukit Shah (IND)	57.865

===== Semifinals =====
Rank	Athlete	Time
Heat 1
1	Zang Yinglu (CHN)	48.298
2	Chen Ying-chu (TPE)	48.299
3	Fan Chuqian (CHN)	48.335
4	Vanessa Wong (HKG)	49.513
Heat 2
1	An Yi-seul (KOR)	44.110
2	Shin So-yeong (KOR)	44.167
3	Eri Marina Yo (INA)	44.264
4	Kuo Yen-ling (TPE)	45.032

===== Final =====
Rank	Athlete	Time
1st place, gold medalist(s)	Shin So-yeong (KOR)	42.944
2nd place, silver medalist(s)	Chen Ying-chu (TPE)	42.989
3rd place, bronze medalist(s)	Zang Yinglu (CHN)	43.090
4	An Yi-seul (KOR)	43.105

==== 10000 m points ====
17 June

Rank	Athlete	Score
1st place, gold medalist(s)	Guo Dan (CHN)	18
2nd place, silver medalist(s)	Woo Hyo-sook (KOR)	15
3rd place, bronze medalist(s)	Yang Ho-chen (TPE)	10
4	Lee Seul (KOR)	7
5	Ajeng Anindya Prasalita (INA)	3
6	Li Lisha (CHN)	1
7	Li Meng-chu (TPE)	EL
8	Aarathy Kasturi Raj (IND)	EL
9	Kanika Bhalla (IND)	EL
10	Sylvia Setiawan (INA)	EL
11	Karinne Tam (HKG)	EL

==== 20000 m elimination ====
18 June

Rank	Athlete	Time
1st place, gold medalist(s)	Li Meng-chu (TPE)	41:37.347
2nd place, silver medalist(s)	Lee Seul (KOR)	41:37.351
3rd place, bronze medalist(s)	Yang Ho-chen (TPE)	43:02.154
4	Guo Dan (CHN)	43:02.178
5	Woo Hyo-sook (KOR)	43:02.588
—	Ajeng Anindya Prasalita (INA)	EL
—	Yuan Yue (CHN)	EL
—	Kanika Bhalla (IND)	EL
—	Vanessa Wong (HKG)	EL
—	Aarathy Kasturi Raj (IND)	EL
—	Anindya Wening Melati (INA)	EL
