= Sailing at the 2012 Asian Beach Games =

- Venue: Fengxiang Beach
- Dates: 17–21 June 2012

Sailing (as Windsurfing) at the 2012 Asian Beach Games was held from 17 to 21 June 2012 at Fengxiang Beach in Haiyang, China. The host country won both gold medals in this event.

== Medalists ==
Event	Gold	Silver	Bronze
Men's Techno 293	Wei Bipeng; China	Navin Singsart; Thailand	Natthaphong Phonoppharat; Thailand
Women's Techno 293	Feng Yihua; China	Siripon Kaewduang-ngam; Thailand	Wu Yiping; China

== Medal table ==
Rank	Nation	Gold	Silver	Bronze	Total
1	China (CHN)	2	0	1	3
2	Thailand (THA)	0	2	1	3
Totals (2 entries)		2	2	2	6

== Results ==
=== Men's Techno 293 ===
17–21 June

Rank	Athlete	Race											Total
Rank	Athlete	1	2	3	4	5	6	7	8	9	10	11	Total
1st place, gold medalist(s)	Wei Bipeng (CHN)	1	2	1	1	1	1	1	2	1	1	~~(4)~~	12
2nd place, silver medalist(s)	Navin Singsart (THA)	2	1	2	2	~~(3)~~	2	3	1	3	3	2	21
3rd place, bronze medalist(s)	Natthaphong Phonoppharat (THA)	3	4	3	4	2	4	~~(6)~~	3	2	2	1	28
4	Zhou Guanxing (CHN)	4	5	4	3	4	3	4	5	4	5	~~(7)~~	41
5	Oka Sulaksana (INA)	5	3	5	5	5	5	5	4	5	~~(6)~~	5	47
6	Astika Oye Wahyudi (INA)	~~(7)~~	6	6	6	6	6	2	6	7	4	3	52
7	Chameera Lakshan (SRI)	~~(12)~~	8	8	8	9	7	7	7	6	10	6	76
8	Park Kang-il (KOR)	6	7	7	9	7	9	8	8	~~(14)~~	7	8	76
9	Daniel Fauzi (MAS)	8	10	9	7	8	8	9	9	9	9	~~(11)~~	86
10	Qasim Abbas (PAK)	11	11	10	~~(12)~~	10	11	11	10	8	8	10	100
11	Kim Jung-wook (KOR)	10	9	~~(13)~~	10	11	10	12	11	10	11	9	103
12	Khalid Hussain (PAK)	9	13	11	11	13	12	10	12	12	~~(14)~~	14	117
13	Kumbudathperuma Priyantha (SRI)	13	12	12	13	12	13	13	13	11	~~(14)~~	14	126

=== Women's Techno 293 ===
17–21 June

Rank	Athlete	Race											Total
Rank	Athlete	1	2	3	4	5	6	7	8	9	10	11	Total
1st place, gold medalist(s)	Feng Yihua (CHN)	1	1	1	1	2	1	3	1	1	3	~~(4)~~	15
2nd place, silver medalist(s)	Siripon Kaewduang-ngam (THA)	3	6	3	~~(8)~~	1	2	2	2	8	1	1	29
3rd place, bronze medalist(s)	Wu Yiping (CHN)	2	3	2	2	5	7	~~(9)~~	8	2	2	3	36
4	Ma Kwan Ching (HKG)	4	2	6	3	~~(9)~~	5	5	5	4	5	2	41
5	Hoiriyah (INA)	~~(8)~~	7	7	4	3	3	1	6	5	4	6	46
6	Sarocha Prumprai (THA)	7	~~(9)~~	4	5	4	4	4	4	3	8	9	52
7	Ratiah (INA)	5	8	5	7	6	~~(9)~~	6	7	6	6	8	64
8	Katherine Ong (MAS)	~~(9)~~	5	9	6	7	8	8	3	9	7	5	67
9	Ruth Mow (SIN)	6	4	8	~~(9)~~	8	6	7	9	7	9	7	71
10	Yoo Eun-hye (KOR)	~~(12)~~	10	10	10	10	11	12	12	10	10	10	105
11	Gang Su-ji (KOR)	10	~~(12)~~	12	11	11	10	12	12	11	11	11	111
