= Beach volleyball at the 2012 Asian Beach Games =

- Venue: Fengxiang Beach
- Dates: 12–18 June 2012

Beach volleyball at the 2012 Asian Beach Games was held from 12 June to 18 June 2012 in Fengxiang Beach, Haiyang, China.

== Medalists ==
Event	Gold	Silver	Bronze
Men	Indonesia; Ade Candra Rachmawan; Koko Prasetyo Darkuncoro	Kazakhstan; Dmitriy Yakovlev; Alexey Kuleshov	Kazakhstan; Alexandr Dyachenko; Alexey Sidorenko
Women	Thailand; Varapatsorn Radarong; Tanarattha Udomchavee	China; Hu Anna; Chen Chunxia	Chinese Taipei; Kou Nai-han; Chang Hui-min

== Medal table ==
Rank	Nation	Gold	Silver	Bronze	Total
1	Indonesia (INA)	1	0	0	1
1	Thailand (THA)	1	0	0	1
3	Kazakhstan (KAZ)	0	1	1	2
4	China (CHN)	0	1	0	1
5	Chinese Taipei (TPE)	0	0	1	1
Totals (5 entries)		2	2	2	6

== Results ==
=== Men ===
==== Preliminary round ====
===== Group A =====
Pos	Team	Pld	W	L	Pts	SW	SL	SR	SPW	SPL	SPR
1	Dyachenko–Sidorenko (KAZ)	2	2	0	4	4	0	MAX	84	34	2.471
2	Wong–Wong (HKG)	2	1	1	3	2	2	1.000	64	55	1.164
3	Bozorboev–Khudoyberdiev (TJK)	2	0	2	2	0	4	0.000	25	84	0.298

Source: AVC

Date		Score		Set 1	Set 2	Set 3
12 Jun	Wong–Wong (HKG)	2–0	Bozorboev–Khudoyberdiev (TJK)	21–7	21–6	
13 Jun	Dyachenko–Sidorenko (KAZ)	2–0	Bozorboev–Khudoyberdiev (TJK)	21–5	21–7	
14 Jun	Dyachenko–Sidorenko (KAZ)	2–0	Wong–Wong (HKG)	21–9	21–13	

===== Group B =====
Pos	Team	Pld	W	L	Pts	SW	SL	SR	SPW	SPL	SPR
1	Farrokhi–Salagh (IRI)	2	2	0	4	4	0	MAX	84	22	3.818
2	Naranbayar–Myagmarsüren (MGL)	2	1	1	3	2	3	0.667	70	94	0.745
3	Azizi–Sedeqi (AFG)	2	0	2	2	1	4	0.250	59	97	0.608

Source: AVC

Date		Score		Set 1	Set 2	Set 3
12 Jun	Naranbayar–Myagmarsüren (MGL)	2–1	Azizi–Sedeqi (AFG)	18–21	21–17	16–14
13 Jun	Farrokhi–Salagh (IRI)	2–0	Azizi–Sedeqi (AFG)	21–1	21–6	
14 Jun	Farrokhi–Salagh (IRI)	2–0	Naranbayar–Myagmarsüren (MGL)	21–8	21–7	

===== Group C =====
Pos	Team	Pld	W	L	Pts	SW	SL	SR	SPW	SPL	SPR
1	Sangkhachot–Sukto (THA)	2	2	0	4	4	0	MAX	84	38	2.211
2	Choi–Cheong (MAC)	2	1	1	3	2	3	0.667	74	88	0.841
3	Shah–Kunwar (NEP)	2	0	2	2	1	4	0.250	62	94	0.660

Source: AVC

Date		Score		Set 1	Set 2	Set 3
12 Jun	Shah–Kunwar (NEP)	1–2	Choi–Cheong (MAC)	17–21	21–16	8–15
13 Jun	Sangkhachot–Sukto (THA)	2–0	Choi–Cheong (MAC)	21–11	21–11	
14 Jun	Sangkhachot–Sukto (THA)	2–0	Shah–Kunwar (NEP)	21–8	21–8	

===== Group D =====
Pos	Team	Pld	W	L	Pts	SW	SL	SR	SPW	SPL	SPR
1	Kiew–Nordin (MAS)	2	2	0	4	4	1	4.000	96	60	1.600
2	Al-Arqan–Tafesh (PLE)	2	1	1	3	3	2	1.500	86	79	1.089
3	Chalmashbekov–Dumanaev (KGZ)	2	0	2	2	0	4	0.000	41	84	0.488

Source: AVC

Date		Score		Set 1	Set 2	Set 3
12 Jun	Al-Arqan–Tafesh (PLE)	2–0	Chalmashbekov–Dumanaev (KGZ)	21–13	21–12	
13 Jun	Kiew–Nordin (MAS)	2–0	Chalmashbekov–Dumanaev (KGZ)	21–8	21–8	
14 Jun	Kiew–Nordin (MAS)	2–1	Al-Arqan–Tafesh (PLE)	21–13	18–21	15–10

===== Group E =====
Pos	Team	Pld	W	L	Pts	SW	SL	SR	SPW	SPL	SPR
1	Rachmawan–Darkuncoro (INA)	2	2	0	4	4	0	MAX	84	42	2.000
2	Ebrahim–Marhoon (BRN)	2	1	1	3	2	2	1.000	66	70	0.943
3	Safi–Sadat (AFG)	2	0	2	2	0	4	0.000	46	84	0.548

Source: AVC

Date		Score		Set 1	Set 2	Set 3
12 Jun	Ebrahim–Marhoon (BRN)	2–0	Safi–Sadat (AFG)	21–13	21–15	
13 Jun	Rachmawan–Darkuncoro (INA)	2–0	Safi–Sadat (AFG)	21–6	21–12	
14 Jun	Rachmawan–Darkuncoro (INA)	2–0	Ebrahim–Marhoon (BRN)	21–11	21–13	

===== Group F =====
Pos	Team	Pld	W	L	Pts	SW	SL	SR	SPW	SPL	SPR
1	Yakovlev–Kuleshov (KAZ)	2	2	0	4	4	0	MAX	84	65	1.292
2	Poothathan–John (IND)	2	1	1	3	2	2	1.000	74	73	1.014
3	Moeurng–Phat (CAM)	2	0	2	2	0	4	0.000	64	84	0.762

Source: AVC

Date		Score		Set 1	Set 2	Set 3
12 Jun	Yakovlev–Kuleshov (KAZ)	2–0	Moeurng–Phat (CAM)	21–15	21–18	
13 Jun	Yakovlev–Kuleshov (KAZ)	2–0	Poothathan–John (IND)	21–15	21–17	
14 Jun	Poothathan–John (IND)	2–0	Moeurng–Phat (CAM)	21–14	21–17	

===== Group G =====
Pos	Team	Pld	W	L	Pts	SW	SL	SR	SPW	SPL	SPR
1	Santosa–Fahriansyah (INA)	2	2	0	4	4	0	MAX	84	52	1.615
2	Kumara–Yapa (SRI)	2	1	1	3	2	2	1.000	73	63	1.159
3	Akmuradow–Batyrow (TKM)	2	0	2	2	0	4	0.000	42	84	0.500

Source: AVC

Date		Score		Set 1	Set 2	Set 3
12 Jun	Kumara–Yapa (SRI)	2–0	Akmuradow–Batyrow (TKM)	21–9	21–12	
13 Jun	Santosa–Fahriansyah (INA)	2–0	Akmuradow–Batyrow (TKM)	21–12	21–9	
14 Jun	Santosa–Fahriansyah (INA)	2–0	Kumara–Yapa (SRI)	21–18	21–13	

===== Group H =====
Pos	Team	Pld	W	L	Pts	SW	SL	SR	SPW	SPL	SPR
1	Al-Shereiqi–Al-Subhi (OMA)	2	2	0	4	4	1	4.000	96	64	1.500
2	Hidaka–Hasegawa (JPN)	2	1	1	3	3	2	1.500	92	71	1.296
3	Ahmed–Hossain (BAN)	2	0	2	2	0	4	0.000	31	84	0.369

Source: AVC

Date		Score		Set 1	Set 2	Set 3
12 Jun	Hidaka–Hasegawa (JPN)	2–0	Ahmed–Hossain (BAN)	21–9	21–8	
13 Jun	Al-Shereiqi–Al-Subhi (OMA)	2–0	Ahmed–Hossain (BAN)	21–9	21–5	
14 Jun	Al-Shereiqi–Al-Subhi (OMA)	2–1	Hidaka–Hasegawa (JPN)	18–21	21–17	15–12

===== Group I =====
Pos	Team	Pld	W	L	Pts	SW	SL	SR	SPW	SPL	SPR
1	Al-Housni–Al-Balushi (OMA)	2	2	0	4	4	0	MAX	84	57	1.474
2	Al-Awlaqi–Al-Galal (YEM)	2	1	1	3	2	3	0.667	86	92	0.935
3	Aryal–Magar (NEP)	2	0	2	2	1	4	0.250	75	96	0.781

Source: AVC

Date		Score		Set 1	Set 2	Set 3
12 Jun	Aryal–Magar (NEP)	1–2	Al-Awlaqi–Al-Galal (YEM)	21–18	17–21	12–15
13 Jun	Al-Housni–Al-Balushi (OMA)	2–0	Al-Awlaqi–Al-Galal (YEM)	21–19	21–13	
14 Jun	Al-Housni–Al-Balushi (OMA)	2–0	Aryal–Magar (NEP)	21–6	21–19	

===== Group J =====
Pos	Team	Pld	W	L	Pts	SW	SL	SR	SPW	SPL	SPR
1	Pollueang–Toyam (THA)	2	2	0	4	4	0	MAX	84	59	1.424
2	Mahfoudh–Mohammed (YEM)	2	1	1	3	2	2	1.000	78	78	1.000
3	Taing–Lim (CAM)	2	0	2	2	0	4	0.000	59	84	0.702

Source: AVC

Date		Score		Set 1	Set 2	Set 3
12 Jun	Taing–Lim (CAM)	0–2	Mahfoudh–Mohammed (YEM)	19–21	17–21	
13 Jun	Pollueang–Toyam (THA)	2–0	Mahfoudh–Mohammed (YEM)	21–19	21–17	
14 Jun	Pollueang–Toyam (THA)	2–0	Taing–Lim (CAM)	21–10	21–13	

===== Group K =====
Pos	Team	Pld	W	L	Pts	SW	SL	SR	SPW	SPL	SPR
1	Gholipouri–Houshmand (IRI)	2	2	0	4	4	0	MAX	84	51	1.647
2	Kwok–Wong (HKG)	2	1	1	3	2	2	1.000	77	61	1.262
3	Al-Asaaf–Amir (IOA)	2	0	2	2	0	4	0.000	35	84	0.417

Source: AVC

Date		Score		Set 1	Set 2	Set 3
12 Jun	Kwok–Wong (HKG)	2–0	Al-Asaaf–Amir (IOA)	21–6	21–13	
13 Jun	Gholipouri–Houshmand (IRI)	2–0	Al-Asaaf–Amir (IOA)	21–8	21–8	
14 Jun	Gholipouri–Houshmand (IRI)	2–0	Kwok–Wong (HKG)	21–18	21–17	

===== Group L =====
Pos	Team	Pld	W	L	Pts	SW	SL	SR	SPW	SPL	SPR
1	Qarqoor–Marhoon (BRN)	2	2	0	4	4	0	MAX	85	59	1.441
2	Lâm–Phạm (VIE)	2	1	1	3	2	2	1.000	81	74	1.095
3	Adam–Abdul Hameed (MDV)	2	0	2	2	0	4	0.000	51	84	0.607

Source: AVC

Date		Score		Set 1	Set 2	Set 3
12 Jun	Adam–Abdul Hameed (MDV)	0–2	Qarqoor–Marhoon (BRN)	16–21	4–21	
13 Jun	Lâm–Phạm (VIE)	0–2	Qarqoor–Marhoon (BRN)	19–21	20–22	
14 Jun	Lâm–Phạm (VIE)	2–0	Adam–Abdul Hameed (MDV)	21–17	21–14	

===== Group M =====
Pos	Team	Pld	W	L	Pts	SW	SL	SR	SPW	SPL	SPR
1	Ekanayaka–Peiris (SRI)	2	2	0	4	4	0	MAX	84	48	1.750
2	Hatabe–Murakami (JPN)	2	1	1	3	2	2	1.000	70	61	1.148
3	Correia–Santos (TLS)	2	0	2	2	0	4	0.000	39	84	0.464

Source: AVC

Date		Score		Set 1	Set 2	Set 3
12 Jun	Correia–Santos (TLS)	0–2	Hatabe–Murakami (JPN)	11–21	8–21	
13 Jun	Ekanayaka–Peiris (SRI)	2–0	Hatabe–Murakami (JPN)	21–19	21–9	
14 Jun	Ekanayaka–Peiris (SRI)	2–0	Correia–Santos (TLS)	21–8	21–12	

===== Group N =====
Pos	Team	Pld	W	L	Pts	SW	SL	SR	SPW	SPL	SPR
1	Li–Zhang (CHN)	2	2	0	4	4	0	MAX	84	46	1.826
2	Soares–Xavier (TLS)	2	1	1	3	2	3	0.667	76	80	0.950
3	Abdul Wahid–Sajid (MDV)	2	0	2	2	1	4	0.250	62	96	0.646

Source: AVC

Date		Score		Set 1	Set 2	Set 3
12 Jun	Soares–Xavier (TLS)	0–2	Li–Zhang (CHN)	11–21	11–21	
13 Jun	Abdul Wahid–Sajid (MDV)	0–2	Li–Zhang (CHN)	9–21	15–21	
14 Jun	Abdul Wahid–Sajid (MDV)	1–2	Soares–Xavier (TLS)	21–18	8–21	9–15

===== Group O =====
Pos	Team	Pld	W	L	Pts	SW	SL	SR	SPW	SPL	SPR
1	Li–Wu (CHN)	2	2	0	4	4	0	MAX	84	30	2.800
2	Malik–Assam (QAT)	2	1	1	3	2	2	1.000	59	66	0.894
3	Lam–Wong (MAC)	2	0	2	2	0	4	0.000	37	84	0.440

Source: AVC

Date		Score		Set 1	Set 2	Set 3
12 Jun	Malik–Assam (QAT)	2–0	Lam–Wong (MAC)	21–8	21–16	
13 Jun	Li–Wu (CHN)	2–0	Lam–Wong (MAC)	21–7	21–6	
14 Jun	Li–Wu (CHN)	2–0	Malik–Assam (QAT)	21–8	21–9	

===== Group P =====
Pos	Team	Pld	W	L	Pts	SW	SL	SR	SPW	SPL	SPR
1	Nguyễn–Nguyễn (VIE)	3	3	0	6	6	0	MAX	84	64	1.313
2	Khallouf–Abdelrasoul (QAT)	3	2	1	5	4	2	2.000	74	72	1.028
3	Hojaýew–Kiçiýew (TKM)	3	1	2	4	2	4	0.500	62	84	0.738
4	Ibragimov–Madzhidov (TJK)	3	0	3	2	0	6	0.000	0	126	0.000

Source: AVC

Date		Score		Set 1	Set 2	Set 3
12 Jun	Nguyễn–Nguyễn (VIE)	2–0	Hojaýew–Kiçiýew (TKM)	21–14	21–18	
12 Jun	Khallouf–Abdelrasoul (QAT)	2–0	Ibragimov–Madzhidov (TJK)	Walkover		
13 Jun	Nguyễn–Nguyễn (VIE)	2–0	Ibragimov–Madzhidov (TJK)	Walkover		
13 Jun	Khallouf–Abdelrasoul (QAT)	2–0	Hojaýew–Kiçiýew (TKM)	21–14	21–16	
14 Jun	Nguyễn–Nguyễn (VIE)	2–0	Khallouf–Abdelrasoul (QAT)	21–16	21–16	
14 Jun	Ibragimov–Madzhidov (TJK)	0–2	Hojaýew–Kiçiýew (TKM)	Walkover		

==== Knockout round ====
Round of 16; 15 June
Dyachenko–Sidorenko (KAZ)	21	21
Nguyễn–Nguyễn (VIE)	10	15
Al-Housni–Al-Balushi (OMA)	16	16
Al-Shereiqi–Al-Subhi (OMA)	21	21
Rachmawan–Darkuncoro (INA)	21	21
Qarqoor–Marhoon (BRN)	13	12
Ekanayaka–Peiris (SRI)	17	16
Kiew–Nordin (MAS)	21	21
Sangkhachot–Sukto (THA)	17	14
Li–Zhang (CHN)	21	21
Gholipouri–Houshmand (IRI)	13	8
Yakovlev–Kuleshov (KAZ)	21	21
Santosa–Fahriansyah (INA)	21	21
Pollueang–Toyam (THA)	19	16
Li–Wu (CHN)	11	21	12
Farrokhi–Salagh (IRI)	21	18	15

Quarterfinals; 16 June
Dyachenko–Sidorenko (KAZ)	21	21
Al-Shereiqi–Al-Subhi (OMA)	19	11
Rachmawan–Darkuncoro (INA)	21	21
Kiew–Nordin (MAS)	15	16
Li–Zhang (CHN)	21	15	16
Yakovlev–Kuleshov (KAZ)	16	21	18
Santosa–Fahriansyah (INA)	11	21	15
Farrokhi–Salagh (IRI)	21	18	13

Semifinals; 17 June
Dyachenko–Sidorenko (KAZ)	21	28	10
Rachmawan–Darkuncoro (INA)	17	30	15
Yakovlev–Kuleshov (KAZ)	21	21
Santosa–Fahriansyah (INA)	19	18

Gold medal match 18 June
Rachmawan–Darkuncoro (INA)	22	21
Yakovlev–Kuleshov (KAZ)	20	17
Bronze medal match
Dyachenko–Sidorenko (KAZ)	21	21
Santosa–Fahriansyah (INA)	13	12

=== Women ===
==== Preliminary round ====
===== Group S =====
Pos	Team	Pld	W	L	Pts	SW	SL	SR	SPW	SPL	SPR
1	Sannok–Tenpaksee (THA)	2	2	0	4	4	0	MAX	84	34	2.471
2	Chan–Tse (HKG)	2	1	1	3	2	2	1.000	65	62	1.048
3	Sanches–Belo (TLS)	2	0	2	2	0	4	0.000	31	84	0.369

Source: AVC

Date		Score		Set 1	Set 2	Set 3
12 Jun	Chan–Tse (HKG)	2–0	Sanches–Belo (TLS)	21–11	21–9	
13 Jun	Sannok–Tenpaksee (THA)	2–0	Sanches–Belo (TLS)	21–11	21–0	
14 Jun	Sannok–Tenpaksee (THA)	2–0	Chan–Tse (HKG)	21–10	21–13	

===== Group T =====
Pos	Team	Pld	W	L	Pts	SW	SL	SR	SPW	SPL	SPR
1	Radarong–Udomchavee (THA)	2	2	0	4	4	0	MAX	84	15	5.600
2	Khadka–Shah (NEP)	2	1	1	3	2	2	1.000	52	63	0.825
3	Abdullah–Al-Zaabi (IOA)	2	0	2	2	0	4	0.000	26	84	0.310

Source: AVC

Date		Score		Set 1	Set 2	Set 3
12 Jun	Khadka–Shah (NEP)	2–0	Abdullah–Al-Zaabi (IOA)	21–7	21–14	
13 Jun	Radarong–Udomchavee (THA)	2–0	Abdullah–Al-Zaabi (IOA)	21–1	21–4	
14 Jun	Radarong–Udomchavee (THA)	2–0	Khadka–Shah (NEP)	21–6	21–4	

===== Group U =====
Pos	Team	Pld	W	L	Pts	SW	SL	SR	SPW	SPL	SPR
1	Mashkova–Tsimbalova (KAZ)	2	2	0	4	4	1	4.000	97	73	1.329
2	Zhu–Ma (CHN)	2	1	1	3	2	2	1.000	75	61	1.230
3	Oyama–Ishida (JPN)	2	0	2	2	1	4	0.250	59	97	0.608

Source: AVC

Date		Score		Set 1	Set 2	Set 3
12 Jun	Zhu–Ma (CHN)	2–0	Oyama–Ishida (JPN)	21–11	21–8	
13 Jun	Mashkova–Tsimbalova (KAZ)	2–1	Oyama–Ishida (JPN)	19–21	21–14	15–5
14 Jun	Mashkova–Tsimbalova (KAZ)	2–0	Zhu–Ma (CHN)	21–16	21–17	

===== Group V =====
Pos	Team	Pld	W	L	Pts	SW	SL	SR	SPW	SPL	SPR
1	Hu–Chen (CHN)	2	2	0	4	4	0	MAX	84	32	2.625
2	Wong–Ng (HKG)	2	1	1	3	2	2	1.000	68	47	1.447
3	Husain–Al-Najadah (IOA)	2	0	2	2	0	4	0.000	11	84	0.131

Source: AVC

Date		Score		Set 1	Set 2	Set 3
12 Jun	Hu–Chen (CHN)	2–0	Husain–Al-Najadah (IOA)	21–3	21–3	
13 Jun	Wong–Ng (HKG)	2–0	Husain–Al-Najadah (IOA)	21–1	21–4	
14 Jun	Wong–Ng (HKG)	0–2	Hu–Chen (CHN)	19–21	7–21	

===== Group W =====
Pos	Team	Pld	W	L	Pts	SW	SL	SR	SPW	SPL	SPR
1	Siam–Juliana (INA)	2	2	0	4	4	1	4.000	95	60	1.583
2	Huỳnh–Phan (VIE)	2	1	1	3	3	2	1.500	86	66	1.303
3	Enkhjargal–Oyuuntuyaa (MGL)	2	0	2	2	0	4	0.000	29	84	0.345

Source: AVC

Date		Score		Set 1	Set 2	Set 3
12 Jun	Huỳnh–Phan (VIE)	2–0	Enkhjargal–Oyuuntuyaa (MGL)	21–10	21–3	
13 Jun	Siam–Juliana (INA)	2–0	Enkhjargal–Oyuuntuyaa (MGL)	21–11	21–5	
14 Jun	Siam–Juliana (INA)	2–1	Huỳnh–Phan (VIE)	21–16	17–21	15–7

===== Group X =====
Pos	Team	Pld	W	L	Pts	SW	SL	SR	SPW	SPL	SPR
1	Nguyễn–Phan (VIE)	2	2	0	4	4	0	MAX	84	53	1.585
2	Gunasinghe–Lakmini (SRI)	2	1	1	3	2	2	1.000	73	67	1.090
3	Erdenezayaa–Ölziidelger (MGL)	2	0	2	2	0	4	0.000	47	84	0.560

Source: AVC

Date		Score		Set 1	Set 2	Set 3
12 Jun	Gunasinghe–Lakmini (SRI)	2–0	Erdenezayaa–Ölziidelger (MGL)	21–18	21–7	
13 Jun	Nguyễn–Phan (VIE)	2–0	Erdenezayaa–Ölziidelger (MGL)	21–10	21–12	
14 Jun	Nguyễn–Phan (VIE)	2–0	Gunasinghe–Lakmini (SRI)	21–14	21–17	

===== Group Y =====
Pos	Team	Pld	W	L	Pts	SW	SL	SR	SPW	SPL	SPR
1	Wijayanti–Utami (INA)	2	2	0	4	4	0	MAX	84	57	1.474
2	Liu–Wu (TPE)	2	1	1	3	2	2	1.000	75	60	1.250
3	Khanina–Shchelokova (KGZ)	2	0	2	2	0	4	0.000	42	84	0.500

Source: AVC

Date		Score		Set 1	Set 2	Set 3
12 Jun	Liu–Wu (TPE)	2–0	Khanina–Shchelokova (KGZ)	21–10	21–8	
13 Jun	Wijayanti–Utami (INA)	2–0	Khanina–Shchelokova (KGZ)	21–9	21–15	
14 Jun	Wijayanti–Utami (INA)	2–0	Liu–Wu (TPE)	21–17	21–16	

===== Group Z =====
Pos	Team	Pld	W	L	Pts	SW	SL	SR	SPW	SPL	SPR
1	Kou–Chang (TPE)	3	3	0	6	6	1	6.000	136	90	1.511
2	Gunasinghe–Gunawardena (SRI)	3	2	1	5	4	2	2.000	107	78	1.372
3	Miyagawa–Nagata (JPN)	3	1	2	4	3	4	0.750	120	106	1.132
4	Popowa–Sklennaýa (TKM)	3	0	3	3	0	6	0.000	37	126	0.294

Source: AVC

Date		Score		Set 1	Set 2	Set 3
12 Jun	Gunasinghe–Gunawardena (SRI)	2–0	Popowa–Sklennaýa (TKM)	21–6	21–6	
12 Jun	Kou–Chang (TPE)	2–1	Miyagawa–Nagata (JPN)	15–21	21–19	16–14
13 Jun	Kou–Chang (TPE)	2–0	Popowa–Sklennaýa (TKM)	21–6	21–7	
13 Jun	Gunasinghe–Gunawardena (SRI)	2–0	Miyagawa–Nagata (JPN)	21–12	21–12	
14 Jun	Kou–Chang (TPE)	2–0	Gunasinghe–Gunawardena (SRI)	21–9	21–14	
14 Jun	Popowa–Sklennaýa (TKM)	0–2	Miyagawa–Nagata (JPN)	5–21	7–21	

==== Knockout round ====
Round of 16; 15 June
Sannok–Tenpaksee (THA)	21	17	11
Zhu–Ma (CHN)	16	21	15
Gunasinghe–Lakmini (SRI)	17	12
Kou–Chang (TPE)	21	21
Siam–Juliana (INA)	23	21
Liu–Wu (TPE)	21	12
Chan–Tse (HKG)	10	17
Hu–Chen (CHN)	21	21
Mashkova–Tsimbalova (KAZ)	21	21
Khadka–Shah (NEP)	9	4
Gunasinghe–Gunawardena (SRI)	20	17
Nguyễn–Phan (VIE)	22	21
Wijayanti–Utami (INA)	21	21
Huỳnh–Phan (VIE)	19	16
Wong–Ng (HKG)	12	16
Radarong–Udomchavee (THA)	21	21

Quarterfinals; 16 June
Zhu–Ma (CHN)	20	13
Kou–Chang (TPE)	22	21
Siam–Juliana (INA)	14	18
Hu–Chen (CHN)	21	21
Mashkova–Tsimbalova (KAZ)	21	21
Nguyễn–Phan (VIE)	14	18
Wijayanti–Utami (INA)	16	14
Radarong–Udomchavee (THA)	21	21

Semifinals; 17 June
Kou–Chang (TPE)	25	18	19
Hu–Chen (CHN)	23	21	21
Mashkova–Tsimbalova (KAZ)	22	17
Radarong–Udomchavee (THA)	24	21

Gold medal match 18 June
Hu–Chen (CHN)	23	16	14
Radarong–Udomchavee (THA)	21	21	16
Bronze medal match
Kou–Chang (TPE)	21	18	15
Mashkova–Tsimbalova (KAZ)	16	21	13
