= Sport climbing at the 2012 Asian Beach Games =

- Venue: Fengxiang Beach
- Dates: 17–20 June 2012

Sport climbing at the 2012 Asian Beach Games was held from 17 June to 20 June 2012 in Fengxiang Beach, Haiyang, China.

== Medalists ==
=== Men ===
Event	Gold	Silver	Bronze
Boulder	Atsushi Shimizu; Japan	Tsukuru Hori; Japan	Min Hyun-bin; South Korea
Lead	Min Hyun-bin; South Korea	Sachi Anma; Japan	Park Ji-hwan; South Korea
Speed	Zhong Qixin; China	Rindi Sufriyanto; Indonesia	Zhang Ning; China
Speed relay	Indonesia; Galar Pandu Asmoro; Tonny Mamiri; Rindi Sufriyanto	China; Li Guangdong; Zhang Ning; Zhong Qixin	South Korea; Cho Seung-woon; Kim Ja-bee; Sim Seol-been

=== Women ===
Event	Gold	Silver	Bronze
Boulder	Kim Ja-in; South Korea	Akiyo Noguchi; Japan	Sa Sol; South Korea
Lead	Kim Ja-in; South Korea	Han Seu-ran; South Korea	Yuka Kobayashi; Japan
Speed	Wang Yang; China	He Cuilian; China	Evi Neliwati; Indonesia
Speed relay	China; He Cuilian; Pan Xuhua; Wang Yang	Indonesia; Evi Neliwati; Ita Triana Purnamasari; Tita Supita	South Korea; Han Seu-ran; Kim Youn-a; Sa Sol

== Medal table ==
Rank	Nation	Gold	Silver	Bronze	Total
1	China (CHN)	3	2	1	6
2	South Korea (KOR)	3	1	5	9
3	Japan (JPN)	1	3	1	5
4	Indonesia (INA)	1	2	1	4
Totals (4 entries)		8	8	8	24

== Results ==
=== Men ===
==== Boulder ====
17–19 June

Rank	Athlete	Qual.	SF	Final
1st place, gold medalist(s)	Atsushi Shimizu (JPN)	5t6 5b6	4t7 4b7	4t4 4b4
2nd place, silver medalist(s)	Tsukuru Hori (JPN)	5t5 5b5	4t6 4b5	4t5 4b4
3rd place, bronze medalist(s)	Min Hyun-bin (KOR)	5t5 5b5	2t2 3b3	2t5 3b3
4	Ho Sin Fai (HKG)	4t4 4b4	2t2 4b5	2t6 4b7
5	Kim Ja-bee (KOR)	5t12 5b6	2t3 4b7	0t0 3b3
6	Wang Qinghua (CHN)	2t2 5b5	2t4 3b4	0t0 3b3
7	Tang Siu Hei (HKG)	3t4 4b5	1t1 4b8	
8	Yau Ka Chun (HKG)	3t6 5b9	1t1 4b10	
9	Aan Aviansyah (INA)	2t2 4b4	1t1 3b7	
10	Qu Haibin (CHN)	2t2 5b7	1t1 2b2	
11	Qiu Hongshu (CHN)	3t3 5b5	1t1 2b3	
12	Riki Kiswani (INA)	3t4 5b6	1t1 2b3	
13	Jonathan Feleo (PHI)	1t1 3b3	1t1 2b6	
14	Chang Yeu-shiang (TPE)	2t2 3b3	1t1 1b1	
15	Abudzar Yulianto (INA)	2t3 3b3	1t2 3b7	
16	Dennis Diaz (PHI)	0t0 4b5	0t0 3b8	
17	Winai Ruangrit (THA)	0t0 3b3	0t0 2b5	
18	Dmitriy Sorokin (UZB)	0t0 3b3	0t0 1b2	
19	Jason Sauco (PHI)	0t0 3b3	0t0 1b2	
20	Sim Seol-been (KOR)	2t3 3b3	DNS	
21	Udomsit Sukkho (THA)	0t0 3b5		
22	Bùi Văn Ngợi (VIE)	0t0 2b2		
23	Atth Tejakunbundit (THA)	0t0 1b1		
23	Ngô Đình Bảo (VIE)	0t0 1b1		
25	Phan Thanh Nhiên (VIE)	0t0 1b2		

==== Lead ====
18–20 June

Rank	Athlete	Qual.	SF	Final
1st place, gold medalist(s)	Min Hyun-bin (KOR)	Top	40+	44+
2nd place, silver medalist(s)	Sachi Anma (JPN)	Top	40+	33+
3rd place, bronze medalist(s)	Park Ji-hwan (KOR)	Top	38+	32+
4	Masahiro Higuchi (JPN)	Top	37+	24+
5	Ma Zida (CHN)	40	25+	23+
6	Wang Qinghua (CHN)	43	23+	23+
7	Cho Seung-woon (KOR)	43	23+	19+
8	Akbar Huda Wardana (INA)	29+	23+	18+
9	Suolang Jiacuo (CHN)	44	23	
10	Amri (INA)	31+	23	
11	Yau Ka Chun (HKG)	36+	22+	
12	Nurmansyah Putra (INA)	38+	21+	
13	Chang Yeu-shiang (TPE)	30+	21+	
14	Winai Ruangrit (THA)	27+	17+	
15	Jason Sauco (PHI)	17+	17+	
16	Dennis Diaz (PHI)	24+	15+	
17	Jonathan Feleo (PHI)	22	14	
18	Terdpol Artaui (THA)	21+	13	
19	Bùi Văn Ngợi (VIE)	14+	12	
20	Dmitriy Sorokin (UZB)	23	11+	
21	Niraj Karki (NEP)	20	11+	
22	Ngô Đình Bảo (VIE)	19+	11+	
23	Udomsit Sukkho (THA)	18	11+	
24	Phan Thanh Nhiên (VIE)	17	11+	
25	Hareram Khadka (NEP)	17	11	
26	Mingma Sherpa (NEP)	14+	11	

==== Speed ====
===== Qualification =====
17 June

Rank	Athlete	Time
1	Zhong Qixin (CHN)	6.56
2	Tonny Mamiri (INA)	7.07
3	Zhang Ning (CHN)	7.30
4	Rindi Sufriyanto (INA)	7.32
5	Galar Pandu Asmoro (INA)	8.01
6	Li Guangdong (CHN)	8.63
7	Chang Yeu-shiang (TPE)	9.44
8	Yau Ka Chun (HKG)	12.90
9	Cho Seung-woon (KOR)	15.60
10	Park Ji-hwan (KOR)	15.68
11	Phan Thanh Nhiên (VIE)	16.39
12	Bùi Văn Ngợi (VIE)	16.83
13	Nguyễn Mậu Linh (VIE)	25.62
—	Sim Seol-been (KOR)	DNS

===== Knockout round =====
18 June

Quarterfinals
Zhong Qixin (CHN)	7.78
Yau Ka Chun (HKG)	12.90
Galar Pandu Asmoro (INA)	7.04
Tonny Mamiri (INA)	7.07
Zhang Ning (CHN)	8.40
Chang Yeu-shiang (TPE)	9.44
Rindi Sufriyanto (INA)	7.34
Li Guangdong (CHN)	8.63

Semifinals
Zhong Qixin (CHN)	6.36
Galar Pandu Asmoro (INA)	7.05
Zhang Ning (CHN)	7.55
Rindi Sufriyanto (INA)	7.45

Gold medal final
Zhong Qixin (CHN)	6.56
Rindi Sufriyanto (INA)	7.32
Bronze medal final
Galar Pandu Asmoro (INA)	8.01
Zhang Ning (CHN)	7.30

==== Speed relay ====
===== Qualification =====
17 June

Rank	Team	Time
1	China (CHN)	23.30
2	Indonesia (INA)	23.31
3	South Korea (KOR)	44.39
4	Vietnam (VIE)	58.23

===== Knockout round =====
18 June

Bronze medal final
South Korea	46.61
Vietnam	64.89

Gold medal final
China	Fall
Indonesia	21.58

=== Women ===
==== Boulder ====
17–19 June

Rank	Athlete	Qual.	SF	Final
1st place, gold medalist(s)	Kim Ja-in (KOR)	5t5 5b5	3t9 4b10	4t4 4b4
2nd place, silver medalist(s)	Akiyo Noguchi (JPN)	5t5 5b5	4t5 4b5	2t2 4b6
3rd place, bronze medalist(s)	Sa Sol (KOR)	5t5 5b5	2t2 4b10	1t1 4b6
4	Lee Hung-ying (TPE)	5t6 5b5	2t2 4b4	1t1 3b3
5	Atori Yasuda (JPN)	5t5 5b5	2t2 4b8	1t1 2b3
6	Jiang Rong (CHN)	3t6 5b6	2t2 3b12	1t2 2b4
7	Renqing Lamu (CHN)	5t10 5b7	2t2 2b2	
8	Pan Xuhua (CHN)	4t5 5b5	2t3 3b8	
9	Nadya Putri Virgita (INA)	2t2 5b5	2t3 2b3	
10	Fitria Hartani (INA)	5t5 5b5	2t4 2b2	
11	Anitama Purnawati (INA)	3t5 5b5	1t1 2b2	
12	Kim Youn-a (KOR)	1t1 5b7	1t3 1b2	
13	Puntarika Tunyavanich (THA)	2t5 5b8	0t0 2b2	
14	Pratthana Raksachat (THA)	1t1 4b4	0t0 2b4	
15	Watchareewan Tomas (THA)	1t3 4b5	0t0 2b13	
16	Wu Wing Yu (HKG)	1t1 4b5	0t0 0b0	
17	Milky Mae Tejares (PHI)	1t2 4b5	0t0 0b0	
18	Liu Hiu Ying (HKG)	1t2 4b6	DNS	

==== Lead ====
18–20 June

Rank	Athlete	Qual.	SF	Final
1st place, gold medalist(s)	Kim Ja-in (KOR)	Top	Top	Top
2nd place, silver medalist(s)	Han Seu-ran (KOR)	Top	36+	50
3rd place, bronze medalist(s)	Yuka Kobayashi (JPN)	Top	27+	38
4	Renqing Lamu (CHN)	36+	27+	34.5+
5	Pan Xuhua (CHN)	36	29+	34
6	Harini (INA)	35+	26	34
7	Ilmawaty Labanu (INA)	35+	26	28+
8	Sa Sol (KOR)	37	26+	23+
9	Liu Hiu Ying (HKG)	35	26+	20+
10	Lee Hung-ying (TPE)	34+	26	
11	Wilda Baco Achmad (INA)	32+	25.5+	
12	Puntarika Tunyavanich (THA)	28+	25.5+	
13	Pratthana Raksachat (THA)	24	25+	
14	Pankaew Plypoolsup (THA)	21	18	
15	Wu Wing Yu (HKG)	21	17+	
16	Milky Mae Tejares (PHI)	23	17	
17	Jiang Rong (CHN)	28+	DNS	

==== Speed ====
===== Qualification =====
17 June

Rank	Athlete	Time
1	He Cuilian (CHN)	9.70
2	Wang Yang (CHN)	9.92
3	Tita Supita (INA)	10.26
4	Evi Neliwati (INA)	11.12
5	Ita Triana Purnamasari (INA)	11.16
6	Lee Hung-ying (TPE)	11.34
7	Pan Xuhua (CHN)	11.91
8	Sa Sol (KOR)	16.17
9	Kim Ja-in (KOR)	18.33
10	Kim Youn-a (KOR)	32.11
—	Wu Wing Yu (HKG)	DNS

===== Knockout round =====
18 June

Quarterfinals
He Cuilian (CHN)	10.55
Sa Sol (KOR)	DNS
Evi Neliwati (INA)	9.98
Ita Triana Purnamasari (INA)	10.30
Wang Yang (CHN)	9.83
Pan Xuhua (CHN)	11.38
Tita Supita (INA)	10.17
Lee Hung-ying (TPE)	Fall

Semifinals
He Cuilian (CHN)	9.53
Evi Neliwati (INA)	11.20
Wang Yang (CHN)	9.53
Tita Supita (INA)	10.60

Gold medal final
He Cuilian (CHN)	10.31
Wang Yang (CHN)	9.60
Bronze medal final
Evi Neliwati (INA)	10.10
Tita Supita (INA)	10.60

==== Speed relay ====
===== Qualification =====
17 June

Rank	Team	Time
1	China (CHN)	33.78
2	Indonesia (INA)	34.62
3	South Korea (KOR)	79.05

===== Knockout round =====
18 June

Gold medal final
China	32.15
Indonesia	Fall
