= Water skiing at the 2012 Asian Beach Games =

- Venue: Zhaohu Mountain
- Dates: 20–22 June 2012

Water skiing at the 2012 Asian Beach Games was held from 20 June to 22 June 2012 in Haiyang, China.

== Medalists ==
Event	Gold	Silver	Bronze
Men's tricks	Shi Longfei; China	Maliki Zulkarnain; Indonesia	Jeong Ji-min; South Korea
Men's wakeboard	Tatsanai Kuakoonrat; Thailand	Ji Hoon; South Korea	Jung In-sang; South Korea
Women's tricks	Song Yufei; China	Jiang Hui; China	Hiroko Komori; Japan
Women's wakeboard	Han Qiu; China	Chen Lili; China	Sasha Christian; Singapore

== Medal table ==
Rank	Nation	Gold	Silver	Bronze	Total
1	China (CHN)	3	2	0	5
2	Thailand (THA)	1	0	0	1
3	South Korea (KOR)	0	1	2	3
4	Indonesia (INA)	0	1	0	1
5	Japan (JPN)	0	0	1	1
5	Singapore (SIN)	0	0	1	1
Totals (6 entries)		4	4	4	12

== Results ==
=== Men's tricks ===
21–22 June

Rank	Athlete	Prel.	Final
1st place, gold medalist(s)	Shi Longfei (CHN)	4200	4410
2nd place, silver medalist(s)	Maliki Zulkarnain (INA)	3040	3540
3rd place, bronze medalist(s)	Jeong Ji-min (KOR)	2260	3180
4	Cho Beom-geun (KOR)	3260	3170
5	Febrianto Kadir (INA)	3050	2860
6	Andri Muhamad Febiandi (INA)	2850	2640
7	Kim Dong-eon (KOR)	2720	2490
8	Alex Yoong (MAS)	2800	2100
9	Padiwat Jaemjan (THA)	1380	1960
10	Bader Al-Jihayem (IOA)	1810	810
11	Ren Hongliang (CHN)	1000	
12	Zaim Shamsul Anuar (MAS)	570	
13	Zahhar Shamsul Anuar (MAS)	500	
14	Nattawut Hapholdee (THA)	290	

=== Men's wakeboard ===
==== Quarterfinals ====
20 June

Rank	Athlete	Score
Heat 1
1	Cheung Ho Lung (HKG)	53.47
2	Nur Akbar Imansyah (INA)	38.24
3	Zhang Wei (CHN)	35.70
4	Khaled Al-Sheraian (IOA)	32.78
Heat 2
1	Bunyalo Jumruang (THA)	62.35
2	Tatsanai Kuakoonrat (THA)	58.46
3	Surdinsya (INA)	27.45
4	Zahhar Shamsul Anuar (MAS)	5.02
Heat 3
1	Ji Hoon (KOR)	67.23
2	Lin Xiaojun (CHN)	55.46
3	Wan Ka Choi (HKG)	55.34
4	Wang Wenjun (CHN)	21.80
Heat 4
1	Padiwat Jaemjan (THA)	68.68
2	Julien Breistroff (HKG)	54.91
3	Bader Al-Jihayem (IOA)	47.91
4	Zaim Shamsul Anuar (MAS)	18.89
Heat 5
1	Kim Byoung-rang (KOR)	59.01
2	Jung In-sang (KOR)	50.90
3	Alek Hanif (INA)	36.46
4	Kan Chun-yu (TPE)	36.35
5	Alex Yoong (MAS)	13.37

==== Last chance qualifiers ====
21 June

Rank	Athlete	Score
Heat 1
1	Wan Ka Choi (HKG)	51.34
2	Alek Hanif (INA)	45.46
3	Kan Chun-yu (TPE)	32.03
4	Khaled Al-Sheraian (IOA)	27.24
5	Zahhar Shamsul Anuar (MAS)	11.47
—	Alex Yoong (MAS)	DNS
Heat 2
1	Bader Al-Jihayem (IOA)	54.24
2	Zhang Wei (CHN)	46.34
3	Wang Wenjun (CHN)	26.57
4	Surdinsya (INA)	19.91
5	Zaim Shamsul Anuar (MAS)	13.46

==== Semifinals ====
21 June

Rank	Athlete	Score
Heat 1
1	Lin Xiaojun (CHN)	58.90
2	Bunyalo Jumruang (THA)	57.01
3	Cheung Ho Lung (HKG)	49.45
4	Nur Akbar Imansyah (INA)	39.79
Heat 2
1	Julien Breistroff (HKG)	59.24
2	Ji Hoon (KOR)	55.46
3	Kim Byoung-rang (KOR)	52.14
4	Wan Ka Choi (HKG)	38.68
Heat 3
1	Tatsanai Kuakoonrat (THA)	61.68
2	Jung In-sang (KOR)	61.12
3	Padiwat Jaemjan (THA)	58.12
4	Bader Al-Jihayem (IOA)	43.12

==== Final ====
22 June

Rank	Athlete	Score
1st place, gold medalist(s)	Tatsanai Kuakoonrat (THA)	79.23
2nd place, silver medalist(s)	Ji Hoon (KOR)	73.80
3rd place, bronze medalist(s)	Jung In-sang (KOR)	70.02
4	Bunyalo Jumruang (THA)	66.23
5	Julien Breistroff (HKG)	55.25
6	Lin Xiaojun (CHN)	53.46

=== Women's tricks ===
21–22 June

Rank	Athlete	Prel.	Final
1st place, gold medalist(s)	Song Yufei (CHN)	5880	5380
2nd place, silver medalist(s)	Jiang Hui (CHN)	4880	4500
3rd place, bronze medalist(s)	Hiroko Komori (JPN)	3440	3280
4	Sareeya Promsuntisit (THA)	2930	3280
5	Nur Tsuraya Priambodo (INA)	2160	3240
6	Saaya Hirosawa (JPN)	2540	3020
7	Aaliyah Yoong (MAS)	2600	2950
8	Jang Da-hyeong (KOR)	1130	1480
9	Han Ah-reum (KOR)	1390	1290
10	Seo Na-na (KOR)	580	580
11	Pattanan Pamonpol (THA)	560	
12	Jeanne Al-Failakawi (IOA)	360	
13	Nur Qamarina Shamsul Anuar (MAS)	290	

=== Women's wakeboard ===
==== Quarterfinals ====
20 June

Rank	Athlete	Score
Heat 1
1	Miku Asai (JPN)	49.80
2	Teng Pei-shan (TPE)	15.81
3	Mai Al-Failakawi (IOA)	14.34
—	Aaliyah Yoong (MAS)	DNS
Heat 2
1	Duan Zhenkun (CHN)	48.45
2	Han Qiu (CHN)	43.38
3	Srirasin Khamklom (THA)	27.33
4	Jeanne Al-Failakawi (IOA)	26.13
Heat 3
1	Chen Lili (CHN)	49.01
2	Joo Seul-kee (KOR)	33.25
3	Apassorn Akaraisayaporn (THA)	24.91
4	Nur Qamarina Shamsul Anuar (MAS)	10.68
Heat 4
1	Sasha Christian (SIN)	47.23
2	Yun Hee-hyun (KOR)	34.24
3	Lee Sun-joo (KOR)	29.23
4	Tantanasorn Chaiyabood (THA)	11.01

==== Last chance qualifiers ====
21 June

Rank	Athlete	Score
Heat 1
1	Apassorn Akaraisayaporn (THA)	18.58
2	Tantanasorn Chaiyabood (THA)	14.89
3	Nur Qamarina Shamsul Anuar (MAS)	10.35
4	Mai Al-Failakawi (IOA)	8.45
Heat 2
1	Lee Sun-joo (KOR)	27.23
2	Srirasin Khamklom (THA)	22.47
3	Jeanne Al-Failakawi (IOA)	19.68

==== Semifinals ====
21 June

Rank	Athlete	Score
Heat 1
1	Miku Asai (JPN)	57.57
2	Duan Zhenkun (CHN)	48.34
3	Lee Sun-joo (KOR)	33.24
4	Apassorn Akaraisayaporn (THA)	23.34
Heat 2
1	Han Qiu (CHN)	54.23
2	Chen Lili (CHN)	43.03
3	Yun Hee-hyun (KOR)	36.63
4	Srirasin Khamklom (THA)	18.89
Heat 3
1	Sasha Christian (SIN)	51.23
2	Joo Seul-kee (KOR)	35.02
3	Teng Pei-shan (TPE)	24.12
4	Tantanasorn Chaiyabood (THA)	14.91

==== Final ====
22 June

Rank	Athlete	Score
1st place, gold medalist(s)	Han Qiu (CHN)	67.89
2nd place, silver medalist(s)	Chen Lili (CHN)	57.78
3rd place, bronze medalist(s)	Sasha Christian (SIN)	53.67
4	Miku Asai (JPN)	49.58
5	Duan Zhenkun (CHN)	49.13
6	Joo Seul-kee (KOR)	40.56
