= Beach woodball at the 2012 Asian Beach Games =

- Venue: Fengxiang Beach
- Dates: 18–21 June 2012

Beach woodball at the 2012 Asian Beach Games was held from 18 June to 21 June 2012 in Haiyang, China.

== Medalists ==
| Event | Gold | Silver | Bronze |
|---|---|---|---|
| Men's singles | Chinnakrit Imkrajang; Thailand | Klayut Mongkholsamai; Thailand | Lin Yu-hsien; Chinese Taipei |
| Men's team | Thailand; Peera Chaisongkram; Chinnakrit Imkrajang; Jukkarin Khunthong; Klayut Mongkholsamai; Wattana Phromkaew; Kittiphan Pongsane | Chinese Taipei; Huang Ming-ting; Hung Chia-tse; Lin Yu-hsien; Lin Ta-hsiang; Lo Chieh; Wu Yi-cheng | China; Lei Dong; Liang Bin; Ma Jian; Wang Tuo; Ye Qiwei; Zhu Zuoqing |
| Women's singles | Praewpan Chaithong; Thailand | Siripat Karinit; Thailand | Wu Chih-han; Chinese Taipei |
| Women's team | Thailand; Altira Boonjit; Pornpimon Buaklang; Praewpan Chaithong; Siripat Karinit; Chonnipa Pengwichai; Jenjira Rachaseemuang | Chinese Taipei; Chen Yu-hsuan; Chiang Fang-yu; Chung Pi-ju; Lu Meng-han; Pan Hsin-yi; Wu Chih-han | China; Li Ming; Liu Zhihui; Wang Dan; Wang Jing; Xu Wangqian; Yang Pei |

== Medal table ==
| Rank | Nation | Gold | Silver | Bronze | Total |
|---|---|---|---|---|---|
| 1 | Thailand (THA) | 4 | 2 | 0 | 6 |
| 2 | Chinese Taipei (TPE) | 0 | 2 | 2 | 4 |
| 3 | China (CHN) | 0 | 0 | 2 | 2 |
| Totals (3 entries) | | 4 | 4 | 4 | 12 |

== Results ==
=== Men's singles ===
18–21 June

| Rank | Athlete | Prel. | Final |
|---|---|---|---|
| 1st place, gold medalist(s) | Chinnakrit Imkrajang (THA) | 158 | 193 |
| 2nd place, silver medalist(s) | Klayut Mongkholsamai (THA) | 160 | 197 |
| 3 | Peera Chaisongkram (THA) | 160 | 202 |
| 4 | Kittiphan Pongsane (THA) | 162 | 203 |
| 5 | Jukkarin Khunthong (THA) | 166 | 205 |
| 3rd place, bronze medalist(s) | Lin Yu-hsien (TPE) | 167 | 209 |
| 7 | Ye Qiwei (CHN) | 167 | 211 |
| 8 | Kiadtisak Saengrit (THA) | 170 | 215 |
| 9 | Wattana Phromkaew (THA) | 172 | 215 |
| 10 | Lei Dong (CHN) | 172 | |
| 11 | Huang Ming-ting (TPE) | 174 | |
| 12 | Wu Yi-cheng (TPE) | 174 | |
| 13 | Naluenat Puangmaduea (THA) | 175 | |
| 14 | Liang Bin (CHN) | 176 | |
| 15 | Chen Chih-fu (TPE) | 177 | |
| 16 | Hung Chia-tse (TPE) | 178 | |
| 17 | Wong Siu Kai (HKG) | 179 | |
| 18 | Wang Tuo (CHN) | 181 | |
| 19 | Phạm Công Thành (VIE) | 182 | |
| 20 | Zhu Zuoqing (CHN) | 182 | |
| 21 | Lo Chieh (TPE) | 183 | |
| 22 | Siow Chong Wah (MAS) | 184 | |
| 23 | Đoàn Văn Mai (VIE) | 187 | |
| 24 | Ma Jian (CHN) | 188 | |
| 25 | Jeremy Ngai (HKG) | 189 | |
| 26 | Bharat Gurav (IND) | 191 | |
| 27 | Lee Pei-jung (TPE) | 192 | |
| 28 | Cao Hoàng Anh (VIE) | 192 | |
| 29 | Trần Anh Đức (VIE) | 194 | |
| 30 | Lam Chi Ho (HKG) | 196 | |
| 31 | Vũ Hồng Quân (VIE) | 197 | |
| 32 | Lin Ta-hsiang (TPE) | 198 | |
| 33 | Lee Hon Kwong (HKG) | 199 | |
| 34 | Li Chi Tak (HKG) | 199 | |
| 35 | Xu Qiang (CHN) | 200 | |
| 36 | Yeo Kim Mon (MAS) | 201 | |
| 37 | Liang Yunhai (CHN) | 203 | |
| 38 | Subhash Chander Gupta (IND) | 207 | |
| 39 | Bandiin Mönkhbat (MGL) | 210 | |
| 40 | Woo Chee Kam (MAS) | 212 | |
| 41 | Chow Wai Kin (HKG) | 215 | |
| 42 | Trần Duy Anh (VIE) | 224 | |
| 43 | Ganboldyn Sugarbayar (MGL) | 225 | |
| 44 | Santosh Gurav (IND) | 235 | |
| 45 | Kapil Kumar Sahu (IND) | 236 | |
| 46 | Ganboldyn Batmyagmar (MGL) | 237 | |
| 47 | Kwet Seng Moun (MAS) | 246 | |
| 48 | Heng Kuang Hak (MAS) | 251 | |
| 49 | Tushar Mahadu Jadhav (IND) | 257 | |
| 50 | Anurag Choudhary (IND) | 259 | |
| 51 | Sükhbayaryn Battsooj (MGL) | 279 | |
| 52 | Anil Kumar (IND) | 284 | |
| 53 | Mayank Arora (IND) | 315 | |

- Lin Yu-hsien was awarded bronze because of no three-medal sweep per country rule.

=== Men's team ===
18–20 June

| Rank | Team | Score |
|---|---|---|
| 1st place, gold medalist(s) | Thailand (THA) | 614 |
| 2nd place, silver medalist(s) | Chinese Taipei (TPE) | 674 |
| 3rd place, bronze medalist(s) | China (CHN) | 678 |
| 4 | Hong Kong (HKG) | 739 |
| 5 | Vietnam (VIE) | 740 |
| 6 | Malaysia (MAS) | 823 |
| 7 | India (IND) | 887 |
| 8 | Mongolia (MGL) | 951 |

=== Women's singles ===
18–21 June

| Rank | Athlete | Prel. | Final |
|---|---|---|---|
| 1st place, gold medalist(s) | Praewpan Chaithong (THA) | 176 | 217 |
| 2nd place, silver medalist(s) | Siripat Karinit (THA) | 177 | 220 |
| 3 | Jiraporn Chinpukdee (THA) | 176 | 222 |
| 3rd place, bronze medalist(s) | Wu Chih-han (TPE) | 181 | 224 |
| 5 | Altira Boonjit (THA) | 186 | 227 |
| 6 | Chonnipa Pengwichai (THA) | 184 | 229 |
| 7 | Liu Zhihui (CHN) | 185 | 230 |
| 8 | Chiang Fang-yu (TPE) | 181 | 231 |
| 9 | Gu Yuexia (CHN) | 185 | 234 |
| 10 | Pan Hsin-yi (TPE) | 187 | |
| 11 | Jenjira Rachaseemuang (THA) | 189 | |
| 12 | Wang Jing (CHN) | 190 | |
| 13 | Li Ming (CHN) | 190 | |
| 14 | Sayumphon Pimsawat (THA) | 190 | |
| 15 | Chung Pi-ju (TPE) | 193 | |
| 16 | Pornpimon Buaklang (THA) | 196 | |
| 17 | Huang Tzu-chi (TPE) | 198 | |
| 17 | Wang Dan (CHN) | 201 | |
| 19 | Yang Pei (CHN) | 202 | |
| 20 | Jiang Shilei (CHN) | 203 | |
| 21 | Chen Yu-hsuan (TPE) | 204 | |
| 22 | Lu Meng-han (TPE) | 204 | |
| 23 | Ng Cho Kwan (HKG) | 206 | |
| 24 | Nguyễn Thị Trà Mi (VIE) | 206 | |
| 25 | Trương Thị Hồng Quyên (VIE) | 208 | |
| 26 | Nguyễn Huyền Trang (VIE) | 209 | |
| 27 | Chui Ya-ting (TPE) | 212 | |
| 28 | Xu Wangqian (CHN) | 213 | |
| 29 | Phan Thị Phượng (VIE) | 214 | |
| 30 | Lien Yen Wa (MAS) | 221 | |
| 31 | Trần Thị Tuyết (VIE) | 221 | |
| 32 | Lim Kim Chew (MAS) | 244 | |
| 33 | Yap Bee Guan (MAS) | 250 | |
| 34 | Kong Ah Long (MAS) | 251 | |
| 35 | Lim Siew Loon (MAS) | 252 | |
| 36 | Chan Moi Nan (MAS) | 258 | |
| 37 | Natsagdorjiin Myagmarsüren (MGL) | 295 | |
| 38 | Rinku Kumari (IND) | 296 | |
| 39 | Sayali Shirke (IND) | 298 | |
| 40 | Gombojavyn Tungalag (MGL) | 303 | |
| 41 | Priya Santosh Gurav (IND) | 307 | |
| 42 | Rutuja Manwatkar (IND) | 375 | |
| 43 | Anagha Bansod (IND) | 398 | |
| 44 | Ayushree Deshmukh (IND) | 7992 | |

- Wu Chih-han was awarded bronze because of no three-medal sweep per country rule.

=== Women's team ===
18–20 June

| Rank | Team | Score |
|---|---|---|
| 1st place, gold medalist(s) | Thailand (THA) | 700 |
| 2nd place, silver medalist(s) | Chinese Taipei (TPE) | 729 |
| 3rd place, bronze medalist(s) | China (CHN) | 738 |
| 4 | Vietnam (VIE) | 826 |
| 5 | Malaysia (MAS) | 932 |
| 6 | India (IND) | 1266 |
