= Iran at the 2012 Asian Beach Games =

- IOC code: IRI
- NOC: National Olympic Committee of the Islamic Republic of Iran

in Haiyang
- Competitors: 23 in 4 sports
- Medals Ranked 7th: Gold 2 Silver 0 Bronze 0 Total 2

Asian Beach Games appearances
- 2008; 2010; 2012; 2014; 2016; 2026

Iran participated in the 2012 Asian Beach Games in Haiyang, China on 16–22 July 2012.

== Competitors ==
Sport	Men	Women	Total
Beach kabaddi	5		5
Beach soccer	10		10
Beach volleyball	4		4
Roller speed skating	4		4
Total	23	0	23

== Medal summary ==
=== Medals by sport ===
Sport	Gold	Silver	Bronze	Total
Beach kabaddi	1			1
Beach soccer	1			1
Total	2	0	0	2

=== Medalists ===
Medal	Name	Sport	Event
Gold	Mohammad Maghsoudloo; Meraj Sheikh; Kianoush Naderian; Gholam Abbas Korouki; Farhad Rahimi	Beach kabaddi	Men
Gold	Hamed Ghorbanpour; Hassan Abdollahi; Mehdi Hassani; Ali Naderi; Mehran Morshedizadeh; Farid Boloukbashi; Mohammad Ali Mokhtari; Moslem Mesigar; Mohammad Ahmadzadeh; Peyman Hosseini	Beach soccer	Men

== Results by event ==
=== Beach kabaddi ===
Team	Event	Preliminary round			Semifinal	Final	Rank
Team	Event	Round 1	Round 2	Rank	Semifinal	Final	Rank
Iran	Men	South Korea; W 48–27	India; W 42–32	1 Q	Sri Lanka; W 50–23	Pakistan; W 39–33	1st place, gold medalist(s)
Roster: Mohammad Maghsoudloo; Meraj Sheikh; Kianoush Naderian; Gholam Abbas Korouki; Farhad Rahimi; Coach: Abdolhamid Maghsoudloo

=== Beach soccer ===
Team	Event	Preliminary round				Quarterfinal	Semifinal	Final	Rank
Team	Event	Round 1	Round 2	Round 3	Rank	Quarterfinal	Semifinal	Final	Rank
Iran	Men	Qatar; W 10–2	Thailand; W 5–1	Japan; W 3–2	1 Q	United Arab Emirates; W 4–3	Palestine; W 9–1	China; W 2–0	1st place, gold medalist(s)
Roster: Hamed Ghorbanpour; Hassan Abdollahi; Mehdi Hassani; Ali Naderi; Mehran Morshedizadeh; Farid Boloukbashi; Mohammad Ali Mokhtari; Moslem Mesigar; Mohammad Ahmadzadeh; Peyman Hosseini; Coach: (Brazil) Marco Octávio

=== Beach volleyball ===
Athlete	Event	Preliminary round			Round of 16	Quarterfinal	Semifinal	Final	Rank
Athlete	Event	Round 1	Round 2	Rank	Round of 16	Quarterfinal	Semifinal	Final	Rank
Parviz Farrokhi; Aghmohammad Salagh	Men	Azizi and Sedeqi (AFG); W 2–0 (21–1, 21–6)	Naranbayar and Myagmarsüren (MGL); W 2–0 (21–8, 21–7)	1 Q	Li and Wu (CHN); W 2–1 (21–11, 18–21, 15–12)	Santosa and Fahriansyah (INA); L 1–2 (21–11, 18–21, 13–15)	Did not advance		5
Bahman Gholipouri; Saber Houshmand	Men	Al-Asaaf and Amir (IOA); W 2–0 (21–8, 21–8)	Kwok and Wong (HKG); W 2–0 (21–18, 21–17)	1 Q	Yakovlev and Kuleshov (KAZ); L 0–2 (13–21, 8–21)	Did not advance			9

=== Roller speed skating ===
Athlete	Event	Qualification / Heat		Semifinal		Final	Rank
Athlete	Event	Time	Rank	Time	Rank	Time / Score	Rank
Hossein Manshidi	Men's 200 m time trial	18.122	9 Q	—N/a		17.867	8
Mehrdad Sabetnia	Men's 200 m time trial	18.675	12 Q	—N/a		18.623	12
Mohammad Arezoumand	Men's 500 m sprint	41.918	4	Did not advance			13
Hossein Manshidi	Men's 500 m sprint	41.169	1 Q	40.563	3	Did not advance	7
Mohammad Arezoumand	Men's 10000 m points	—N/a				Eliminated	21
Pouria Ghasempour	Men's 10000 m points	—N/a				Eliminated	10
Pouria Ghasempour	Men's 20000 m elimination	—N/a				Eliminated	—
Mehrdad Sabetnia	Men's 20000 m elimination	—N/a				Eliminated	—
