= Paramotoring at the 2012 Asian Beach Games =

- Venue: Fengxiang Beach
- Dates: 17–21 June 2012

Paramotoring at the 2012 Asian Beach Games was held from 17 June to 21 June 2012 in Fengxiang Beach, Haiyang, China.

== Medalists ==
Event	Gold	Silver	Bronze
Individual economy	Sheng Guangqiang; China	Jiri George Macak; Thailand	Kittiphop Phrommat; Thailand
Individual precision	Jiri George Macak; Thailand	Kittiphop Phrommat; Thailand	Sheng Guangqiang; China
Individual combined	Jiri George Macak; Thailand	Kittiphop Phrommat; Thailand	Sheng Guangqiang; China
Team combined	Thailand; Noparat Intharaumnuay; Jiri George Macak; Kroekrit Muenphukhiao; Apisit Opasaimlikit; Kittiphop Phrommat	China; Cai He; Liu Chang; Sheng Guangqiang; Wang Mingji; Zhao Changhong	Indonesia; Priya Jatmiko Agung; Mukhammad Akbar; Hening Paradigma; Bambang Santoso; Thomas Widyananto

== Medal table ==
Rank	Nation	Gold	Silver	Bronze	Total
1	Thailand (THA)	3	3	1	7
2	China (CHN)	1	1	2	4
3	Indonesia (INA)	0	0	1	1
Totals (3 entries)		4	4	4	12

== Results ==
=== Individual economy ===
18–20 June

Rank	Athlete	Score
1st place, gold medalist(s)	Sheng Guangqiang (CHN)	85
2nd place, silver medalist(s)	Jiri George Macak (THA)	80
3rd place, bronze medalist(s)	Kittiphop Phrommat (THA)	64
4	Han Ki-soo (KOR)	58
5	Abdulbari Al-Abdullah (KSA)	52
6	Mukhammad Akbar (INA)	50
7	Na Ki-il (KOR)	47
8	Cai He (CHN)	42
8	Thomas Widyananto (INA)	42
10	Mohd Farid Abd Rahman (MAS)	41
11	Hening Paradigma (INA)	40
12	Bambang Santoso (INA)	37
13	Priya Jatmiko Agung (INA)	34
14	Liu Chang (CHN)	32
14	Wang Mingji (CHN)	32
16	Kim Ho-sung (KOR)	24
17	Kroekrit Muenphukhiao (THA)	23
18	An Sueng-yong (KOR)	18
19	Jung Dong-oh (KOR)	17
20	Zhao Changhong (CHN)	15
20	Noparat Intharaumnuay (THA)	15
22	Fahad Al-Zakri (KSA)	13
22	Hussain Al-Hendi (KSA)	13
24	Mohd Shahfaizal Saad (MAS)	8
25	Mohammed Al-Garni (KSA)	6
25	Jamal Al-Mannai (QAT)	6
25	Mohd Hurairah Alinur (MAS)	6
25	Zain Azrull Zabidin (MAS)	6
25	Apisit Opasaimlikit (THA)	6
30	Navid Popal (AFG)	0
30	Abdullah Al-Assaf (KSA)	0

=== Individual precision ===
17–21 June

Rank	Athlete	Score
1st place, gold medalist(s)	Jiri George Macak (THA)	215
2nd place, silver medalist(s)	Kittiphop Phrommat (THA)	206
3	Kroekrit Muenphukhiao (THA)	169
3rd place, bronze medalist(s)	Sheng Guangqiang (CHN)	154
5	Apisit Opasaimlikit (THA)	146
6	Liu Chang (CHN)	143
7	Wang Mingji (CHN)	140
8	Noparat Intharaumnuay (THA)	139
8	Cai He (CHN)	139
10	Zhao Changhong (CHN)	136
11	Han Ki-soo (KOR)	131
12	Mohd Hurairah Alinur (MAS)	126
13	Mukhammad Akbar (INA)	125
14	Bambang Santoso (INA)	104
15	Na Ki-il (KOR)	97
15	Kim Ho-sung (KOR)	97
17	Thomas Widyananto (INA)	93
18	An Sueng-yong (KOR)	92
19	Mohd Shahfaizal Saad (MAS)	89
20	Jamal Al-Mannai (QAT)	86
21	Fahad Al-Zakri (KSA)	84
22	Priya Jatmiko Agung (INA)	83
23	Jung Dong-oh (KOR)	82
24	Hening Paradigma (INA)	73
25	Abdulbari Al-Abdullah (KSA)	71
26	Hussain Al-Hendi (KSA)	66
27	Mohd Farid Abd Rahman (MAS)	65
28	Mohammed Al-Garni (KSA)	64
29	Zain Azrull Zabidin (MAS)	59
30	Abdullah Al-Assaf (KSA)	34
31	Navid Popal (AFG)	0

- Sheng Guangqiang was awarded bronze because of no three-medal sweep per country rule.

=== Individual combined ===
17–21 June

Rank	Athlete	Score
1st place, gold medalist(s)	Jiri George Macak (THA)	295
2nd place, silver medalist(s)	Kittiphop Phrommat (THA)	270
3rd place, bronze medalist(s)	Sheng Guangqiang (CHN)	239
4	Kroekrit Muenphukhiao (THA)	192
5	Han Ki-soo (KOR)	189
6	Cai He (CHN)	181
7	Mukhammad Akbar (INA)	175
7	Liu Chang (CHN)	175
9	Wang Mingji (CHN)	172
10	Noparat Intharaumnuay (THA)	154
11	Apisit Opasaimlikit (THA)	152
12	Zhao Changhong (CHN)	151
13	Na Ki-il (KOR)	144
14	Bambang Santoso (INA)	141
15	Thomas Widyananto (INA)	135
16	Mohd Hurairah Alinur (MAS)	132
17	Abdulbari Al-Abdullah (KSA)	123
18	Kim Ho-sung (KOR)	121
19	Priya Jatmiko Agung (INA)	117
20	Hening Paradigma (INA)	113
21	An Sueng-yong (KOR)	110
22	Mohd Farid Abd Rahman (MAS)	106
23	Jung Dong-oh (KOR)	99
24	Mohd Shahfaizal Saad (MAS)	97
24	Fahad Al-Zakri (KSA)	97
26	Jamal Al-Mannai (QAT)	92
27	Hussain Al-Hendi (KSA)	79
28	Mohammed Al-Garni (KSA)	70
29	Zain Azrull Zabidin (MAS)	65
30	Abdullah Al-Assaf (KSA)	34
31	Navid Popal (AFG)	0

=== Team combined ===
17–21 June

Rank	Team	Score
1st place, gold medalist(s)	Thailand (THA)	802
2nd place, silver medalist(s)	China (CHN)	641
3rd place, bronze medalist(s)	Indonesia (INA)	495
4	South Korea (KOR)	490
5	Malaysia (MAS)	337
6	Saudi Arabia (KSA)	304
7	Qatar (QAT)	92
8	Afghanistan (AFG)	0
