= Beach soccer at the 2012 Asian Beach Games =

- Venue: Fengxiang Beach
- Dates: 16–21 June 2012

Beach soccer at the 2012 Asian Beach Games was held from 16 June to 21 June 2012 in Haiyang, China.

The draw to divide the 15 teams was conducted on 6 June 2012. All kickoff times are of local time in Haiyang (UTC+08:00).

== Medalists ==
Event	Gold	Silver	Bronze
Men	Iran; Hamed Ghorbanpour; Hassan Abdollahi; Mehdi Hassani; Ali Naderi; Mehran Morshedizadeh; Farid Boloukbashi; Mohammad Ali Mokhtari; Moslem Mesigar; Mohammad Ahmadzadeh; Peyman Hosseini	China; Han Yingnan; Han Xuegeng; Liu Yisi; Sun Guanrong; Liyihanmu Aihaiti; Tuluxun Maimaiti; Cai Weiming; Qiu Hao; Wan Chao; Sun Di	Palestine; Iyad Dwaima; Fady Jaber; Hamada Shbair; Sami Salim; Saeb Jendeya; Motaz Al-Nahhal; Alaa Atiya; Mohammed Al-Sdudi; Mohammed Barakat

== Results ==
=== Preliminary round ===
==== Group A ====
Pos	Team	Pld	W	W+	L	GF	GA	GD	Pts
1	Palestine	3	3	0	0	18	6	+12	9
2	China	3	1	1	1	11	10	+1	5
3	Vietnam	3	1	0	2	7	10	−3	3
4	Afghanistan	3	0	0	3	7	17	−10	0

Source: OCA
16 June
11:30

China	6–4	Afghanistan
Han Xuegeng 4', 18' (pen.); Tuluxun Maimaiti 11'; Liyihanmu Aihaiti 12' (pen.), 15'; Cai Weiming 22'		Mohammadi 2'; Safa 4', 28', 34'

Fengxiang Beach, Haiyang
Referee: Ebrahim Al-Mansoori (United Arab Emirates)

16 June
12:45

Vietnam	2–6	Palestine
Lê Kim Tuấn 5'; Phùng Ngọc Vĩnh Quý 28'		Barakat 11'; Jaber 14'; Shbair 15', 19', 28'; Atiya 24'

Fengxiang Beach, Haiyang
Referee: Suhaimi Mat Hassan (Malaysia)

17 June
19:00

Afghanistan	3–4	Vietnam
Mohammadi 16', 36'; Akbari 23'		Phùng Ngọc Vĩnh Quý 2', 13', 24'; Nguyễn Xuân Huy 18'

Fengxiang Beach, Haiyang
Referee: Nakorn Saard (Thailand)

17 June
20:30

China	4–5	Palestine
Han Xuegeng 20', 21'; Wan Chao 24'; Liyihanmu Aihaiti 32'		Atiya 1', 7', 21'; Barakat 19'; Salim 27'

Fengxiang Beach, Haiyang
Referee: Suwat Wongsuwan (Thailand)

18 June
19:00

Palestine	7–0	Afghanistan
Atiya 8'; Al-Nahhal 10'; Shbair 10'; Al-Sdudi 12', 36'; Salim 12'; Barakat 36'

Fengxiang Beach, Haiyang
Referee: Abdulaziz Abdullah (Kuwait)

18 June
20:30

China	1–1 (a.e.t.)	Vietnam
Wan Chao 29'		Lê Ngọc Phước 30'
Penalties
Wan Chao (penalty scored); Liyihanmu Aihaiti (penalty scored); Liu Yisi (penalty scored)	3–2	(penalty scored) Lê Kim Tuấn; (penalty scored) Phùng Ngọc Vĩnh Quý; (penalty missed) Nguyễn Văn Luận

Fengxiang Beach, Haiyang
Referee: Suhaimi Mat Hassan (Malaysia)

==== Group B ====
Pos	Team	Pld	W	W+	L	GF	GA	GD	Pts
1	Syria	2	2	0	0	11	8	+3	6
2	Oman	2	1	0	1	11	8	+3	3
3	Iraq	2	0	0	2	3	9	−6	0

Source: OCA
16 June
11:30

Oman	5–1	Iraq
Al-Dhabit 8'; Al-Araimi 15', 28'; Al-Rajhi 16'; Al-Sinani 19'		Jabbar 4'

Fengxiang Beach, Haiyang
Referee: Abdulaziz Abdullah (Kuwait)

17 June
13:30

Syria	4–2	Iraq
Nassif 8', 18'; Dyarbakerli 24'; Adrah 29'		Mahdi 16', 36'

Fengxiang Beach, Haiyang
Referee: Ahn Gwang-jin (South Korea)

18 June
10:30

Oman	6–7	Syria
Al-Rajhi 3', 33'; Al-Balushi 10' (pen.); Harib 17'; Al-Dhabit 25'; Al-Araimi 33'		Sleman 12', 31'; Ahmad 13', 33'; Nassif 29'; Dyarbakerli 33'; Adrah 34'

Fengxiang Beach, Haiyang
Referee: Mansour Al-Shammari (Saudi Arabia)

==== Group C ====
Pos	Team	Pld	W	W+	L	GF	GA	GD	Pts
1	Lebanon	3	3	0	0	19	9	+10	9
2	United Arab Emirates	3	2	0	1	13	11	+2	6
3	Bahrain	3	1	0	2	10	13	−3	3
4	Independent Olympic Athletes	3	0	0	3	4	13	−9	0

Source: OCA
16 June
10:15

United Arab Emirates	5–1	Independent Olympic Athletes
Karim 3', 10', 34'; Al-Zaabi 19'; Daryaei 28'		Al-Safi 32'

Fengxiang Beach, Haiyang
Referee: Tasuku Onodera (Japan)

16 June
10:15

Bahrain	5–6	Lebanon
Marhoon 3', 13'; Hasan 5'; Darwish 10'; Salman 19'		Merhi 15', 22' (pen.); Matar 18'; Nassereddine 23', 29'; Fattal 27' (pen.)

Fengxiang Beach, Haiyang
Referee: Suwat Wongsuwan (Thailand)

17 June
10:30

United Arab Emirates	3–8	Lebanon
Al-Zaabi 18'; Karim 20', 33'		Fattal 3', 3', 13', 19', 28', 34'; Merhi 13'; Halawi 17'

Fengxiang Beach, Haiyang
Referee: Ebrahim Akbarpour (Iran)

17 June
12:00

Independent Olympic Athletes	2–3	Bahrain
Al-Saqer 7'; Al-Safi 28'		Hasan 3'; Marhoon 12'; Abdullatif 32'

Fengxiang Beach, Haiyang
Referee: Wan Mohd Tarmizi (Malaysia)

18 June
15:00

United Arab Emirates	5–2	Bahrain
Karim 3', 28'; Abbas 3'; Ranjabar 10'; Al-Zaabi 14' (pen.)		Darwish 24'; J. Al-Doseri 28'

Fengxiang Beach, Haiyang
Referee: Tasuku Onodera (Japan)

18 June
16:30

Lebanon	5–1	Independent Olympic Athletes
Hawila 5'; Matar 13', 20'; Nassereddine 30'; Fattal 35'		Al-Adwani 1'

Fengxiang Beach, Haiyang
Referee: Wan Mohd Tarmizi (Malaysia)

==== Group D ====
Pos	Team	Pld	W	W+	L	GF	GA	GD	Pts
1	Iran	3	3	0	0	18	5	+13	9
2	Japan	3	2	0	1	7	4	+3	6
3	Thailand	3	1	0	2	4	8	−4	3
4	Qatar	3	0	0	3	3	15	−12	0

Source: OCA
16 June
9:00

Iran	10–2	Qatar
Naderi 1', 18' (pen.); Mokhtari 12', 30', 35', 36'; Ahmadzadeh 16'; Morshedizadeh 18'; Ghorbanpour 19'; Hassani 20'		Al-Rumaihi 13' (pen.); Al-Ishaq 22'

Fengxiang Beach, Haiyang
Referee: Suhaimi Mat Hassan (Malaysia)

16 June
9:00

Japan	2–1	Thailand
Yamauchi 10'; Asami 31'		Nanan 27'

Fengxiang Beach, Haiyang
Referee: Abdullah Al-Rashdi (Oman)

17 June
15:00

Iran	5–1	Thailand
Naderi 6'; Boloukbashi 10', 12', 22'; Mesigar 12'		Nanan 24'

Fengxiang Beach, Haiyang
Referee: Li Ke (China)

17 June
16:30

Qatar	0–3	Japan
		Yamauchi 17'; Makino 19'; Sakaguchi 25'

Fengxiang Beach, Haiyang
Referee: Mansour Al-Shammari (Saudi Arabia)

18 June
12:00

Iran	3–2	Japan
Naderi 13'; Mokhtari 24'; Hassani 35'		Tabata 4'; Asami 24'

Fengxiang Beach, Haiyang
Referee: Abdullah Al-Rashdi (Oman)

18 June
13:30

Thailand	2–1	Qatar
Nanan 4'; Durnee 31'		J. Al-Ioaari 12'

Fengxiang Beach, Haiyang
Referee: Li Ke (China)

=== Knockout round ===
Quarterfinals
19 June
Syria	1
China	4
19 June
Lebanon (a.e.t.)	5
Japan	4
19 June
Iran	4
United Arab Emirates	3
19 June
Palestine	4
Oman	3

Semifinals
20 June
China	5
Lebanon	1
20 June
Iran	9
Palestine	1

Gold medal match
21 June
China	0
Iran	2
Bronze medal match
21 June
Lebanon	5
Palestine	6

==== Quarterfinals ====
19 June
15:00

Palestine	4–3	Oman
Jaber 13'; Shbair 16'; Al-Sdudi 16'; Salim 24'		Al-Sinani 22'; Al-Araimi 28'; Al-Dhabit 33'

Fengxiang Beach, Haiyang
Referee: Suwat Wongsuwan (Thailand)

19 June
16:15

Lebanon	5–4 (a.e.t.)	Japan
Matar 13'; Fattal 14' (pen.), 36'; Merhi 31'; Al-Saleh 32'		Komaki 3'; Yamauchi 4'; Kawaharazuka 23'; Asami 23'

Fengxiang Beach, Haiyang
Referee: Ebrahim Al-Mansoori (United Arab Emirates)

19 June
19:00

Iran	4–3	United Arab Emirates
Ahmadzadeh 2', 33'; Mokhtari 19'; Naderi 36'		Karim 8'; Sadeqi 11'; Al-Zaabi 26'

Fengxiang Beach, Haiyang
Referee: Tasuku Onodera (Japan)

19 June
20:15

Syria	1–4	China
Nassif 9'		Cai Weiming 1'; Liyihanmu Aihaiti 9'; Han Xuegeng 22', 36'

Fengxiang Beach, Haiyang
Referee: Suhaimi Mat Hassan (Malaysia)

==== Semifinals ====
20 June
18:30

Iran	9–1	Palestine
Ahmadzadeh 4', 19', 33'; Morshedizadeh 12'; Abdollahi 13'; Mesigar 15'; Boloukbashi 16'; Naderi 29'; Hosseini 30'		Barakat 32'

Fengxiang Beach, Haiyang
Referee: Abdulaziz Abdullah (Kuwait)

20 June
20:00

China	5–1	Lebanon
Han Xuegeng 8'; Cai Weiming 9'; Wan Chao 22', 26'; Liu Yisi 26'		Fattal 27'

Fengxiang Beach, Haiyang
Referee: Ebrahim Al-Mansoori (United Arab Emirates)

==== Bronze medal match ====
21 June
18:30

Lebanon	5–6	Palestine
Merhi 11', 28'; Nassereddine 14'; Al-Saleh 32'; Matar 34'		Atiya 3', 9'; Al-Sdudi 6'; Salim 15', 21'; Shbair 33'

Fengxiang Beach, Haiyang
Referee: Li Ke (China)

==== Gold medal match ====
21 June
20:00

China	0–2	Iran
		Abdollahi 21'; Ahmadzadeh 34'

Fengxiang Beach, Haiyang
Referee: Tasuku Onodera (Japan)

== Goalscorers ==
11 goals

- Haitham Fattal (LIB)

8 goals

- Ali Hassan Karim (UAE)

7 goals

- Han Xuegeng (CHN)
- Mohammad Ahmadzadeh (IRI)
- Alaa Atiya (PLE)

6 goals

- Mohammad Ali Mokhtari (IRI)
- Ali Naderi (IRI)
- Mohamad Merhi (LIB)
- Hamada Shbair (PLE)

5 goals

- Mohamad Mechleb Matar (LIB)
- Sami Salim (PLE)

4 goals

- Liyihanmu Aihaiti (CHN)
- Wan Chao (CHN)
- Farid Boloukbashi (IRI)
- Ali Nassereddine (LIB)
- Yahya Al-Araimi (OMA)
- Mohammed Al-Sdudi (PLE)
- Mohammed Barakat (PLE)
- Mohammad Nassif (SYR)
- Mohamed Al-Zaabi (UAE)
- Phùng Ngọc Vĩnh Quý (VIE)

3 goals

- Samiullah Mohammadi (AFG)
- Faisal Safa (AFG)
- Sadeq Marhoon (BRN)
- Cai Weiming (CHN)
- Kazumasa Asami (JPN)
- Shusei Yamauchi (JPN)
- Hani Al-Dhabit (OMA)
- Khalid Al-Rajhi (OMA)
- Komkrit Nanan (THA)

2 goals

- Mohamed Darwish (BRN)
- Ebrahim Hasan (BRN)
- Abdulwahhab Al-Safi (IOA)
- Hassan Abdollahi (IRI)
- Mehdi Hassani (IRI)
- Moslem Mesigar (IRI)
- Mehran Morshedizadeh (IRI)
- Ali Mahdi (IRQ)
- Hussein Al-Saleh (LIB)
- Jalal Al-Sinani (OMA)
- Fady Jaber (PLE)
- Mohammad Adrah (SYR)
- Mohammad Cheikh Ahmad (SYR)
- Omar Dyarbakerli (SYR)
- Ali Sleman (SYR)

1 goal

- Mohammad Anwar Akbari (AFG)
- Abdulla Abdullatif (BRN)
- Jasim Al-Doseri (BRN)
- Ebrahim Abdulla Salman (BRN)
- Liu Yisi (CHN)
- Tuluxun Maimaiti (CHN)
- Hamed Ghorbanpour (IRI)
- Peyman Hosseini (IRI)
- Hussein Jabbar (IRQ)
- Takeshi Kawaharazuka (JPN)
- Masayuki Komaki (JPN)
- Shinji Makino (JPN)
- Kento Sakaguchi (JPN)
- Teruki Tabata (JPN)
- Mohammad Al-Adwani (KUW)
- Youssef Al-Saqer (KUW)
- Mohamad Halawi (LIB)
- Mahmoud Hawila (LIB)
- Faisal Al-Balushi (OMA)
- Haitham Harib (OMA)
- Motaz Al-Nahhal (PLE)
- Jafal Al-Ioaari (QAT)
- Abdulla Al-Ishaq (QAT)
- Ibrahim Al-Rumaihi (QAT)
- Teerawat Durnee (THA)
- Mohamed Abbas (UAE)
- Abbas Daryaei (UAE)
- Adel Ranjabar (UAE)
- Qambar Sadeqi (UAE)
- Lê Kim Tuấn (VIE)
- Lê Ngọc Phước (VIE)
- Nguyễn Xuân Huy (VIE)
