= Beach kabaddi at the 2012 Asian Beach Games =

- Venue: Fengxiang Beach
- Dates: 19–22 June 2012

Beach kabaddi at the 2012 Asian Beach Games was held from 19 June to 22 June 2012 in Haiyang, China.

== Medalists ==
Event	Gold	Silver	Bronze
Men	Iran; Mohammad Maghsoudloo; Meraj Sheikh; Kianoush Naderian; Gholam Abbas Korouki; Farhad Rahimi	Pakistan; Nasir Ali; Wajid Ali; Muhammad Khalid; Abrar Khan; Akhlaq Hussain; Ibrar Hussain	Sri Lanka; Anuruddika de Silva; Saheevan Rathakrushnan; Sajith Indra Kumara; Sinotharan Kanesharajah; Ranidu Chamara; Kapila Bandara
Men	Iran; Mohammad Maghsoudloo; Meraj Sheikh; Kianoush Naderian; Gholam Abbas Korouki; Farhad Rahimi	Pakistan; Nasir Ali; Wajid Ali; Muhammad Khalid; Abrar Khan; Akhlaq Hussain; Ibrar Hussain	India; Surjeet Kumar; Rajaguru Subramanian; Anup Kumar; Thimmarayappa Gopalappa; Manjeet Chhillar; Pathapalam Suresh
Women	India; Mamatha Poojary; Kavita Devi; Priyanka Negi; Marshalmary Savariyappan; Randeep Kaur Khehra; Priyanka	Thailand; Tanatporn Srijan; Jirawan Jareonroop; Krittaya Kwangkunthot; Naleerat Ketsaro; Jeerawan Namchiangtai; Kamontip Suwanchana	Bangladesh; Fatema Akhter Poly; Maleka Parvin; Rupali Akhter; Kazi Shahin Ara; Sharmin Sultana Rima; Kochi Rani Mondal
Women	India; Mamatha Poojary; Kavita Devi; Priyanka Negi; Marshalmary Savariyappan; Randeep Kaur Khehra; Priyanka	Thailand; Tanatporn Srijan; Jirawan Jareonroop; Krittaya Kwangkunthot; Naleerat Ketsaro; Jeerawan Namchiangtai; Kamontip Suwanchana	Sri Lanka; Kokila Edirisinghe; Sugandy Piyarathnage; Chamila Prasangika Perera; Madushani Chathurika; Dilini Wirapperuma; Deepika Sanjeewani Pawith

== Medal table ==
Rank	Nation	Gold	Silver	Bronze	Total
1	India (IND)	1	0	1	2
2	Iran (IRI)	1	0	0	1
3	Pakistan (PAK)	0	1	0	1
3	Thailand (THA)	0	1	0	1
5	Sri Lanka (SRI)	0	0	2	2
6	Bangladesh (BAN)	0	0	1	1
Totals (6 entries)		2	2	4	8

== Results ==
=== Men ===
==== Preliminary round ====
===== Group A =====
Pos	Team	Pld	W	D	L	PF	PA	PD	Pts
1	Iran	2	2	0	0	90	59	+31	4
2	India	2	1	0	1	72	67	+5	2
3	South Korea	2	0	0	2	52	88	−36	0

Source: OCA

19 June
16:00

Iran	48–27 (HT: 26–13)	South Korea

Fengxiang Beach, Haiyang

20 June
16:00

India	40–25 (HT: 24–10)	South Korea

Fengxiang Beach, Haiyang

21 June
9:00

India	32–42 (HT: 14–19)	Iran

Fengxiang Beach, Haiyang

===== Group B =====
Pos	Team	Pld	W	D	L	PF	PA	PD	Pts
1	Pakistan	3	3	0	0	145	75	+70	6
2	Sri Lanka	3	2	0	1	126	98	+28	4
3	Thailand	3	1	0	2	125	136	−11	2
4	Afghanistan	3	0	0	3	84	171	−87	0

Source: OCA

19 June
17:00

Pakistan	58–27 (HT: 29–15)	Afghanistan

Fengxiang Beach, Haiyang

19 June
18:00

Thailand	38–52 (HT: 18–22)	Sri Lanka

Fengxiang Beach, Haiyang

20 June
17:00

Pakistan	35–21 (HT: 21–8)	Sri Lanka

Fengxiang Beach, Haiyang

20 June
18:00

Afghanistan	32–60 (HT: 15–32)	Thailand

Fengxiang Beach, Haiyang

21 June
10:00

Pakistan	52–27 (HT: 35–10)	Thailand

Fengxiang Beach, Haiyang

21 June
11:00

Sri Lanka	53–25 (HT: 31–8)	Afghanistan

Fengxiang Beach, Haiyang

==== Knockout round ====
Semifinals
21 June
Iran	50
Sri Lanka	23
21 June
Pakistan	32
India	30

Gold medal match
22 June
Iran	39
Pakistan	33

===== Semifinals =====
21 June
17:00

Iran	50–23 (HT: 26–15)	Sri Lanka

Fengxiang Beach, Haiyang

21 June
18:00

Pakistan	32–30 (HT: 14–16)	India

Fengxiang Beach, Haiyang

===== Gold medal match =====
22 June
10:00

Iran	39–33 (HT: 17–13)	Pakistan

Fengxiang Beach, Haiyang

=== Women ===
==== Preliminary round ====
Pos	Team	Pld	W	D	L	PF	PA	PD	Pts
1	India	3	3	0	0	155	99	+56	6
2	Thailand	3	2	0	1	156	120	+36	4
3	Bangladesh	3	1	0	2	121	150	−29	2
4	Sri Lanka	3	0	0	3	115	178	−63	0

Source: OCA

19 June
9:00

Bangladesh	56–49 (HT: 27–25)	Sri Lanka

Fengxiang Beach, Haiyang

19 June
10:00

Thailand	40–48 (HT: 18–27)	India

Fengxiang Beach, Haiyang

20 June
9:00

Bangladesh	28–50 (HT: 16–27)	India

Fengxiang Beach, Haiyang

20 June
10:00

Sri Lanka	35–65 (HT: 16–35)	Thailand

Fengxiang Beach, Haiyang

21 June
12:00

Bangladesh	37–51 (HT: 22–23)	Thailand

Fengxiang Beach, Haiyang

21 June
16:00

India	57–31 (HT: 31–12)	Sri Lanka

Fengxiang Beach, Haiyang

==== Gold medal match ====
22 June
9:00

India	54–25 (HT: 27–12)	Thailand

Fengxiang Beach, Haiyang
