= Saeb Jendeya =

Palestinian footballer (born 1975)

Personal information
- Date of birth: 13 May 1975 (age 51)
- Place of birth: Gaza, Palestine
- Height: 1.78 m (5 ft 10 in)
- Position: Defender

Youth career
- 1987–1992: Ittihad Al-Shajiya

Senior career*
Years	Team	Apps	(Gls)
1992–2002	Ittihad Al-Shajiya		
2002–2003	Al-Hussein Irbid		
2003–2012	Ittihad Al-Shajiya		

International career
1998–2009	Palestine	70	(1)

Managerial career
- 2014: Palestine
Medal record
Men's beach soccer
Representing Palestine
Asian Beach Games
Bronze medal – third place	2012 Haiyang	Team
- * Club domestic league appearances and goals

Saeb Jendeya (Arabic: صائب جندية; born 13 May 1975) is a Palestinian former football player and coach.

== International career ==
=== Football ===
Jendeya played as a defender, and amassed 70 caps since Palestine's induction into FIFA in 1998. He is the former captain of the Palestinian national team and served as captain from 1999 to his retirement from international football in 2009. Jendeya has scored one goal with the national team- a midfield shot against Libya in injury-time that leveled the score at 2-2 in the 1999 Pan-Arab Games.

=== Beach soccer ===
He captained Palestine's beach soccer team to a third-place finish at the 2012 Asian Beach Games.

== Managerial career ==
On 11 September 2014, Jendeya was named interim manager of Palestine national football team. However, before the 2015 AFC Asian Cup, he was sacked.

== Career statistics ==
=== International ===
Scores and results list Palestine's goal tally first, score column indicates score after each Jendeya goal.

List of international goals scored by Saeb Jendeya
No.	Date	Venue	Opponent	Score	Result	Competition
1	25 August 1999	Amman, Jordan	Libya	2–2	2–2	1999 Arab Games
