= Beach sepak takraw at the 2012 Asian Beach Games =

- Venue: Fengxiang Beach
- Dates: 16–22 June 2012

Beach sepak takraw at the 2012 Asian Beach Games was held from 16 June to 22 June 2012 in Haiyang, China.

== Medalists ==
Event	Gold	Silver	Bronze
Men's regu	Thailand; Phakpong Dejaroen; Akkasit Hanpatub; Uthen Kukheaw; Sornpithak Sriring; Komkid Suapimpa; Seksan Tubtong	China; Fan Xu; Ge Yusheng; Han Dong; Jin Jie; Li Huanhuan; Yang Jiapeng	Indonesia; Alfin Alim; Suko Hartono; Hendra Pago; Andi Paturay; Abdul Halim Radjiu; Husni Uba
Men's regu	Thailand; Phakpong Dejaroen; Akkasit Hanpatub; Uthen Kukheaw; Sornpithak Sriring; Komkid Suapimpa; Seksan Tubtong	China; Fan Xu; Ge Yusheng; Han Dong; Jin Jie; Li Huanhuan; Yang Jiapeng	Brunei; Ismail Ang; Mohd Basyiruddin Hj Kamis; Mohd Shukri Jaineh; Abdul Amin Mahari; Nur Alimin Sungoh; Mohd Azri Tahir
Men's team regu	Thailand; Wuttichai Dairungnoi; Phakpong Dejaroen; Akkasit Hanpatub; Sakol Jandong; Uthen Kukheaw; Phirathep Pantaeng; Aphisak Sarachon; Sornpithak Sriring; Komkid Suapimpa; Seksan Tubtong; Chatchai Wanprom; Jackrit Wijara	Indonesia; Saiyed Nur Adil; Alfin Alim; Sugeng Arifin; Suko Hartono; Haris Munandar; Rizky Abdul Rahman Pago; Hendra Pago; Andi Paturay; Abdul Halim Radjiu; Wisnu Dwi Suhantoro; Husni Uba; Yovi Hendra Utama	China; Fan Xu; Ge Yusheng; Han Dong; Jin Jie; Li Huanhuan; Tao Zhu; Wang Gang; Wang Jian; Wang Xu; Yang Jiapeng; Zhang Bo
Men's team regu	Thailand; Wuttichai Dairungnoi; Phakpong Dejaroen; Akkasit Hanpatub; Sakol Jandong; Uthen Kukheaw; Phirathep Pantaeng; Aphisak Sarachon; Sornpithak Sriring; Komkid Suapimpa; Seksan Tubtong; Chatchai Wanprom; Jackrit Wijara	Indonesia; Saiyed Nur Adil; Alfin Alim; Sugeng Arifin; Suko Hartono; Haris Munandar; Rizky Abdul Rahman Pago; Hendra Pago; Andi Paturay; Abdul Halim Radjiu; Wisnu Dwi Suhantoro; Husni Uba; Yovi Hendra Utama	None awarded
Women's regu	Thailand; Orathai Buasri; Siriphol Chaiyasit; Thiwaphon Nueangchamnong; Somruedee Pruepruk; Thidarat Soda; Apinya Thongpoo; Piyapan Tungjai	Vietnam; Đinh Thị Thúy Hằng; Nguyễn Thái Linh; Nguyễn Thị Mơ; Nguyễn Thị Quyên; Nguyễn Thị Hòa; Trần Hồng Nhung	Laos; Pathoumphone Phommachanh; Philavanh Chanthsily; Mithananh Bounpaseuth; Damdouane Lattanavongsa; Koy Xayavong
Women's regu	Thailand; Orathai Buasri; Siriphol Chaiyasit; Thiwaphon Nueangchamnong; Somruedee Pruepruk; Thidarat Soda; Apinya Thongpoo; Piyapan Tungjai	Vietnam; Đinh Thị Thúy Hằng; Nguyễn Thái Linh; Nguyễn Thị Mơ; Nguyễn Thị Quyên; Nguyễn Thị Hòa; Trần Hồng Nhung	China; Cui Yonghui; Gu Xihui; Liu Xiaofang; Wang Jianshuang; Zhang Yanan; Zhou Ronghong
Women's team regu	Thailand; Orathai Buasri; Siriphol Chaiyasit; Oranut Deemo; Sasiwimol Janthasit; Lampang Kaewnoppakun; Waree Nantasing; Thiwaphon Nueangchamnong; Somruedee Pruepruk; Thidarat Soda; Nisa Thanaattawut; Apinya Thongpoo; Piyapan Tungjai	Vietnam; Đinh Thị Thúy Hằng; Lý Thị Tú Kiều; Nguyễn Thái Linh; Nguyễn Thị Mơ; Nguyễn Thị Hồng; Nguyễn Thị Quyên; Nguyễn Thị Hòa; Phạm Thị Lan Phương; Thạch Thị Mỹ Linh; Thân Thị Khánh Linh; Trần Hồng Nhung	Indonesia; Seri Ayu Astuti; Gallih Desiari; Roslin Dida; Nur Hidayah; Jumasiah; Akyko Micheel Kapito; Nina Karmila; Ayu Lestari; Aliya Prihatini; Irma Wati; Nur Qadriyanti; Indra Yuliasti
Women's team regu	Thailand; Orathai Buasri; Siriphol Chaiyasit; Oranut Deemo; Sasiwimol Janthasit; Lampang Kaewnoppakun; Waree Nantasing; Thiwaphon Nueangchamnong; Somruedee Pruepruk; Thidarat Soda; Nisa Thanaattawut; Apinya Thongpoo; Piyapan Tungjai	Vietnam; Đinh Thị Thúy Hằng; Lý Thị Tú Kiều; Nguyễn Thái Linh; Nguyễn Thị Mơ; Nguyễn Thị Hồng; Nguyễn Thị Quyên; Nguyễn Thị Hòa; Phạm Thị Lan Phương; Thạch Thị Mỹ Linh; Thân Thị Khánh Linh; Trần Hồng Nhung	China; Cui Yongyan; Cui Yonghui; Gu Xihui; Huo Jinnan; Lao Tianxue; Li Siyao; Liu Xiaofang; Wang Jianshuang; Wang Qiyue; Zhang Yanan; Zhao Tengfei; Zhou Ronghong

== Medal table ==
Rank	Nation	Gold	Silver	Bronze	Total
1	Thailand (THA)	4	0	0	4
2	Vietnam (VIE)	0	2	0	2
3	China (CHN)	0	1	3	4
4	Indonesia (INA)	0	1	2	3
5	Brunei (BRU)	0	0	1	1
5	Laos (LAO)	0	0	1	1
Totals (6 entries)		4	4	7	15

== Results ==
=== Men's regu ===
==== Preliminary round ====
===== Group A =====
Pos	Team	Pld	W	L	SF	SA	SD	Pts
1	Indonesia	2	2	0	6	2	+4	4
2	Brunei	2	1	1	5	3	+2	2
3	Myanmar	2	0	2	0	6	−6	0

Source: OCA

Date		Score		Set 1	Set 2	Set 3	Set 4	Set 5
20 Jun	Indonesia	3–0	Myanmar	Walkover				
20 Jun	Brunei	2–3	Indonesia	10–15	15–13	8–15	16–14	14–16
21 Jun	Myanmar	0–3	Brunei	Walkover				

===== Group B =====
Pos	Team	Pld	W	L	SF	SA	SD	Pts
1	Thailand	2	2	0	6	0	+6	4
2	China	2	1	1	3	3	0	2
3	Vietnam	2	0	2	0	6	−6	0

Source: OCA

Date		Score		Set 1	Set 2	Set 3	Set 4	Set 5
20 Jun	China	0–3	Thailand	5–15	5–15	6–15		
20 Jun	Vietnam	0–3	China	9–15	8–15	12–15		
21 Jun	Thailand	3–0	Vietnam	15–5	15–9	15–7		

==== Knockout round ====
Semifinals; 21 June						Gold medal match 22 June
Indonesia	14	9	15	15	7
China	16	15	12	9	15	China	4	16	11
Thailand	15	15	15			Thailand	15	17	15
Brunei	4	8	7

=== Men's team regu ===
Pos	Team	Pld	W	L	MF	MA	MD	Pts
1	Thailand	3	3	0	6	0	+6	6
2	Indonesia	3	2	1	4	2	+2	4
3	China	3	1	2	2	4	−2	2
—	Myanmar	3	0	3	0	6	−6	0

Source: OCA

Date		Score		Regu 1	Regu 2	Regu 3
16 Jun	China	0–2	Thailand	0–2	0–2	
17 Jun	Myanmar	0–2	Indonesia	Walkover		
17 Jun	China	0–2	Indonesia	1–2	0–2	
18 Jun	Thailand	2–0	Myanmar	Walkover		
18 Jun	China	2–0	Myanmar	Walkover		
19 Jun	Indonesia	0–2	Thailand	0–2	0–2	

=== Women's regu ===
Pos	Team	Pld	W	L	SF	SA	SD	Pts
1	Thailand	4	4	0	12	0	+12	8
2	Vietnam	4	3	1	9	3	+6	6
3	Laos	4	1	3	5	10	−5	2
4	China	4	1	3	4	9	−5	2
5	Indonesia	4	1	3	3	11	−8	2

Source: OCA

Date		Score		Set 1	Set 2	Set 3	Set 4	Set 5
19 Jun	Indonesia	3–2	Laos	11–15	17–16	15–8	15–17	15–3
19 Jun	Thailand	3–0	Vietnam	15–13	15–6	15–9		
20 Jun	China	1–3	Laos	12–15	15–10	13–15	12–15	
20 Jun	Indonesia	0–3	Thailand	10–15	4–10	7–15		
20 Jun	China	0–3	Vietnam	12–15	9–15	7–15		
20 Jun	Laos	0–3	Thailand	7–15	11–15	5–15		
21 Jun	China	0–3	Thailand	9–15	6–15	7–15		
21 Jun	Vietnam	3–0	Indonesia	15–8	15–10	15–7		
21 Jun	China	3–0	Indonesia	15–8	15–13	15–13		
21 Jun	Vietnam	3–0	Laos	15–11	15–8	15–8		

=== Women's team regu ===
Pos	Team	Pld	W	L	MF	MA	MD	Pts
1	Thailand	3	3	0	6	0	+6	6
2	Vietnam	3	2	1	4	4	0	4
3	Indonesia	3	1	2	3	4	−1	2
4	China	3	0	3	1	6	−5	0

Source: OCA

Date		Score		Regu 1	Regu 2	Regu 3
16 Jun	Indonesia	2–0	China	2–0	2–0	
17 Jun	Thailand	2–0	Vietnam	2–0	2–1	
17 Jun	Indonesia	1–2	Vietnam	1–2	2–0	1–2
18 Jun	China	0–2	Thailand	1–2	0–2	
18 Jun	Indonesia	0–2	Thailand	0–2	0–2	
19 Jun	Vietnam	2–1	China	2–0	1–2	2–1
