= Chuda Kumari Khadka =

Nepalese volleyball player (born 1986)

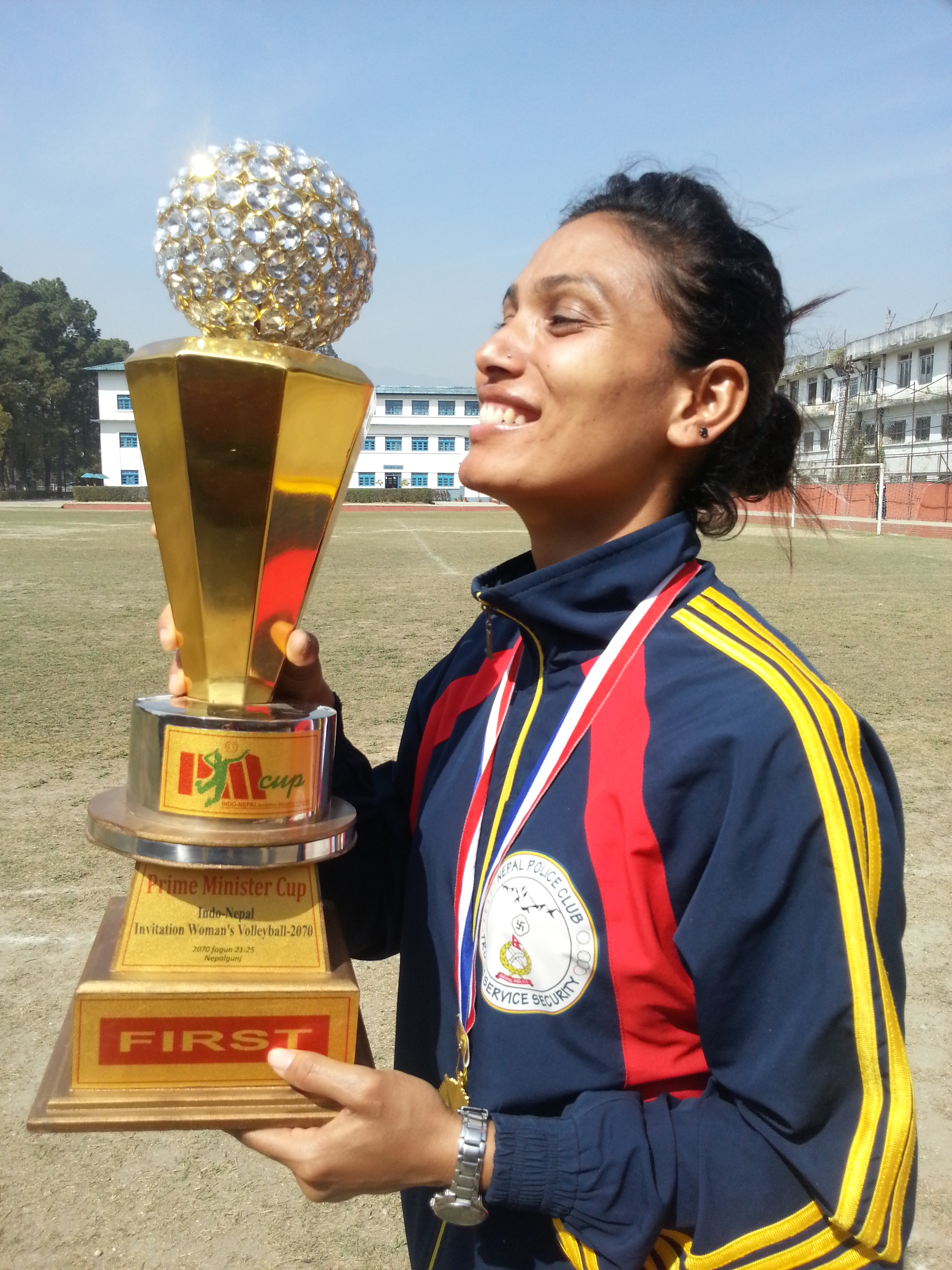

Personal information
- Nationality: Nepali
- Born: October 28, 1986 (age 40); Okhaldhunga, Nepal

Volleyball information
- Position: Right-side hitter
- Current club: Nepal Police Club
- Number: 4

Career
Years	Teams
2007	Nepal Police Club

National team
2005	Nepal women's national volleyball team
Honours
SAG 2006
Bronze medal – third place	Women's volleyball	Team

Chuda Kumari Khadka (Nepali: चुडा कुमारी खड्का) (born 28 October 1986) is a Nepalese volleyball player. She plays for Nepal women's national volleyball team and Nepal Police Club. She participated at the 2012 Asian Beach Games in Haiyang, China and South Asian Games 2006 in Colombo, Sri Lanka and 2010 in Dhaka, Bangladesh.
