= Japan at the 2012 Asian Beach Games =

- IOC code: JPN
- NOC: Japanese Olympic Committee
- Website: https://www.joc.or.jp

in Haiyang, China June 12 – June 22
- Competitors: 85 in 7 sports
- Medals Ranked 8th: Gold 1 Silver 3 Bronze 2 Total 6

Asian Beach Games appearances
- 2008; 2010; 2012; 2014; 2016; 2026

Japan competed in the 2012 Asian Beach Games in Haiyang, China from June 12 to June 22, 2012. The delegation was bannered by 82 athletes. Japan send their representatives in 7 sports including beach soccer, beach volleyball, beach handball, sport climbing, dragon boat, roller speed skating, and water skiing.

The delegation collected a gold, three silver, and two bronze medals at the game. The medals came from only two sports, sport climbing and water skiing. The only gold for the country achieved by Atsushi Shimizu in men's bouldering event at sport climbing. The sport also got three silver medals from Tsukuru Hori, Sachi Anma, and Akiyo Noguchi. While the bronze came from sport climber Yuka Kobayashi and water skier Hiroko Komori.

== Medalists ==
Medal	Name	Sport	Event	Date
Gold	Atsushi Shimizu	Sport climbing	Men's bouldering	June 19
Silver	Tsukuru Hori	Sport climbing	Men's bouldering	June 19
Silver	Akiyo Noguchi	Sport climbing	Women's bouldering	June 19
Silver	Sachi Anma	Sport climbing	Men's lead	June 20
Bronze	Yuka Kobayashi	Sport climbing	Women's lead	June 20
Bronze	Hiroko Komori	Waterskiing	Women's tricks	June 22

Medals by sport
Sport	1st place, gold medalist(s)	2nd place, silver medalist(s)	3rd place, bronze medalist(s)	Total
Sport climbing	1	3	1	4
Waterskiing	0	0	1	1
Total	1	3	2	6

== Competitors ==
Sport	Men	Women	Total
Beach handball	10	9	19
Beach soccer	10	0	10
Beach volleyball	4	4	8
Dragon boat	15	16	31
Roller speed skating	4	0	4
Sport climbng	4	3	7
Waterskiing	0	3	3
Total	47	35	82

== See also ==
- Japan at the Asian Games
