= Eri Marina Yo =

Personal information
- Born: September 2, 1987 (age 38) Jakarta, Indonesia
- Height: 1.68 m (5 ft 6 in)
- Weight: 65 kg (143 lb; 10.2 st)
- Website: Official Site

Sport
- Country: Indonesia
- Sport: Speed skating

Achievements and titles
- Personal best(s): 300 m: 28.001 (2012); 500 m: 44.264 (2012)
Medal record
Women's speed skating
Representing Indonesia Pekan Olahraga Nasional
| Gold medal – first place | PON XIX 2016 Bandung | 42km |
| Gold medal – first place | PON XIX 2016 Bandung | Relay 3km |
| Gold medal – first place | PON XVIII 2012 Riau | 300m |
| Gold medal – first place | PON XVIII 2012 Riau | 300m |
| Gold medal – first place | PON XVIII 2012 Riau | 1500m |
| Gold medal – first place | PON XVIII 2012 Riau | Relay 5km |
| Gold medal – first place | PON XVII 2008 Samarinda | 300m |
| Gold medal – first place | PON XVII 2008 Samarinda | 500m |
| Gold medal – first place | PON XVII 2008 Samarinda | 10km |
| Gold medal – first place | PON XVII 2008 Samarinda | Relay 10km |
| Gold medal – first place | PON XVI 2004 Palembang | 300m |
| Gold medal – first place | PON XVI 2004 Palembang | 500m |
| Gold medal – first place | PON XVI 2004 Palembang | 5km |
| Gold medal – first place | PON XVI 2004 Palembang | Relay 5km |
| Gold medal – first place | PON XV 2000 Malang | 5km |
| Gold medal – first place | PON XV 2000 Malang | Relay 5km |
| Silver medal – second place | PON XIX 2016 Bandung | 1000m |
| Silver medal – second place | PON XV 2000 Malang | 3km |

Eri Marina Yo (born September 2, 1987, in Jakarta, Indonesia) is an Indonesia inline speed skater.

Yo is the first Indonesian who received the highest score at the Asianic Inline Cup in which she was titled as overall leader. She won more than 33 championships with 99 medals in regional and world events.

== Career ==
She became the first athlete who set record in Indonesia National Games, Pekan Olahraga Nasional as four gold medalist, two times in consecutive, on 2004 and 2008. She represented East Kalimantan regional team on 2008 Pekan Olahraga Nasional, and represented Jakarta regional team at 2012 Pekan Olahraga Nasional in Riau. In 2011, she launched a roller sport school, Cross Roller Club, in Jakarta and Palembang.

=== 2011 Southeast Asian Games ===
Roller sports became a competition sport in Asian Games in Guangzhou, 2010 for the first time. Yo had been selected into roller sport national team to compete but withdrew. The following year, roller sport made its debut in Southeast Asian Games in Palembang, 2011, Yo had been called again into roller sport national team, but during the national training she had to withdraw due to a knee fracture injury.

=== 2012 Asian Beach Games ===
Indonesia has participated in 10 events, including the premiere of roller sport. The selection of Indonesia roller sport national team, was held on International Roller Skating competition in Sidoarjo, 2012. Yo won two gold medals in 500 m and 1500 m, and defeated Huang Yu Ting from Chinese Taipei, 2010 Asian Games gold medalist and Ajeng Prasalita from Indonesia, 2011 Southeast Asian Games gold medalist, and Yo was crowned to represent Indonesia in Roller speed skating at the 2012 Asian Beach Games.

Yo lives in Kaohsiung and has trained with the Chinese Taipei team since 2012. In March 2012 she fractured her clavicle and acromioclavicular joint while training. At the Asian Beach Games Haiyang, June 2012, Eri placed 6th rank in 200 m and 5th rank in 500 m.
