= 2012 Asian Beach Games =

2012 sporting event held in Haiyang, China

III Asian Beach Games
- Host city: Haiyang, China
- Motto: Share the Joy
- Nations: 43
- Athletes: 1,336
- Events: 49 in 13 sports
- Opening: June 16
- Closing: June 22
- Opened by: Ma Kai; State Councilor of China
- Torch lighter: Wu Qi
- Main venue: Haiyang International Conference Centre
- Website: haiyang2012.com

Hai Hai, Yang Yang, and Sha Sha, the official mascots.

The third Asian Beach Games were held in Haiyang, China in 2012.

== Sports ==
- 3x3 basketball (2)
- Beach handball (2)
- Beach kabaddi (2)
- Beach sepak takraw (4)
- Beach soccer (1)
- Beach volleyball (2)
- Beach woodball (4)
- Dragon boat (6)
- Paramotoring (3)
- Roller speed skating (8)
- Sailing (2)
- Sport climbing (8)
- Water skiing (4)

== Participating nations ==
43 out of 45 Asian countries participated in these games. The two countries that did not participate in the games, North Korea and Myanmar, only participated in the opening ceremony. According to the Games' official website, Kuwaiti athletes participated the Games under the Olympic flag because the Kuwait Olympic Committee was suspended due to political interference in January 2010.

- Afghanistan (34)
- Bahrain (25)
- Bangladesh (15)
- Bhutan (4)
- Brunei (6)
- Cambodia (4)
- China (160)
- Chinese Taipei (40)
- Timor-Leste (6)
- Hong Kong (80)
- Independent Olympic Athletes (29)
- India (64)
- Indonesia (106)
- Iran (23)
- Iraq (10)
- Japan (82)
- Jordan (7)
- Kazakhstan (6)
- Kyrgyzstan (4)
- Laos (5)
- Lebanon (10)
- Macau (34)
- Malaysia (24)
- Maldives (8)
- Mongolia (29)
- Nepal (17)
- Oman (24)
- Pakistan (18)
- Palestine (15)
- Philippines (33)
- Qatar (31)
- Saudi Arabia (5)
- Singapore (2)
- South Korea (43)
- Sri Lanka (32)
- Syria (10)
- Tajikistan (4)
- Thailand (160)
- Turkmenistan (23)
- United Arab Emirates (10)
- Uzbekistan (1)
- Vietnam (89)
- Yemen (4)

== Calendar ==
OC	Opening ceremony	●	Event competitions	1	Event finals	CC	Closing ceremony

June 2012	12th Tue	13th Wed	14th Thu	15th Fri	16th Sat	17th Sun	18th Mon	19th Tue	20th Wed	21st Thu	22nd Fri	Gold medals
3x3 basketball						●	●	2				2
Beach handball					●	●	●	●	●	●	2	2
Beach kabaddi								●	●	●	2	2
Beach sepak takraw					●	●	●	2	●	1	1	4
Beach soccer					●	●	●	●	●	1		1
Beach volleyball	●	●	●	●	●	●	2					2
Beach woodball							●	●	2	2		4
Dragon boat						2	2	2				6
Paramotoring						●	●	●	1	3		4
Roller speed skating						4	4					8
Sailing						●	●	●	●	2		2
Sport climbing						●	4	2	2			8
Water skiing									●	●	4	4
Total gold medals						6	12	8	5	9	9	49
Ceremonies					OC						CC	
June 2012	12th Tue	13th Wed	14th Thu	15th Fri	16th Sat	17th Sun	18th Mon	19th Tue	20th Wed	21st Thu	22nd Fri	Gold medals

== Medal table ==
* Host nation (China)

Rank	Nation	Gold	Silver	Bronze	Total
1	China (CHN)*	14	10	12	36
2	Thailand (THA)	13	9	6	28
3	South Korea (KOR)	6	7	10	23
4	Indonesia (INA)	6	6	4	16
5	Chinese Taipei (TPE)	3	6	6	15
6	India (IND)	2	0	1	3
7	Iran (IRI)	2	0	0	2
8	Japan (JPN)	1	3	2	6
9	Afghanistan (AFG)	1	0	0	1
9	Qatar (QAT)	1	0	0	1
11	Philippines (PHI)	0	2	2	4
12	Vietnam (VIE)	0	2	1	3
13	Kazakhstan (KAZ)	0	1	1	2
13	Pakistan (PAK)	0	1	1	2
15	Bahrain (BRN)	0	1	0	1
15	Turkmenistan (TKM)	0	1	0	1
17	Sri Lanka (SRI)	0	0	2	2
18	Bangladesh (BAN)	0	0	1	1
18	Brunei (BRU)	0	0	1	1
18	Laos (LAO)	0	0	1	1
18	Mongolia (MGL)	0	0	1	1
18	Palestine (PLE)	0	0	1	1
18	Singapore (SIN)	0	0	1	1
Totals (23 entries)		49	49	54	152
