= Vietnam at the 2012 Asian Beach Games =

- IOC code: VIE
- NOC: Vietnam Olympic Committee
- Website: www.voc.org.vn (in Vietnamese and English)

in Haiyang
- Competitors: 95 in 7 sports
- Medals Ranked 12th: Gold 0 Silver 2 Bronze 1 Total 3

Asian Beach Games appearances
- 2008; 2010; 2012; 2014; 2016; 2026

Vietnam participated in the 2012 Asian Beach Games in Haiyang, China on 16–22 July 2012.

The Vietnamese team comprised 95 athletes competing in 9 sports: Beach handball, Beach sepaktakraw, Beach soccer, Beach volleyball, Woodball, Sport climbing, Roller Skating, Beach Basketball, Dragon Boat .

== Competitors ==
Sport	Men	Women	Total
Dragon Boat	15	0	15
Beach Handball	9	10	19
Beach Soccer	10	0	10
Beach Sepaktakraw	6	11	17
Beach Volleyball	4	4	8
Beach Woodball	6	5	11
Sport climbing	4	0	4
Roller Skating	3	0	3
Beach Basketball	4	0	4
Total	65	30	95

== Medal summary ==
=== Medals table ===
Sport	Gold	Silver	Bronze	Total
Beach handball	0	0	1	1
Beach Sepaktakraw	0	2	0	2
Total	0	2	1	3

== Medalists ==
Medal	Name	Sport	Event	Date
Silver	Vietnam	Beach Sepaktakraw	Women's Team	Tuesday 19 June 2012
Bronze	Vietnam	Beach Handball	Women's team	Thursday 21 June 2012
Silver	Vietnam	Beach Sepaktakraw	Women's Regu	Friday 22 June 2012
