= Chinese Taipei at the 2012 Asian Beach Games =

- IOC code: TPE
- NOC: Chinese Taipei Olympic Committee
- Website: www.tpenoc.net

in Haiyang, China June 16 – June 22
- Competitors: 40 in 6 sports
- Medals Ranked 5th: Gold 3 Silver 6 Bronze 6 Total 15

Asian Beach Games appearances
- 2008; 2010; 2012; 2014; 2016; 2026

Chinese Taipei competed at the 2012 Asian Beach Games held in Haiyang, China from June 16 to 22, 2012. Chinese Taipei sent 40 athletes and competed in 6 sports.

They won a total of 15 medals, including 3 golds, 6 silvers and 6 bronzes. It earned the fifth position in the general medal table.

All 3 golds were won from roller speed skating, Kao Mao-chieh in Men's 200 m time trial Chen Yan-cheng in Men's 10000 m points, and Li Meng-chu in Women's 20000 m elimination. Kou Nai-han and Chang Hui-min won the bronze medal in beach volleyball.

== Medal summary ==
=== Medal by Sport ===
Medals by sport
Sport	1st place, gold medalist(s)	2nd place, silver medalist(s)	3rd place, bronze medalist(s)	Total
Beach handball	0	1	0	1
Beach volleyball	0	0	1	1
Beach woodball	0	2	2	4
Roller speed skating	3	3	3	9
Total	3	6	6	15
