= South Korea at the 2012 Asian Beach Games =

- IOC code: KOR
- NOC: Korean Olympic Committee

in Haiyang
- Competitors: 46 in 6 sports
- Officials: 19
- Medals Ranked 3rd: Gold 6 Silver 7 Bronze 10 Total 23

Asian Beach Games appearances
- 2008; 2010; 2012; 2014; 2016; 2026

South Korea participated in the 2012 Asian Beach Games in Haiyang, China on 16–22 June 2012.

Korea sent 46 athletes which will compete in 6 sports.

== Medal summary ==
=== Medals table ===
Sport	Gold	Silver	Bronze	Total
Roller speed skating	3	5	3	11
Sport climbing	3	1	5	9
Waterskiing	0	1	2	3
Total	6	7	10	23
