= Bangladesh at the 2012 Asian Beach Games =

- IOC code: BAN
- NOC: Bangladesh Olympic Association

in Haiyang
- Medals: Gold Silver Bronze 1 Total 1

Asian Beach Games appearances
- 2008; 2010; 2012; 2014; 2016

Bangladesh participated in the 2012 Asian Beach Games in Haiyang, China on 16–22 June 2012. Bangladesh also won 1 bronze medal, finishing first on the medal table.
