= Thailand at the 2012 Asian Beach Games =

- IOC code: THA
- NOC: National Olympic Committee of Thailand
- Website: www.olympicthai.or.th/eng (in English and Thai)

in Haiyang
- Medals Ranked 2nd: Gold 13 Silver 9 Bronze 6 Total 28

Asian Beach Games appearances
- 2008; 2010; 2012; 2014; 2016; 2026

Thailand competed at the 2012 Asian Beach Games held in Haiyang, China from June 16 to 22, 2012. Thailand won total 28 medals, including 13 golds, 9 silvers and 6 bronzes. It earned second position in the general medal table.

== Medal summary ==
=== Medals table ===
Sport	Gold	Silver	Bronze	Total
Beach Woodball	4	2	0	6
Beach Sepaktakraw	4	0	0	4
Powered Paragliding	3	3	1	7
Beach Volleyball	1	0	0	1
Waterskiing	1	0	0	1
Sailing	0	2	1	3
Dragon Boat	0	1	4	5
Beach Kabaddi	0	1	0	1
Total	13	9	6	28

== Medalists ==
Medal	Name	Sport	Event	Date
Gold	Chinnakrit Imkrajang	Beach Woodball	Men's Singles	21 June
Gold	Praewpan Chaithong	Beach Woodball	Women's Singles	21 June
Gold	Thailand	Beach Woodball	Men's Team	20 June
Gold	Thailand	Beach Woodball	Women's Team	20 June
Gold	Thailand	Beach Sepaktakraw	Men's Regu	22 June
Gold	Thailand	Beach Sepaktakraw	Women's Regu	21 June
Gold	Thailand	Beach Sepaktakraw	Men's Team	19 June
Gold	Thailand	Beach Sepaktakraw	Women's Team	19 June
Gold	Thailand	Powered Paragliding	Team combined	21 June
Gold	Jiri George Macak	Powered Paragliding	Individual precision	21 June
Gold	Jiri George Macak	Powered Paragliding	Individual combined	21 June
Gold	Thailand	Beach Volleyball	Women	18 June
Gold	Tatsanai Kuakoonrat	Waterskiing	Men's wakeboard	22 June
Silver	Klayut Mongkholsamai	Beach Woodball	Men's Singles	21 June
Silver	Siripat Karinit	Beach Woodball	Women's Singles	21 June
Silver	Jiri George Macak	Powered Paragliding	Individual economy	20 June
Silver	Kittiphop Phrommat	Powered Paragliding	Individual precision	21 June
Silver	Kittiphop Phrommat	Powered Paragliding	Individual combined	21 June
Silver	Navin Singsart	Sailing	Men's Techno 293	21 June
Silver	Siripon Kaewduang-Ngam	Sailing	Women's Techno 293	21 June
Silver	Thailand	Dragon boat racing	Men's 3000 m	19 June
Silver	Thailand	Beach Kabaddi	Women	22 June
Bronze	Kittiphop Phrommat	Powered Paragliding	Individual economy	20 June
Bronze	Natthaphong Phonoppharat	Sailing	Men's Techno 293	21 June
Bronze	Thailand	Dragon boat racing	Men's 500 m	17 June
Bronze	Thailand	Dragon boat racing	Women's 200 m	18 June
Bronze	Thailand	Dragon boat racing	Women's 500 m	17 June
Bronze	Thailand	Dragon boat racing	Women's 3000 m	19 June
