= Indonesia at the 2012 Asian Beach Games =

- IOC code: INA
- NOC: Indonesian Olympic Committee
- Website: www.nocindonesia.or.id (in English)

in Haiyang
- Competitors: 106 in 8 sports
- Medals Ranked 4th: Gold 6 Silver 6 Bronze 4 Total 16

Asian Beach Games appearances
- 2008; 2010; 2012; 2014; 2016; 2026

Indonesia competed at the 2012 Asian Beach Games held in Haiyang, China from June 16 to 22, 2012.

Indonesia sent 106 athletes which competed in 8 sports.

== Medal summary ==
=== Medal table ===
Sport	Gold	Silver	Bronze	Total
Dragon boat	4	2	0	6
Sport climbing	1	2	1	4
Beach volleyball	1	0	0	1
Beach sepak takraw	0	1	2	3
Water skiing	0	1	0	1
Powered paragliding	0	0	1	1
Total	6	6	4	16

=== Medalists ===
Medal	Name	Sport	Event
Gold	Gandi; Asep Hidayat; Jaslin; Marjuki; John Feter Matulessy; Jefklin Mehue; Spens Stuber Mehue; Erwin David Monim; Muchlis; Andri Agus Mulyana; Silo; Rusmin Sina; Sutrisno; Dedi Kurniawan Suyatno; Anwar Tarra; Wardi	Dragon boat	Men's 200 m
Gold	Gandi; Asep Hidayat; Jaslin; Marjuki; John Feter Matulessy; Jefklin Mehue; Spens Stuber Mehue; Erwin David Monim; Muchlis; Andri Agus Mulyana; Silo; Rusmin Sina; Sutrisno; Dedi Kurniawan Suyatno; Anwar Tarra; Wardi	Dragon boat	Men's 500 m
Gold	Gandi; Asep Hidayat; Jaslin; Marjuki; John Feter Matulessy; Jefklin Mehue; Spens Stuber Mehue; Erwin David Monim; Muchlis; Andri Agus Mulyana; Silo; Rusmin Sina; Sutrisno; Dedi Kurniawan Suyatno; Anwar Tarra; Wardi	Dragon boat	Men's 3000 m
Gold	Yaulana Amalia; Dayumin; Nikmah Diana; Yulanda Ester Entong; Seni Gantiani; Yunita Kadop; Siti Maryam; Maryati; Masripah; Sesni Lavenia Monim; Nurhalimah; Ririn Nur Paridah; Kanti Santyawati; Vioditha Cristy Sokoy; Since Litashova Yom; Riana Yulistrian	Dragon boat	Women's 3000 m
Gold	Ade Candra Rachmawan; Koko Prasetyo Darkuncoro	Beach volleyball	Men's event
Gold	Galar Pandu Asmoro; Tonny Mamiri; Rindi Sufriyanto	Sport climbing	Men's speed relay
Silver	Saiyed Nur Adi; Alfin Alim; Sugeng Arifin; Suko Hartono; Haris Munandar; Rizky Abdul Rahman Pago; Hendra Pago; Andi Paturay; Abdul Halim Radjiu; Wisnu Dwi Suhantoro; Husni Uba; Yovi Hendra Utama	Beach sepak takraw	Men's team regu
Silver	Yaulana Amalia; Dayumin; Nikmah Diana; Yulanda Ester Entong; Seni Gantiani; Yunita Kadop; Siti Maryam; Maryati; Masripah; Sesni Lavenia Monim; Nurhalimah; Ririn Nur Paridah; Kanti Santyawati; Vioditha Cristy Sokoy; Since Litashova Yom; Riana Yulistrian	Dragon boat	Women's 200 m
Silver	Yaulana Amalia; Dayumin; Nikmah Diana; Yulanda Ester Entong; Seni Gantiani; Yunita Kadop; Siti Maryam; Maryati; Masripah; Sesni Lavenia Monim; Nurhalimah; Ririn Nur Paridah; Kanti Santyawati; Vioditha Cristy Sokoy; Since Litashova Yom; Riana Yulistrian	Dragon boat	Women's 500 m
Silver	Rindi Sufriyanto	Sport climbing	Men's speed
Silver	Evi Neliwati; Ita Triana Purnamasari; Tita Supita	Sport climbing	Women's speed relay
Silver	Maliki Zulkarnain	Waterskiing	Men's tricks
Bronze	Alfin Alim; Suko Hartono; Hendra Pago; Andi Paturay; Abdul Halim Radjiu; Husni Uba	Beach sepak takraw	Men's regu
Bronze	Seri Ayu Astuti; Gallih Desiari; Roslin Dida; Nur Hidayah; Jumasiah; Akyko Micheel Kapito; Nina Karmila; Ayu Lestari; Aliya Prihatini; Irma Wati; Nur Qadriyanti; Indra Yuliasti	Beach sepak takraw	Women's team regu
Bronze	Priya Jatmiko Agung; Mukhammad Akbar; Hening Paradigma; Bambang Santoso; Thomas Widyananto	Powered paragliding	Team combined
Bronze	Evi Neliwati	Sport climbing	Women's speed
