= Malaysia at the 2012 Asian Beach Games =

- IOC code: MAS
- NOC: Olympic Council of Malaysia
- Website: www.olympic.org.my (in English)

in Haiyang
- Competitors: 24
- Medals Ranked 0th: Gold 0 Silver 0 Bronze 0 Total 0

Asian Beach Games appearances
- 2008; 2010; 2012; 2014; 2016

Malaysia competed in the 2012 Asian Beach Games held in Haiyang, China from 16 to 22 June 2012. Malaysia failed to win a single medal in the games.
