= Hong Kong at the 2012 Asian Beach Games =

- IOC code: HKG
- NOC: Sports Federation and Olympic Committee of Hong Kong, China

in Haiyang
- Medals Ranked 19th: Gold 0 Silver 0 Bronze 0 Total 0

Asian Beach Games appearances
- 2008; 2010; 2012; 2014; 2016; 2026

Hong Kong competed at the 2012 Asian Beach Games held in Haiyang, China from 16 to 22 June 2012. The Hong Kong delegation, consisting of about 80 athletes, competed in eight sports, and finished without medals.

== Beach volleyball ==
The men's duo of Wong Chun Wai and Wong Kwun Pong finished 2nd in Group A and was eliminated in the group stage. The other men's duo, Kwok Wing Ho and Wong Pui Lam, suffered the same fate after finishing 2nd in Group K.

Both women's teams, Chan Mei Kit and Tse Wing Hung in Group S, and Wong Yuen Mei and Ng Tin Lai in Group V, finished 2nd in their respective groups and placed 9th-16th overall.

== Beach woodball ==
Men's team finished 4th.

- Wong Siu Kai, Men's singles (16th)
- Jeremy Ngai, Men's singles (25th)
- Lam Chi Ho, Men's singles (30th)
- Lee Hon Kwong, Men's singles (33rd)
- Li Chi Tak, Men's singles (34th)
- Chow Wai Kin, Men's singles (41st)
- Ng Cho Kwan, Women's singles (23rd)

== Dragon boat ==
- Men's 200m (7th)
- Men's 500m (8th)
- Women's 200m (6th)
- Women's 500m (6th)

== Roller speed skating ==
- Anthony Chung, Men's 200m (11th)
- Anthony Chung, Men's 500m (5-8th)
- Tse On Ho, Men's 10000m points (13th)
- Tse On Ho, Men's 20000m elimination (eliminated)
- Vanessa Wong, Women's 200m (9th)
- Karinne Tam, Women's 200m (10th)
- Vanessa Wong, Women's 500m (5-8th)
- Karinne Tam, Women's 500m (9-12th)
- Karinne Tam, Women's 10000m points (11th)
- Karinne Tam, Women's 20000m elimination (eliminated)

== Sailing ==
- Ma Kwan Ching, Women's Techno 293 (4th)

== Sport climbing ==
- Ho Sin Fai, Men's boulder (4th)
- Tang Siu Hei, Men's boulder (7th)
- Yau Ka Chun, Men's boulder (8th)
- Yau Ka Chun, Men's lead (11th)
- Yau Ka Chun, Men's speed climbing (5-8th)
- Wu Wing Yu, Women's boulder (16th)
- Liu Hiu Ying, Women's boulder (18th)
- Liu Hiu Ying, Women's lead (9th)
- Wu Wing Yu, Women's lead (15th)
- Wu Wing Yu, Women's speed climbing (DNS)

== Water skiing ==
- Julien Breistroff, Men's wakeboard (5th)
- Wan Ka Choi, Men's wakeboard (7-12th)
