= China at the 2012 Asian Beach Games =

- IOC code: CHN
- NOC: Chinese Olympic Committee external link (in Chinese and English)

in Haiyang
- Competitors: 160 in 13 sports
- Medals Ranked 1st: Gold 14 Silver 10 Bronze 12 Total 36

Asian Beach Games appearances
- 2008; 2010; 2012; 2014; 2016

China participated in the 2012 Asian Beach Games in Haiyang, China on 16–22 June 2012.

China also won 14 gold medals, 10 silver medals, 12 bronze medals and a total of 39 medals, finishing first on the medal table.

== 3-on-3 basketball ==
Team	Pld	W	L	PF	PA	PD	Pts
China	3	3	0	46	17	+29	6
Mongolia	3	2	1	29	29	0	5
Turkmenistan	3	1	2	25	39	−14	4
Maldives	3	0	3	20	35	−15	3

17 June
9:30

Mongolia	7–15	China
Pts: Ganzul 3		Pts: Zhang X. 9

Zone C of Fengxiang Beach, Haiyang
Referees: Lim Sok Hoon (MAS)

17 June
16:00

China	13–4	Maldives
Pts: Dilana D. 6		Pts: Rasheed 4

Zone C of Fengxiang Beach, Haiyang
Referees: Kim Bo-hui (KOR)

18 June
9:30

Turkmenistan	6–18	China
Pts: Gokova 4		Pts: Wang S.Y. 9

Zone C of Fengxiang Beach, Haiyang
Referees: Lim Sok Hoon (MAS)

Semifinals

18 June
14:30

China	10–9	Philippines
Pts: Wang S.Y. 4		Pts: Lim 4

Zone C of Fengxiang Beach, Haiyang
Referees: Kim Bo-hui (KOR)

Gold medal match

19 June
16:00

India	17–14	China
Pts: Jose 11		Pts: Zhang X. 9

Zone C of Fengxiang Beach, Haiyang
Referees: Lei Si Man (MAC)

== Beach Soccer ==
Group play

Team	Pld	W	W+	L	GF	GA	GD	Pts
Palestine	3	3	0	0	18	6	+12	9
China	3	1	1	1	11	10	+1	5
Vietnam	3	1	0	2	7	10	−3	3
Afghanistan	3	0	0	3	7	17	−10	0

16 June
11:30

China	6–4	Afghanistan
Han Xuegeng 4', 18' (pen.); Tuluxun Maimaiti 11'; Liyihanmu Aihaiti 12' (pen.), 15'; Cai Weiming 22'	Report	Mohammadi 2'; Safa 4', 28', 34'

Zone D of Fengxiang Beach, Court 1, Haiyang
Referee: Ebrahim Al-Mansoori (United Arab Emirates)
17 June
20:30

China	4–5	Palestine
Han Xuegeng 20', 21'; Wan Chao 24'; Liyihanmu Aihaiti 32'	Report	Attieh 1', 7', 21'; Barakat 19'; Salim 27'

Zone D of Fengxiang Beach, Court 1, Haiyang
Referee: Suwat Wongsuwan (Thailand)
18 June
20:30

China	1–1 (a.e.t.)	Vietnam
Wan Chao 29'	Report	Lê Ngọc Phước 30'
Penalties
Wan Chao (penalty scored); Liyihanmu Aihaiti (penalty scored); Liu Yisi (penalty scored)	3–2	(penalty scored) Lê Kim Tuấn; (penalty scored) Phùng Ngọc Vĩnh Quý; (penalty missed) Nguyễn Văn Luận

Zone D of Fengxiang Beach, Court 1, Haiyang
Referee: Suhaimi Mat Hassan (Malaysia)

Quarterfinals

19 June
20:15

Syria	1–4	China
Nassif 9'	Report	Cai Weiming 1'; Liyihanmu Aihaiti 9'; Han Xuegeng 22', 36'

Zone D of Fengxiang Beach, Court 1, Haiyang
Referee: Suhaimi Mat Hassan (Malaysia)

semifinals

20 June
20:00

China	5–1	Lebanon
Han Xuegeng 8'; Cai Weiming 9'; Wan Chao 22', 26'; Liu Yisi 26'	Report	Fattal 27'

Zone D of Fengxiang Beach, Court 1, Haiyang
Referee: Ebrahim Al-Mansoori (United Arab Emirates)

Gold medal match

21 June
20:00

China	0–2	Iran
	Report	Abdollahi 21'; Ahmadzadeh 34'

Zone D of Fengxiang Beach, Court 1, Haiyang
Referee: Tasuku Onodera (Japan)

== Power paragliding ==
Athlete	Event	Score	
Athlete	Event	Result	Rank
Sheng Guangqiang	Individual economy	85	1st place, gold medalist(s)
Sheng Guangqiang	Individual precision	154	3rd place, bronze medalist(s)
Sheng Guangqiang	Individual combined	239	3rd place, bronze medalist(s)
Cai He; Liu Chang; Sheng Guangqiang; Wang Mingji; Zhao Changhong	Team combined	641	2nd place, silver medalist(s)
